= Cecylówka massacre =

Part of the invasion of Poland

Cecylowka massacre
- Part of the Invasion of Poland (1939)
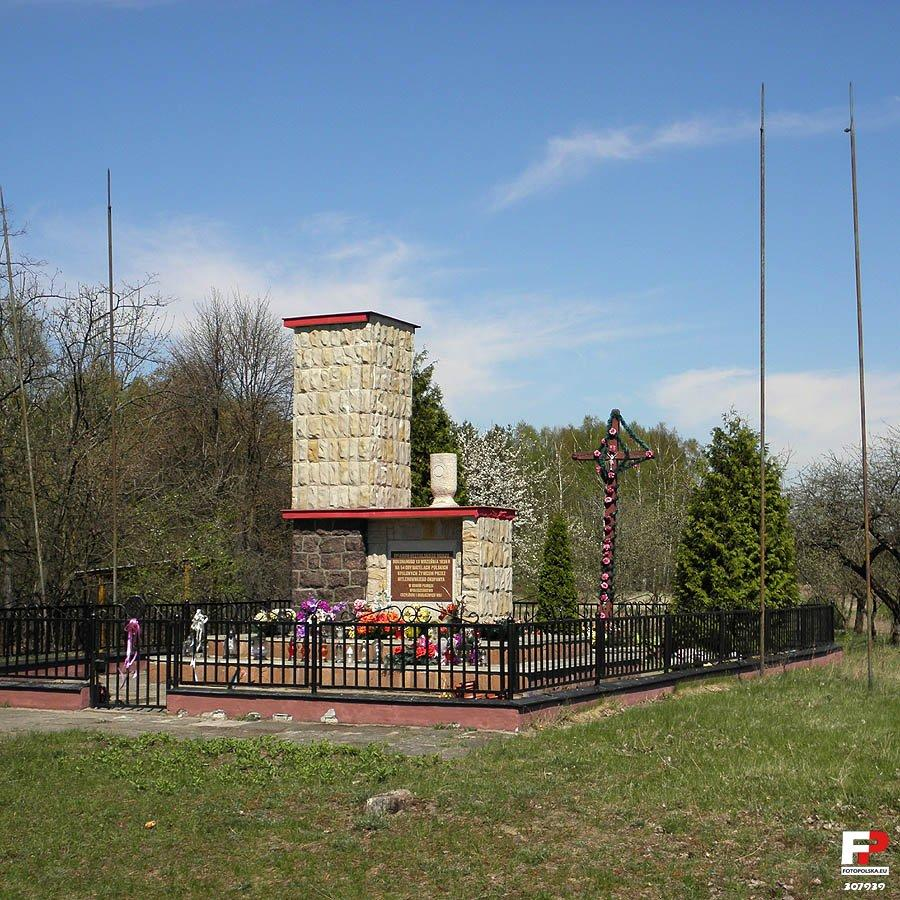
- Massacre memorial in Cecylówka

- Cecylówka massacre (Poland)
- Location: 51°39′18″N 21°14′18″E; Cecylowka, Poland
- Date: September 13, 1939
- Attack type: Mass murder
- Deaths: 54–68
- Perpetrator: Wehrmacht

The Cecylówka massacre, which occurred on 13 September 1939, (Note: Some sources erroneously date the pacification of Cecylówka Głowaczowska to 12 or 15 September 1939. See: Madajczyk (1965), p. 50 and Register (1980), p. 28.) in the village of Cecylówka was a war crime committed by the Wehrmacht during its invasion of Poland.

In September 1939, the area around Cecylówka became the site of intense fighting between Polish and German forces. On the morning of 13 September, an unidentified Wehrmacht unit entered the village. For unknown reasons, the soldiers rounded up all the men in Cecylówka, locked them inside a barn, then threw grenades inside and set it on fire.

Only four men survived the massacre. The estimated number of those murdered ranges from 54 to 68. Among the victims were at least a dozen Jewish men.

== Prelude ==
On the eve of World War II, Cecylówka was a relatively large linear settlement, inhabited by both Poles and Jews.

During the September Campaign of 1939, the area around Cecylówka Głowaczowska became the site of intense fighting between units of the Polish Army and the Wehrmacht. Many residents fled the village in fear of the approaching front, but most men stayed behind to protect their homes and belongings.

On 12 September, Wehrmacht soldiers burned down the neighboring village of Helenówek, killing seven residents. Additionally, in the village of Matyldzin, they murdered two men from Lipskie Budy.

== The Course of Events ==
On 13 September, at around 9:00 a.m., German forces entered Cecylówka. Moving methodically through the village, house by house, they forced the men out onto the road and searched them. Anyone found carrying even a penknife or a straight razor was executed on the spot.

At one point, a machine gun was set up in front of the gathered Poles and Jews, apparently in preparation for an execution. However, a German officer called it off. Instead, the detainees were lined up in columns of four and marched to the other end of the village. Beforehand, through an interpreter, they were ordered to hand over their identity documents, which were immediately burned. Upon reaching the designated location, all the men were forced into a barn belonging to the Gzowski family, where they were locked up for several hours.

Around noon, the Germans opened the barn gates and began throwing hand grenades inside. The building was set ablaze. Any victims who tried to escape were gunned down by soldiers. Ultimately, only four men survived the massacre—three Poles and one Jewish man of unknown name—who, using the smoke as cover, managed to escape from the burning barn and hide in nearby buildings.

The victims were buried in a mass grave dug at the site of the massacre. The burial was carried out by residents of neighboring villages, who were brought in by the Germans.

According to the most conservative estimates, 54 people were murdered in Cecylówka on 13 September 1939. Some Polish sources indicate that the number of victims was around 60, 65, or 68. (Note: The Register of Places and Facts of Crimes Committed by the Nazi Occupier on Polish Lands between 1939 and 1945 states that approximately 50 victims were shot, while the remaining eighteen were burned alive in a barn. See: Register (1980), p. 28.) Among them were at least a dozen Jews.

The exact cause of the massacre remains unknown. Polish journalist Agnieszka Rybak suggested that a possible pretext for the atrocity could have been the fact that some Polish soldiers, after their units were defeated, changed into civilian clothes and abandoned their uniforms in the village. The pacification of Cecylówka may also have been an act of revenge for the fact that Polish forces had resisted the previous day, using village buildings as cover.

It was also not possible to determine the exact Wehrmacht unit responsible for the massacre. It has been only established that at the time, the 3rd Battalion of the 72nd Infantry Regiment of the 46th Infantry Division and the 65th Armored Battalion of the 1st Light Division were operating in the vicinity of Cecylówka.

== Epilogue ==
After the war, the commemoration of the victims of the massacre was initially limited to marking the mass grave and erecting a wooden cross on the site.

In 1969, at the initiative of a local social activist, a monument in the shape of a crematorium chimney was erected on the grave. The commemorative plaque, which is part of the monument, bears the following inscription:

To the victims of the brutal murder committed on September 13, 1939, against 54 Polish citizens, burned alive by the Nazi occupier.
The community of Cecylówka and the surrounding villages.

Because the monument was unveiled shortly after the antisemitic campaign of March 1968, the inscription does not mention that the Jews were among the victims of the massacre.

After the war, the pacification of Cecylówka was investigated by the Central Office of the State Justice Administrations for the Investigation of National Socialist Crimes in Ludwigsburg. However, German investigators failed to identify the perpetrators or bring charges against them.

== Bibliography ==
- Datner, Szymon (1967). 55 dni Wehrmachtu w Polsce. Zbrodnie dokonane na polskiej ludności cywilnej w okresie 1.IX – 25.X. 1939 r. [55 days of the Wehrmacht in Poland. Crimes committed against the Polish civilian population in the period September 1 – October 25, 1939] (in Polish). Warszawa: Wydawnictwo MON.
- Fajkowski, Józef; Religa, Jan (1981). Zbrodnie hitlerowskie na wsi polskiej 1939–1945 [Nazi crimes in the Polish countryside 1939–1945] (in Polish). Warszawa: Książka i Wiedza.
- Madajczyk, Czesław (1965). Hitlerowski terror na wsi polskiej 1939–1945. Zestawienie większych akcji represyjnych [Nazi terror in the Polish countryside 1939–1945. List of major repressive actions] (in Polish). Warszawa: Państwowe Wydawnictwo Naukowe.
- Rejestr miejsc i faktów zbrodni popełnionych przez okupanta hitlerowskiego na ziemiach polskich w latach 1939–1945. Województwo radomskie [Register of places and facts of crimes committed by the Nazi Occupier on Polish Lands in the years 1939–1945. Radom Voivodeship] (in Polish). Warszawa: Ministerstwo Sprawiedliwości. Główna Komisja Badania Zbrodni Hitlerowskich w Polsce. 1980.
