= Leszek Mizieliński =

Polish politician (1954–2017)

Voivode of the Masovian Voivodeship
- In office 21 October 2001 – 10 January 2006
- Preceded by: Antoni Pietkiewicz
- Succeeded by: Tomasz Koziński

Deputy marshal of the Masovian Voivodeship Sejmik
- In office 1998–2001

Deputy mayor of Warsaw
- In office 1994–1999

Personal details
- Born: 10 May 1954 Kolonia Sielce, Poland
- Died: 16 January 2017 (aged 62) Warsaw, Poland
- Party: Democratic Left Alliance; Social Democracy of the Republic of Poland
- Education: University of Warsaw
- Occupation: Politician

Leszek Mizieliński (Polish: [ˈlɛ.ʂɛk mi.ʑɛˈliɲ.ski]; 10 May 1954 – 16 January 2017) was a politician and government official. From 2001 to 2006, he was the voivode of the Masovian Voivodeship.

== Biography ==
Leszek Mizieliński was born on 10 May 1954 in Kolonia Sielce, a village now located within Białobrzegi County, Masovian Voivodeship, Poland. His parents were Tadeusz Mizieliński and Wanda Mizielińska. He had graduated from the Faculty of Political Science and International Studies of the University of Warsaw.

From 1985 to 1988 Mizieliński was a department director in the Ministry of Material and Fuel Economy. Later, he worked in the Industrial Development Agency. In 1990, he was one of the founders of the Social Democracy of the Republic of Poland, and in 1991, the Democratic Left Alliance. From 1994 to 1999 he was a deputy mayor of Warsaw, and from 1998 to 2001 was a deputy marshal of the Masovian Voivodeship Sejmik. From 21 October 2001 to 10 January 2006, Mizieliński was the voivode of the Masovian Voivodeship. Later he returned to working for the Industrial Development Agency, and in 2007 became a plenipotentiary of the mayor of the municipality of Jaktorów. He unsuccessfully candidated for the office of the member of Sejm during the 2005 and 2007 parliamentary elections. He was also a board member of the Polish Red Cross.

Mizieliński struggled with severe health issues, suffering a heart attack and superficial thrombophlebitis, and had an amputation of his right foot. He died on 16 January 2017 in Warsaw, and was buried at the parish cemetery of the Church of the Most Sacred Heart of Our Lord in Warsaw.

== Awards and orders ==
- Officer's Cross of the Order of Polonia Restituta (2005)
