= Bobrek =

Bobrek may refer to:

- Bobrek, Bytom
- Bobrek, Cieszyn
- Bobrek, Lesser Poland Voivodeship
  - Bobrek concentration camp, located there
- Bobrek, Masovian Voivodeship
- Bobrek, Subcarpathian Voivodeship
