= Gradus (disambiguation) =

Gradus is the shortened form of a Latin phrase which means "Steps to Parnassus".

Gradus may also refer to:

- step (Latin: gradus), an ancient Roman unit of length
- gradus deiectio, Latin for "Reduction in rank"
- Gradus Gravis affair, Latin for "Serious Degree"

== People with the surname ==
- Kamila Gradus (born 1967), retired Polish marathon runner
- Jakob Gradus, a character in Vladimir Nabokov's novel Pale Fire.
