= Voivodes of Poland (since 1999) =

Government administrators

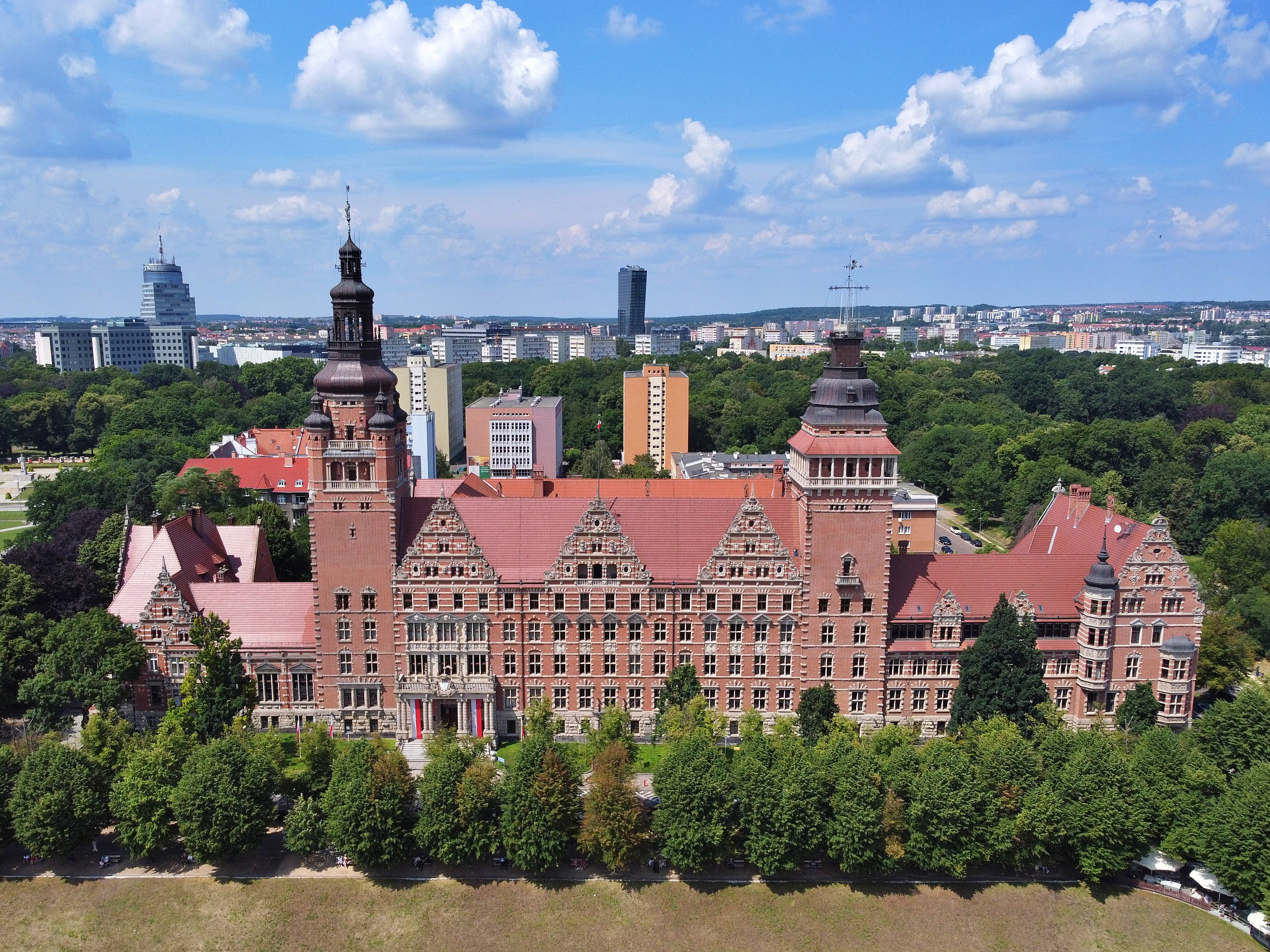
The voivode's office of West Pomeranian Voivodeship in Szczecin.

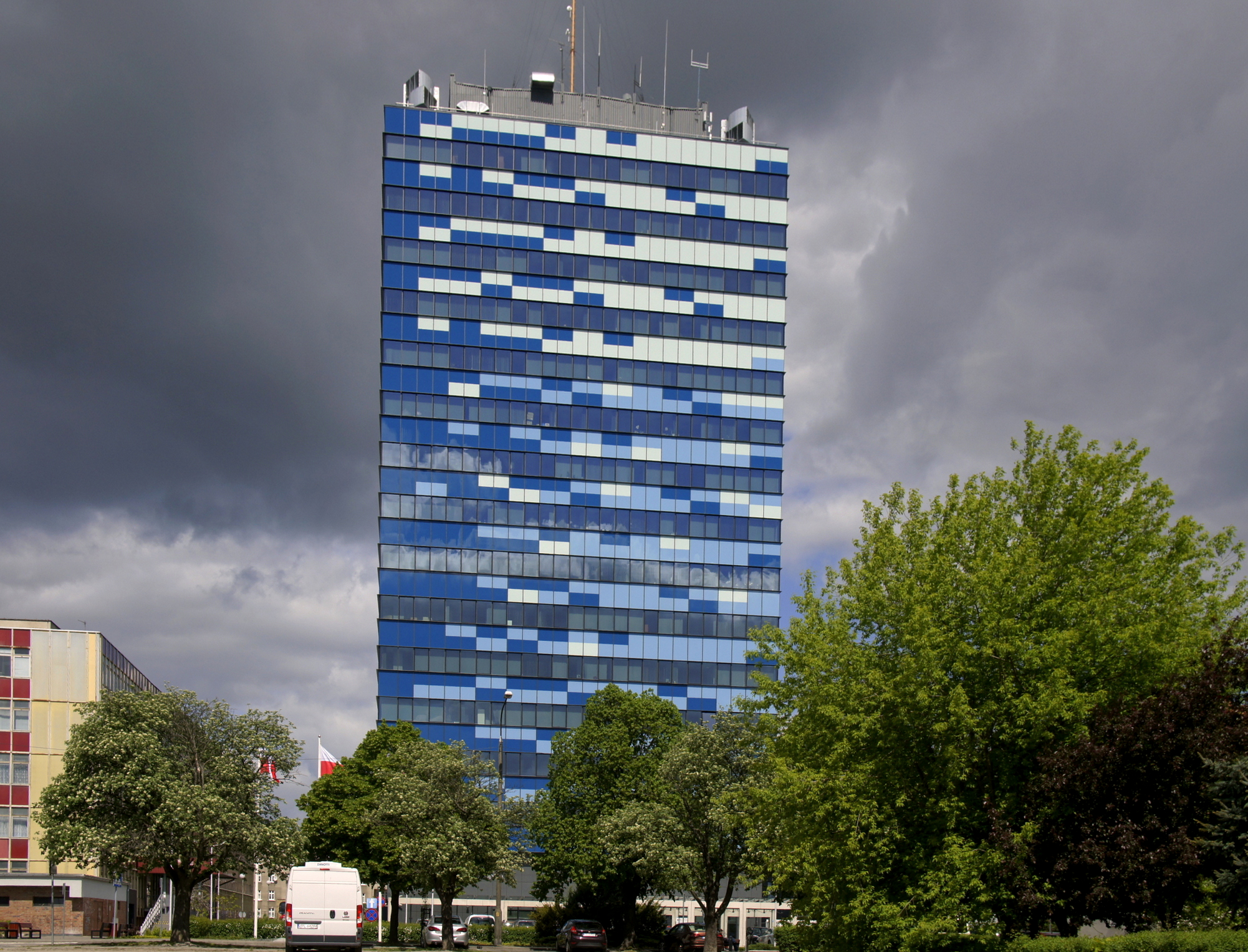
The voivode's office of Lubusz Voivodeship in Gorzów Wielkopolski.

In modern-day Poland, a voivode (Polish: wojewoda) is a representative of the central government, the Council of Ministers, responsible for government administration within one of the 16 voivodeships, first-level administrative divisions of the country.

== Current voivodes ==
Voivodeship	Seat	Voivode	Term start	Appointer	Party
(Lower Silesian Voivodeship) Lower Silesian	Wrocław	Anna Żabska	2024	Donald Tusk	Unaligned
(Kuyavian–Pomeranian Voivodeship) Kuyavian–Pomeranian	Bydgoszcz	Michał Sztybel	2023	Donald Tusk	PO
(Lublin Voivodeship) Lublin	Lublin	Krzysztof Komorski	2023	Donald Tusk	PO
(Lubusz Voivodeship) Lubusz	Gorzów Wielkopolski	Marek Cebula	2023	Donald Tusk	PO
(Łódź Voivodeship) Łódź	Łódź	Dorota Ryl	2023	Donald Tusk	PO
(Lesser Poland Voivodeship) Lesser Poland	Kraków	Krzysztof Klęczar	2023	Donald Tusk	PSL
(Masovian Voivodeship) Masovian	Warsaw	Mariusz Frankowski	2023	Donald Tusk	PO
(Opolskie Voivodeship) Opole	Opole	Monika Jurek	2023	Donald Tusk	PO
(Subcarpathian Voivodeship) Subcarpathian	Rzeszów	Teresa Kubas-Hul	2023	Donald Tusk	PO
(Podlaskie Voivodeship) Podlaskie	Białystok	Jacek Brzozowski	2023	Donald Tusk	PO
(Pomeranian Voivodeship) Pomeranian	Gdańsk	Beata Rutkiewicz	2023	Donald Tusk	Unaligned
(Silesian Voivodeship) Silesian	Katowice	Marek Wójcik	2023	Donald Tusk	PO
(Świętokrzyskie Voivodeship) Świętokrzyskie	Kielce	Józef Bryk	2023	Donald Tusk	PO
(Warmian–Masurian Voivodeship) Warmian–Masurian	Olsztyn	Radosław Król	2023	Donald Tusk	PSL
(Greater Poland Voivodeship) Greater Poland	Poznań	Agata Sobczyk	2024	Donald Tusk	PL2050
(West Pomeranian Voivodeship) West Pomeranian	Szczecin	Adam Rudawski	2023	Donald Tusk	PL2050

== Past officeholders by voivodeship ==
=== Masovian Voivodeship ===
Term start	Term end	Voivode	Party	Other high offices held
1 January 1999	20 October 2001	Antoni Pietkiewicz	AWS	Voivode of Kalisz (1990–1991)
21 October 2001	10 January 2006	Leszek Mizieliński	SLD	Masovian vice-marshal (1998–2001)
10 January 2006	17 January 2007	Tomasz Koziński	PiS	Mayor of Praga-Południe (2002–2006)
18 January 2007	1 February 2007	Wojciech Dąbrowski	PiS	Mayor of Żoliborz (2004–2006)
15 February 2007	29 November 2007	Jacek Sasin	PiS	Deputy PM (since 2019), MP (since 2011)
29 November 2007	8 December 2015	Jacek Kozłowski	PO	Vice-Chairman of Poland 2050
8 December 2015	11 November 2019	Zdzisław Sipiera	PiS	Mayor of Wola (2005–2006), MP (2019–2023)
25 November 2019	31 March 2023	Konstanty Radziwiłł	PiS	Minister of Health (2015–2018), MP (2015–2019)
31 March 2023	13 December 2023	Tobiasz Bocheński	PiS	Łódź Voivode (2019–2023)
13 December 2023	Incumbent	Mariusz Frankowski	PO	Deputy director of strategy and regional development of the Masovian Vovoideship in the Marshal's Office (2007–2011) Warsaw city councilor (2018–2023),

=== Lower Silesian Voivodeship ===
Portrait	Name	Party	Term of Office		Prime minister (Cabinet)
	Witold Krochmal	Solidarity Electoral Action	1 January 1999	19 October 2001	Jerzy Buzek (Buzek)
	Ryszard Nawrat	Democratic Left Alliance	19 October 2001	21 March 2003	Leszek Miller (Miller)
	Stanisław łopatowski	Democratic Left Alliance	21 March 2003	21 December 2005	Leszek Miller (Miller) Marek Belka (Belka I, Belka II)
	Krzysztof Grzelczyk	Law and Justice	21 December 2005	29 November 2007	Kazimierz Marcinkiewicz (Marcinkiewicz) Jarosław Kaczyński (Kaczyński)
	Rafał Jurkowlaniec	Nonpartisan (	29 November 2007	1 December 2010	Donald Tusk (Tusk I)
	Aleksander Skorupka	Civic Platform	1 December 2010	11 March 2014	Donald Tusk (Tusk I, Tusk II)
	Tomasz Smolarz	Civic Platform	11 March 2014	8 December 2015	Donald Tusk Tusk II) Ewa Kopacz ( Kopacz)
	Paweł Hreniak	Law and Justice	8 December 2015	11 November 2019	Beata Szydło (Szydło) Mateusz Morawiecki (Morawiecki I)
	Jarosław Obremski	Law and Justice	29 November 2019	22 December 2023	Mateusz Morawiecki ( Morawiecki II, Morawiecki III)
	Maciej Awiżeń	Civic Platform	22 December 2023	25 November 2024	Donald Tusk (Tusk III)
	Anna Żabska	Nonpartisan	25 November 2024	Present	Donald Tusk (Tusk III)

== See also ==
- Voivodeship marshal
- Voivodeship executive board
