= Antoni Pietkiewicz =

Deputy marshal of the Masovian Voivodeship Sejmik
- In office 26 November 2002 – 20 October 2003 Serving with Wojciech Wierzejski
- Preceded by: Marek Lejk; Jerzy Dobek
- Succeeded by: Bogusław Kowalski

Voivode of Masovian Voivodeship
- In office 4 January 1999 – 22 October 2001
- Preceded by: Office established
- Succeeded by: Leszek Mizieliński

Deputy chairperson of the Supreme Audit Office
- In office 1992–1995 Serving with Marek Górski and Piotr Kownacki
- Preceded by: Bogdan Łysak
- Succeeded by: Jacek Uczkiewicz

Deputy director of the Chancellery of the President of the Republic of Poland
- In office 17 January 1991 – 12 October 1991 Serving with Jerzy Breitkopf and Sławomir Siwek
- Preceded by: Kazimierz Małecki
- Succeeded by: Lech Falandysz

Voivode of Kalisz Voivodeship
- In office August 1990 – December 1991
- Preceded by: Marian Jóźwiak
- Succeeded by: Mariusz Kubiak

Personal details
- Born: 24 December 1948 (age 77) Kalisz, Poland
- Party: Solidarity Electoral Action
- Spouse: Małgorzata Jedynak-Pietkiewicz (died 2013)
- Education: Łódź University of Technology; SGH Warsaw School of Economics; Warsaw University of Technology
- Occupation: Engineer; Politician; Businessperson

Antoni Kazimierz Pietkiewicz (Polish: [anˈtɔ.ɲi kaˈʑi.mjɛʂ pjɛtˈkjɛ.vit͡ʂ]; born 24 December 1948) is a Polish engineer, businessperson, and politician. He was the voivode of Kalisz Voivodeship in Poland from 1990 to 1991, and the voivode of Masovian Voivodeship from 1999 to 2001. He also was a deputy director of the Chancellery of the President of the Republic of Poland from 1991 to 1992, a deputy chairperson of the Supreme Audit Office from 1992 to 1995, and a deputy marshal of the Masovian Voivodeship Sejmik from 2002 to 2003.

== Biography ==
Antoni Pietkiewicz was born on 24 December 1948 in the city of Kalisz, located in Greater Poland Voivodeship, Poland. He was a son of Feliks and Janina Pietkiewicz, and had a younger brother Jerzy Pietkiewicz. In 1978, he graduated from the Faculty of the Power Engineering of the Łódź University of Technology, and later received the post-graduate degrees from the Warsaw University of Technology and the SGH Warsaw School of Economics.

In the 1970s, Pietkiewicz was an activist in the Movement for Defence of Human and Civic Rights and the Workers' Defence Committee. From 1979 to 1980, he co-published newsletter Wolne Słowo (lit. 'The Free Word'), and in 1980, Pietkiewicz became a member of the Solidarity trade union. He led the creation of its division in Kalisz, and was a board member of its South Greater Poland region. Pietkiewicz was a delegate at the first National Congress of Delegates of the Solidarity in Gdańsk. He was arrested together with his brother Jerzy while Poland was under the martial law, and placed in the internment on 13 December 1981, and released on 23 December 1982. Pietkiewicz was again arrested in July 1984, and released following the amnesty from 21 July 1984.

From August 1990 to December 1991, Pietkiewicz was the voivode of Kalisz Voivodeship. From 17 January 1991 to 12 October 1991, he was a deputy director of the Chancellery of the President of the Republic of Poland, and from 1992 to 1995, he was a deputy chairperson of the Supreme Audit Office. Pietkiewicz served as the voivode of the Masovian Voivodeship from 4 January 1999 to 22 October 2001. From 26 November 2002 to 20 October 2003, he was a deputy marshal of the Masovian Voivodeship Sejmik, serving together with Wojciech Wierzejski.

From 2001 to 2003, Pietkiewicz was a board director of the company Bioenergia ESP in Gdynia; from 2003 to 2006 a deputy chairperson of Prestige Development in Warsaw; from 2005 to 2006, the main investment specialist at the Cardinal Stefan Wyszyński University in Warsaw; from 2006 to 2007 a deputy chairperson, and from 2008 to 2011 a chairperson of BOT Górnictwo i Energetyka in Łódź. From 2016, he is a chairperson of Fabryka Kotłów Sefako in Sędziszów.

== Personal life ==
He was married to journalist and political activist Małgorzata Jedynak-Pietkiewicz (1945–2013).

== Awards and decorations ==
- Commandor of the Order of Merit of the Italian Republic (2000)
- Commandor of the Order of Polonia Restituta (2006)
- Cross of Freedom and Solidarity (2016)
- Meritorious Activist of Culture Badge (2001)
- Honorary Citizenship of Kalisz (2009)
