= Jacek Kozłowski =

Polish politician (born 1957)

- Kozłowski in 2013.

Deputy chairperson of Supreme Audit Office of Poland
- Incumbent
- Assumed office 22 December 2023 Serving with Piotr Miklis (since 2023), Katarzyna Budnikowska (since 2023), Michał Jędrzejczyk (2023–2025), and Sylweriusz Królak (2023–2025)
- Preceded by: Tadeusz Dziuba; Małgorzata Motylow

Voivode of Masovian Voivodeship
- In office 29 November 2007 – 8 December 2015
- Preceded by: Jacek Sasin
- Succeeded by: Zdzisław Sipiera

Deputy voivodeship marshal of Masovian Voivodeship
- In office 24 November 2006 – 26 November 2007 Serving with Tomasz Siemoniak
- Preceded by: Janusz Kotowski; Bogusław Kowalski
- Succeeded by: Marcin Kierwiński; Stefan Kotlewski

Personal details
- Born: 18 December 1957 (age 68) Sopot, Poland
- Party: Poland 2050 (2020–2023); Civic Platform (2003–2019); Freedom Union (1994–2003); Liberal Democratic Congress (1991–1994)
- Education: Rutgers School of Communication and Information; University of Gdańsk
- Occupation: Politician, civil servant, academic

Jacek Kozłowski (Polish: [ˈja.t͡sɛk kɔˈzwɔf.ski]; born 18 December 1957) is a Polish politician, civil servant, and academic. From 29 November 2007 to 8 December 2015, he was the voivode of Masovian Voivodeship in Poland. Since 22 December 2023, Kozłowski serves as the deputy chairperson of the Supreme Audit Office of Poland. Previously, he was a party member of the Civic Platform from 2003 to 2019, and the Poland 2050 from 2020 to 2023.

== Biography ==
Jacek Kozłowski was born on 18 December 1957 in the city of Sopot, Poland, then part of Gdańsk Voivodeship, and now belonging to Pomeranian Voivodeship. He graduated from the University of Gdańsk with a degree in geography, and later from the Rutgers School of Communication and Information in New Brunswick, located in New Jersey, United States, with a degree of the Master of Business Administration. In the 1980s, Kozłowski was active in the anti-communist and pro-democratic dissident movements in the People's Republic of Poland.

In the 1990s, Kozłowski worked as an expert advisor for the Culture and Media Committee of the Sejm of Poland, the National Broadcasting Council of Poland, and the Council of Europe. For a few years, he was also a lecturer at several universities, including at the University of Gdańsk, University of Warsaw, Civitas University in Warsaw, the French Institute of Management in Warsaw, and the Higher School of Communication and Social Media in Warsaw.

From 1990 to 1993, with a break in 1992, Kozłowski was the director of the Government Press Bureau, the deputy of the government spokesperson, and the general director of the Council of Ministers Office. From 1994 to 1996, he was the acting general director of the Foundation for the Development of Local Democracy. From 1998 to 2001, Kozłowski was the director of public relations office of Bank Polska Kasa Opieki, and later, for the five years, he was self-employed as advisor for the financial communication and implementation of financial projects.

From 1999 to 1994, Kozłowski was a party member of Liberal Democratic Congress, and from 1994, of the Freedom Union party. He unsuccessfully run for a seat in the Sejm of Poland during the 1991 election, from the constituency no. 22, which was centered on Rzeszów and Tarnobrzeg in Subcarpathian Voivodeship, receiving 2,520 votes (0.51%), and during the 1993 election, from the constituency no. 30, centered on the Upper Silesian Industrial Region in Silesian Voivodeship, receiving 3,201 votes (1%). For several years, Kozłowski left the politics, and in 2003, he joined the Civic Platform. In 2006, he managed the campaign of Hanna Gronkiewicz-Waltz, during the mayoral election in Warsaw. From 24 November 2006 to 26 November 2007, Kozłowski was appointed as the deputy voivodeship marshal of the Masovian Voivodeship. On 29 November 2007, Kozłowski was appointed as the voivode of Masovian Voivodeship. On 12 December 2011, he was reappointed for the second term, which lasted until 8 December 2015.

Kozłowski unsuccessfully run for a seat in the European Parliament during the 2009 and 2014 elections, from the constituency no. 5, consisting of Masovian Voivodeship, with the exception of the Warsaw metropolitan area. He received 36,672 (32.16%) and 19,985 (26.52%), respectively. Kozłowski also unsuccessfully run for a seat in the Sejm of Poland during the 2015 election, from the constituency no. 19, which consists of the city of Warsaw, receiving 3,021 votes (0.28%). In January 2018, Kozłowski was expelled from the Civic Platform, after he accused the party leadership of manipulating the election in Masovian Voivodeship. In 2019, Kozłowski was presented the opportunity to fill a vacant seat in the Sejm, however he refused it. In the 2020 Polish presidential election, Kozłowski expressed his support for Szymon Hołownia. The same year, he became the deputy chairperson of the Poland 2050 party, and in 2022, became its treasurer. On 22 December 2023, Kozłowski was appointed as the deputy chairperson of the Supreme Audit Office of Poland, in connection to which, he resigned from his party.

== Personal life ==
Kozłowski has a wife and a daughter.

== Awards and decorations ==
- Honorary Badge for Meritorious to Masovia (Poland, 2010)
- Knight of the Royal Norwegian Order of Merit, 1st class (Norway, 2012)
- Gold Badge for Meritorious to Customs Service (Poland, 2013)
- Honorary Badge of the President of Warsaw Stefan Starzyński (Poland, 2013)
- Honorary Badge for Meritorious to Local Government (Poland, 2015)

== Electoral results ==
Year	Office		Party	District	Votes			Result	Ref.
Year	Office		Party	District	Total	%	P.	Result	Ref.
1991	Sejm of Poland	1st	Liberal Democratic Congress	No. 22	2,520	0.51	39th	Lost	
1993	Sejm of Poland	2nd	Liberal Democratic Congress	No. 30	3,201	1.00	25th	Lost	
2009	European Parliament	7th	Civic Platform	No. 5	36,672	32.16	4th	Lost	
2014	European Parliament	8th	Civic Platform	No. 5	19,985	26.52	6th	Lost	
2015	Sejm of Poland	8th	Civic Platform	No. 19	3,021	0.28	29th	Lost	
