= Boże =

Boże refers to the following places in Poland:

- Boże, Masovian Voivodeship
- Boże, Warmian-Masurian Voivodeship
