= Tomasz Koziński =

Polish politician (born 1959)

Director of the Central Sports Centre
- In office 2017–2018
- Preceded by: Cezary Andrzej Jurkiewicz
- Succeeded by: Mariusz Kałużny

Member of the Warsaw City Council
- In office 2014–2018
- Constituency: No. 2

Voivode of the Masovian Voivodeship
- In office 10 January 2006 – 17 January 2007
- Preceded by: Leszek Mizieliński
- Succeeded by: Wojciech Dąbrowski

Mayor of Praga-South
- In office 2002–2006

Member of the Masovian Voivodeship Sejmik
- In office 2002 – 10 January 2006
- Constituency: No. 3

Personal details
- Born: 10 February 1955 (age 71) Warsaw, Poland
- Party: Law and Justice (since 2001)
- Other political affiliations: Centre Agreement (1994–2001)
- Education: Józef Piłsudski University of Physical Education; Koźmiński University
- Occupation: Politician, teacher, business executive

Tomasz Marian Koziński (Polish: [ˈtɔ.maʂ ˈma.rjan kɔˈʑiɲ.ski]; born 10 February 1955) is a Polish politician, teacher, and business executive. From 2006 to 2007, he was the voivode of the Masovian Voivodeship. From 2002 to 2006, he was the mayor of Praga-South, a city district of Warsaw, and a member of the Masovian Voivodeship Sejmik. From 2014 to 2018, Koziński was also a member of the Warsaw City Council, and from 2017 to 2018, he was the director of the Central Sports Centre, an institution of the Ministry of Sport and Tourism. He is a member of the Law and Justice party.

== Biography ==
Tomasz Koziński was born on 10 February 1955 in Warsaw, Poland. He graduated from the Józef Piłsudski University of Physical Education in Warsaw, and later from the Koźmiński University in Warsaw. He worked as a physical education teacher and a handball trainer. Koziński also organized sports events and thought at the Institute for the Deaf in Warsaw.

From 1994 to 2001, Koziński was a member of the Centre Agreement party, and in 2001, he was one of the founders of the Law and Justice party. From 1999 to 2001, Koziński was a deputy director of the management of the city district of Praga-South in the municipality of Warsaw-Centre, being responsible among other things for the education department. From 2002 to 2006, he was the mayor of Praga-South, a city district of Warsaw, and a member of the Masovian Voivodeship Sejmik. In the latter, Koziński was the leader of the parliamentary group of the Law and Justice party. He unsuccessfully run for office to the Sejm of Poland in 2001, 2005, and 2007, in the constituency no. 19, consisting of the city of Warsaw. Koziński also unsuccessfully run for office to the European Parliament in the 2004 election.

From 10 January 2006 to 17 January 2007, Koziński was the voivode of the Masovian Voivodeship. In 2007, he was a director the company Elektrownie Szczytowo-Pompowe. From 2014 to 2018, Koziński was a member of the Warsaw City Council. He unsuccessfully ran for reelection in 2018.

From 2008 to 2012, Koziński also operated his company, and until 2017, he worked as an academic teacher. From 2017 to 2018, Koziński was the director of the Central Sports Centre, an institution of the Ministry of Sport and Tourism.

== Personal life ==
Koziński has a wife and a daughter.

== Awards and decorations ==
- Silver Cross of Merit (2016)
- Honorary Badge of Merit to the Local Government (2017)
