= Milvi Koplus =

Estonian physician, numerologist and hiromant

Milvi Koplus (16 June 1935 – 8 January 2010) was an Estonian psychiatrist, numerologist and hiromant.

== Career ==
Milvi Koplus was born 16 June 1935.

Koplus was the author of Cosmic numbers (Estonian: Kosmilised numbrid), a bestselling 1993 book of numerology and among the first books on the subject published in Estonia after the end of the Soviet occupation in 1991.

Koplus was connected to an affair of sale of prescriptions for Subutex, a psychotropic medicine used for replacement treatment of certain drug addictions, and was in 2006 fined twice for violations of prescription issuance rules by Estonian Office of Healthcare. Koplus denied the charges, claiming that contrary to the fining orders, she duly processed each patient whom she prescribed Subutex. According to the Health Board, Milvi Koplus issued about 7000 prescriptions for Subutex within four months of 2003. In connection with the affair, the Estonian Medical Association cancelled the memberships of Rostislav Vassiljev and Koplus in 2007. This was the first case of the association cancelling membership for ethical issues.

== See also ==
- Gradus Gravis affair
