= European Board of Dermatology-Venereology =

Dermatology and venereology specialties in European Union

- Type: IGO
- Region served: European Union, European Economic Area
- President: Dr Daiva Jasaitiene (Lithuania)
- Website: www.uems-ebdv.org

The European Board of Dermatology-Venereology (EBDV) represents the specialties of dermatology and venereology (genito-urinary medicine in the UK) within the European Union of Medical Specialists (UEMS).

== Responsibility ==
The EBDV is responsible for setting the charter of training in dermatology-venereology, the guidelines for the log book of training and visitation of training centres and the European board examination in dermatology-venereology in UEMS member states.

== Examination ==
The UEMS-EBDV board examination covers the specialties of dermatology and venereology and has been held annually since 2006. Trainees are eligible to sit the examination when they have fulfilled the requirements of their national training body or when approaching the end of their training.

Candidates who successfully passed the board examination and are certified specialists in a UEMS member state can call themselves 'Fellow of the European Board of Dermatology-Venereology' (FEBDV), other successful candidates are considered 'European Board Certified'. The European examinations are compulsory in some member states.

== See also ==
- Deutsche Dermatologische Gesellschaft
