= Marcin Zydorowicz =

Polish politician (born 1974)

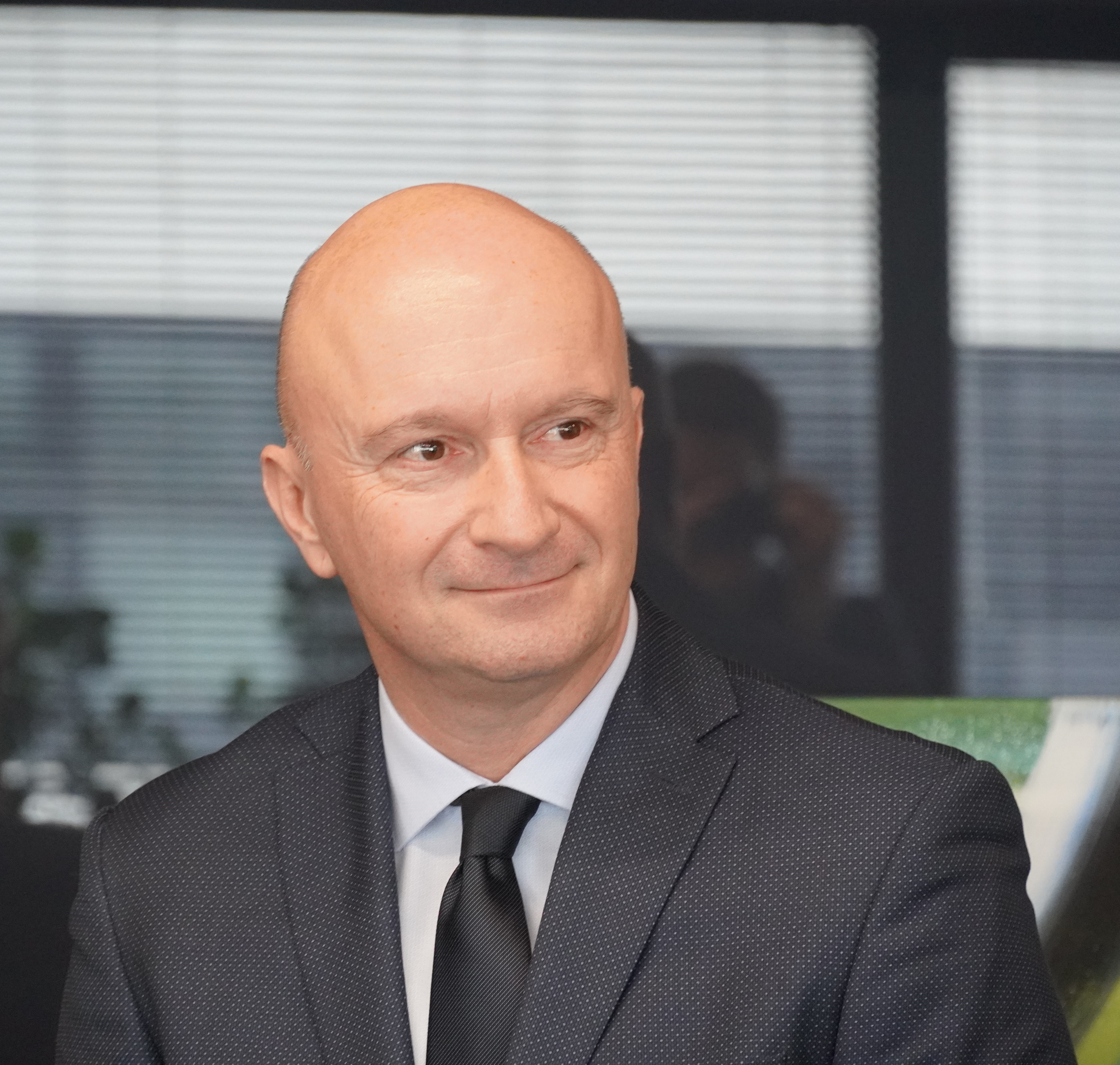
- Zydorowicz in 2024.

Voivode of West Pomeranian Voivodeship
- In office 29 November 2007 – 11 March 2014
- Preceded by: Robert Krupowicz
- Succeeded by: Marek Tałasiewicz

Personal details
- Born: 18 September 1974 (age 51) Katowice, Poland
- Party: Civic Platform
- Education: University of Szczecin
- Occupation: Government official

Marcin Łukasz Zydorowicz (Note: Polish pronunciation: [ˈmar.t͡ɕin ˈwu.kaʂ zɘ̟.dɔˈrɔ.vit͡ʂ]) (born 18 September 1974; Polish: [zɘ̟.dɔˈrɔ.vit͡ʂ]) is a Polish statesman and local government official, who served as the voivode of West Pomeranian Voivodeship in Poland from 2007 to 2014. He is a member of the Civic Platform political party.

== Biography ==
Marcin Zydorowicz was born on 18 September 1974 in Katowice, Poland. He is a son of sports journalist Andrzej Zydorowicz.

He has a degree in sociology from the Faculty of Humanities of the University of Szczecin. In 1998, Zydorowicz begun working with the regional plenipotentiary for the introduction of universal health insurance. From 1999, he worked in the West Pomeranian Regional Health Insurance Fund, and later was employed in the Szczecin division of the National Health Fund. In 2007, he was a deputy director of the Department of Health, and director of the Health and Public Policy Office, in the West Pomeranian Marshal Office.

Zydorowicz joined the Civic Platform political party, and on 29 November 2007, he was appointed the voivode of the West Pomeranian Voivodeship, with his office extended for a second term on 12 December 2011. He served until 11 March 2014.

== Private life ==
He has a wife and a son.

== Awards and decorations ==
- Golden Medal of Merit to the Border Guard (2011)
- Bronze Badge to the Meritorious to Fire Protection (2013)
