= Viral Hepatitis Congress =

The Viral Hepatitis Congress is an academic conference aimed broadly at gastroenterologists, hepatologists, and specifically at viral hepatitis-treating clinicians and clinical researchers.

== History ==
The inaugural Congress was held at the Goethe University Frankfurt from Friday 7 September to Sunday 9 September 2012. In the region of 400 delegates, representing 43 countries, attended for the two and half day programme, featuring keynote lectures, plenary sessions and industry symposia. Scientific abstracts were accepted to the Congress and presented as either poster or oral communications, the abstracts presented at the meeting were published as a supplement to the Journal of Viral Hepatitis. In 2012 and 2013, the Viral Hepatitis Congress was accredited by the European Accreditation Council for Continuing Medical Education (EACCME) and institution of the European Union of Medical Specialists, and designated for up to 13 hours of European external CME credits.

The 2013 Congress took place at the Messe Frankfurt Congress Center from Thursday 26 September to Saturday 28 September 2013. Topics included:

- Hepatitis C Epidemiology, Screening and Diagnosis
- The New Era of HCV Therapies: IFN-containing Regimens
- The New Era of HCV Therapies: IFN-free Regimens
- HCV Comorbidities
- Clinical Challenges in Hepatitis C
- Hepatitis B
- Hepatitis D and E
- Hepatocellular carcinoma

The abstracts presented at the 2013 Congress were again published as a supplement to the Journal of Viral Hepatitis.
