= Konstanty Radziwiłł =

Polish politician and physician

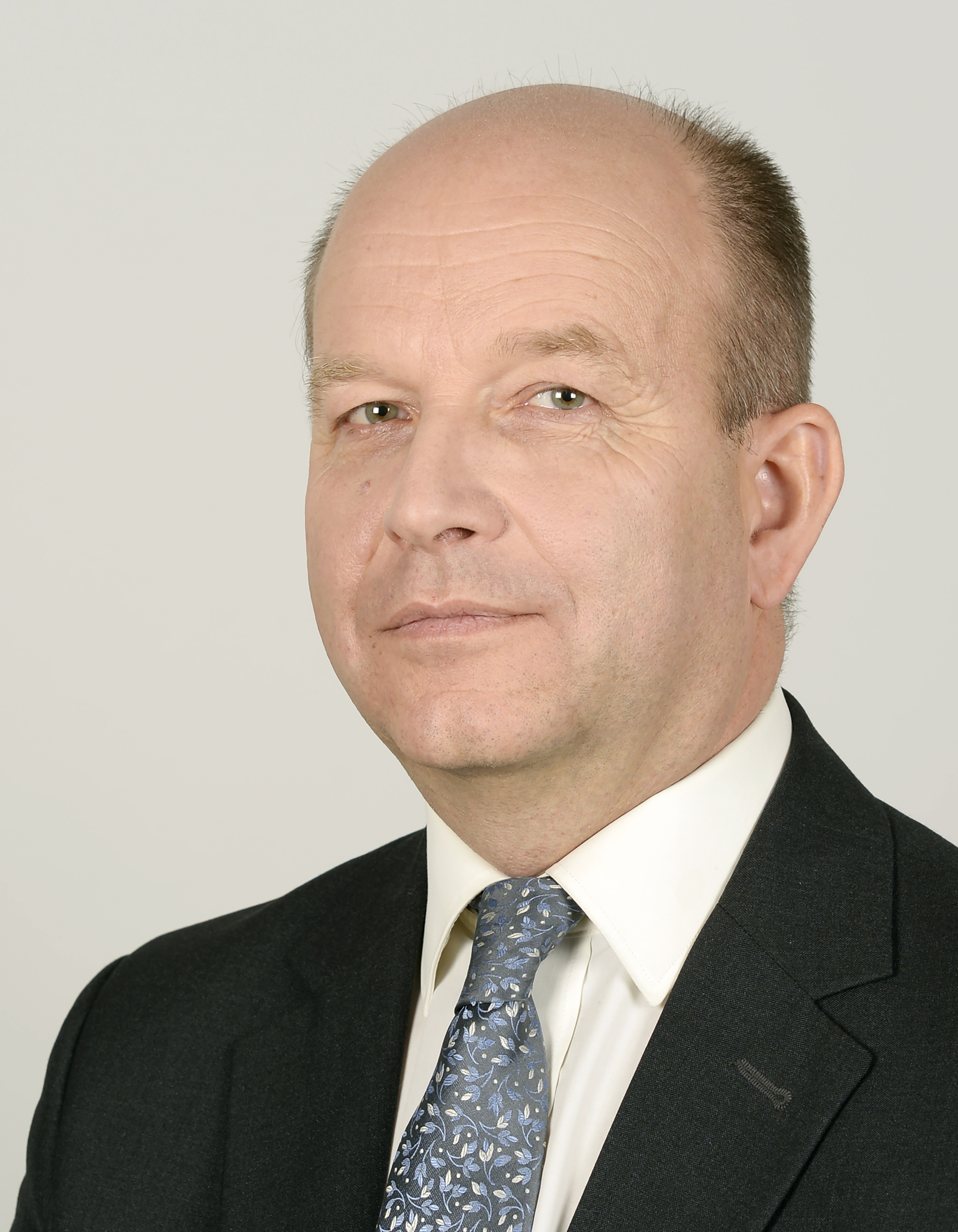

Voivode of the Masovian Voivodeship
- In office 25 November 2019 – 31 March 2023
- Prime Minister: Mateusz Morawiecki
- Preceded by: Zdzisław Sipiera
- Succeeded by: Tobiasz Bocheński

Minister of Health
- In office 16 November 2015 – 9 January 2018
- Prime Minister: Beata Szydło; Mateusz Morawiecki
- Preceded by: Marian Zembala
- Succeeded by: Łukasz Szumowski

President of the Chamber of Physicians and Dentists
- In office 2001–2010
- Preceded by: Krzysztof Madej
- Succeeded by: Maciej Hamankiewicz

Ambassador of Poland to Lithuania
- In office 2023–2024
- Preceded by: Urszula Doroszewska

Personal details
- Born: 9 January 1958 (age 68) Wrocław, Poland
- Education: Medical University of Warsaw

Konstanty Mikołaj Melchior Maria Radziwiłł (Polish pronunciation: [kɔnˈstantɨ raˈd͡ʑiviww]; born 9 January 1958) is a Polish politician, physician, from 2023 to 2024 serving as ambassador to Lithuania. He was Poland's Minister of Health from 16 November 2015 to 9 January 2018. He is a former Voivode of the Masovian Voivodeship (2019–2023), and member of the Polish Senate and a past president of the Chamber of Physicians and Dentists.

He graduated from the Medical University of Warsaw. He is a member of the aristocratic Radziwiłł family.

He has been married since 1979 to architect Joanna Dąbrowska (born in Warsaw in 1959), and the couple have four daughters and four sons.

== Background ==
Born in Wrocław on 9 January 1958, he is the eldest child and only son of the 1979 marriage of Albert Hieronym Radziwiłł (1931–2010) with Anna Czartoryska, born 1932. His parents married at Puszczykowo and his sisters were born in nearby Poznań in 1959 and 1961, but from the age of seven he was raised in Warsaw. His father was a business school graduate. He belongs to the Szydłowiecki branch of the historically princely House of Radziwiłł, which owned an estate at Zegrze from the 19th century.

His paternal grandfather, Constantine, fought as a Polish officer in the Warsaw Uprising and was murdered by the Nazis in 1944, while his maternal grandfather, Prince Roman Czartoryski, had won the Polish Medal of Valour in 1920 and became a prisoner of war during the Invasion of Poland.

Radziwiłł joined the NZS (1980–1982), while still in college.

== Education ==
Radziwiłł specialized in family medicine while pursuing his degree at the Medical Academy in Warsaw, undertaking post-graduate studies in the economics of health care at the University of Warsaw and bioethics.

== Medical career ==
Dr. Radziwiłł worked for several years after graduation as a primary care physician in a health center, then in Warsaw's ambulance service. Beginning in 1997 he entered the private sector as chief physician for industrial enterprises. He headed the Family Medicine Clinic as a non-public health care facility, and remains a practicing physician.

From 1997–2001 Radziwiłł served as secretary of the Supreme Medical Council, and from 2001 as its president. He systematically participates in the work of the Standing Committee of the European Doctors of Medicine (CPME), an advisory body to the European Commission, where he has helped craft legislative solutions on health care issues. He became chairman of the CPME's Ethics Committee. He also became president of the Medical Academy in Warsaw and treasurer of the National Commission.
