= Stromiecka Wola =

- Village
- Location within Poland
- Coordinates: 51°38′24″N 21°3′25″E
- Country: Poland
- Voivodeship: Masovian
- County: Białobrzegi
- Gmina: Stromiec
- Population: 280

Stromiecka Wola [strɔˈmjɛt͡ska ˈvɔla] is a village in the administrative district of Gmina Stromiec, within Białobrzegi County, Masovian Voivodeship, in east-central Poland.
