= Chamber of Physicians and Dentists =

Polish organisational body

The Chamber of Physicians and Dentists (Polish: Naczelna Izba Lekarska) together with the regional chambers of physicians and dentists are the organizational bodies of the professional self-government of physicians and dental practitioners who are associated in the chambers with equal status. Chambers of physicians and dentists deal with all kinds of matters concerning the exercise of medicine and dentistry in Poland.

The organs of The Polish Chamber of Physicians and Dentists are: General Assembly, Supreme Medical Council (implements resolutions of the General Assembly, supervises the correct execution of tasks of the self-government of physicians and dentists, coordinates and supervises activities of regional medical councils), The Supreme Screener for Professional Liability (conducts proceedings in cases involving professional liability of physicians and dentists), The Supreme Medical Court (hears cases involving professional liability of physicians and dentists), The Supreme Audit Committee (controls financial and business activities of the Polish Chamber of Physicians and Dentists).

The regional chamber of physicians and dentists registers as its members those physicians and dentists who hold a right to practice the profession and intend to practice as a physician or dentist within the jurisdiction of the given chamber.

The Medical Code of Ethics was passed at the 2nd General Medical Assembly in 1991. It was significantly amended at the 3rd General Medical Assembly in 1993 and at the 7th General Medical Assembly in 2003 in order to update the Code according to the current developments, e.g. new provisions on the relations between the physician and the medical industry were introduced.

== Affiliations ==
The Polish Chamber of Physicians and Dentists is active in the works of the following international organizations of doctors and dental practitioners:

- Standing Committee of European Doctors,
- European Union of Medical Specialists,
- European Forum of Medical Associations and the World Health Organization,
- Council of European Dentists,
- World Dental Federation.
