= Gmina Stromiec =

Gmina Stromiec Stromiec Commune
- Gmina
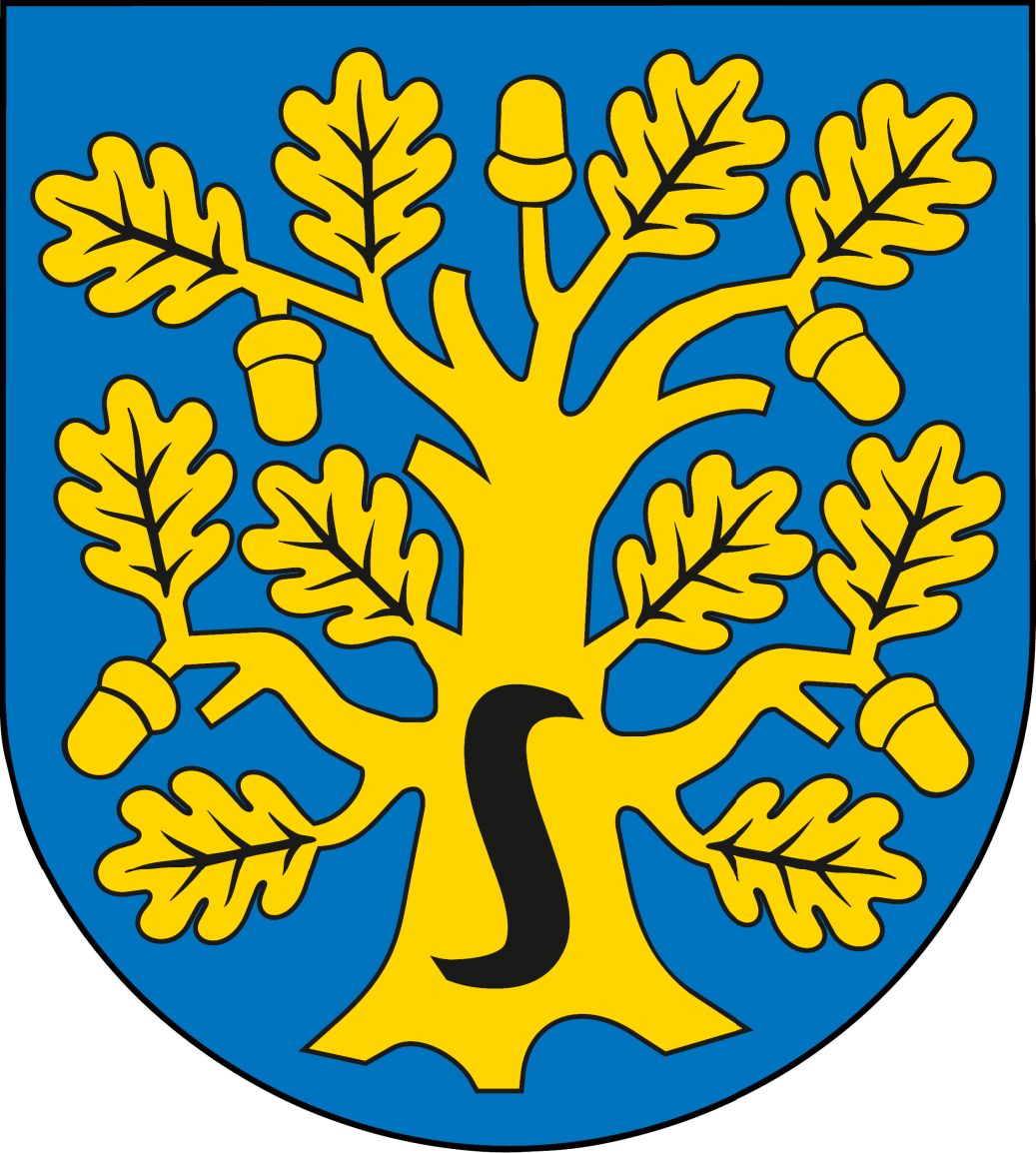
- Coat of arms
- Interactive map of Gmina Stromiec
- Coordinates (Stromiec): 51°38′32″N 21°5′28″E
- Country: Poland
- Voivodeship: Masovian
- County: Białobrzegi
- Seat: Stromiec

Area
  - Total: 156.47 km^{2} (60.41 sq mi)

Population (2006)
  - Total: 5,618
  - Density: 35.90/km^{2} (92.99/sq mi)
- Website: https://www.stromiec.com

Gmina Stromiec is a rural gmina (administrative district) in Białobrzegi County, Masovian Voivodeship, in east-central Poland. Its seat is the village of Stromiec, which lies approximately 10 kilometres (6 mi) east of Białobrzegi and 65 km (40 mi) south of Warsaw.

The gmina covers an area of 156.47 square kilometres (60.4 sq mi), and as of 2006 its total population is 5,618.

== Villages ==
Gmina Stromiec contains the villages and settlements of Biała Góra, Bobrek, Bobrek-Kolonia, Boska Wola, Boże, Dobieszyn, Ducka Wola, Grabowy Las, Kolonia Sielce, Krzemień, Ksawerów Nowy, Ksawerów Stary, Lipskie Budy, Małe Boże, Marianki, Matyldzin, Mokry Las, Nętne, Niedabyl, Olszowa Dąbrowa, Pietrusin, Piróg, Podlesie Duże, Pokrzywna, Sielce, Stara Wieś, Stromiec, Stromiecka Wola, Sułków and Zabagnie.

== Neighbouring gminas ==
Gmina Stromiec is bordered by the gminas of Białobrzegi, Głowaczów, Grabów nad Pilicą, Jedlińsk, Stara Błotnica and Warka.
