= Cyprus Association of Research and Development Pharmaceutical Companies =

The Cyprus Association of Research and Development Pharmaceutical Companies is a trade association in Cyprus, established in 2006.

It welcomed the establishment of Gesy, the national health system of Cyprus, in 2017. In November 2022 it organised a conference entitled A New Era for Health Care in Cyprus: Embrace, Evaluate, Evolve to review the steps and achievements in the three years since the introduction of GESY.

Kyriakos Mikellis was re-elected president in 2022.
