= Gradus Gravis affair =

2003 medical affair in Estonia

The Gradus Gravis affair (in English: Serious Degree) was a scheme of people operating in Tallinn providing prescriptions of controlled psychotropic drugs to people, mostly of Finnish origin, for a fee.

== Scheme ==
Gradus Gravis OÜ, once a fully licensed psychiatric clinic, opened an office near the Tallinn Passenger Port — thus, being easily accessible to people of Helsinki —, offering prescriptions of certain controlled psychotropic drugs (most notably Subutex) to everybody who would pay a fee.

According to the Health Board, Milvi Koplus issued about 7000 prescriptions for Subutex within four months of 2003.

In connection with the affair, Estonian Medical Association cancelled membership of Rostislav Vassiljev and Milvi Koplus in 2007. This was the first case of the association cancelling membership for ethical issues.

Due to the scheme becoming public, as well as reporting irregularities, the Estonian Office of Healthcare revoked the clinic's license in 2008. However, according to enquiries to four apothecaries operating near the premises, the clinic issued at least 259 prescriptions for strong psychotropic medicine in the month after the revocation, 221 of them to citizens of Finland.

== See also ==
- Milvi Koplus

== Sources ==
- Õhtuleht 14 March 2007 20:49: http://www.ohtuleht.ee/index.aspx?id=221428 Pealtnägija: läbi Tallinna arstide käib ulatuslik narkoäri
- Eesti Päevaleht 15 March 2007 07:06: Eesti pättarstid toidavad Soome narkoturgu, edited by Haldi Ellam
- Eesti Päevaleht 15 July 2008: Sadama südames õilmitses ebaseaduslik retseptivabrik
- Helsingin Sanomat 2008-07-16: Controversy in Estonia over easy prescriptions for Finns
- Helsingin Sanomat 2008-07-16: Virolaisklinikka kirjoitti satoja psyykenlääkereseptejä suomalaisille
