= Krzemień, Białobrzegi County =

Krzemień
- Village
- Location within Poland
- Coordinates: 51°43′N 21°7′E
- Country: Poland
- Voivodeship: Masovian
- County: Białobrzegi
- Gmina: Stromiec

Krzemień [ˈkʂɛmjɛɲ] is a village in the administrative district of Gmina Stromiec, within Białobrzegi County, Masovian Voivodeship, in east-central Poland.
