= Biała Góra, Masovian Voivodeship =

Biała Góra
- Village
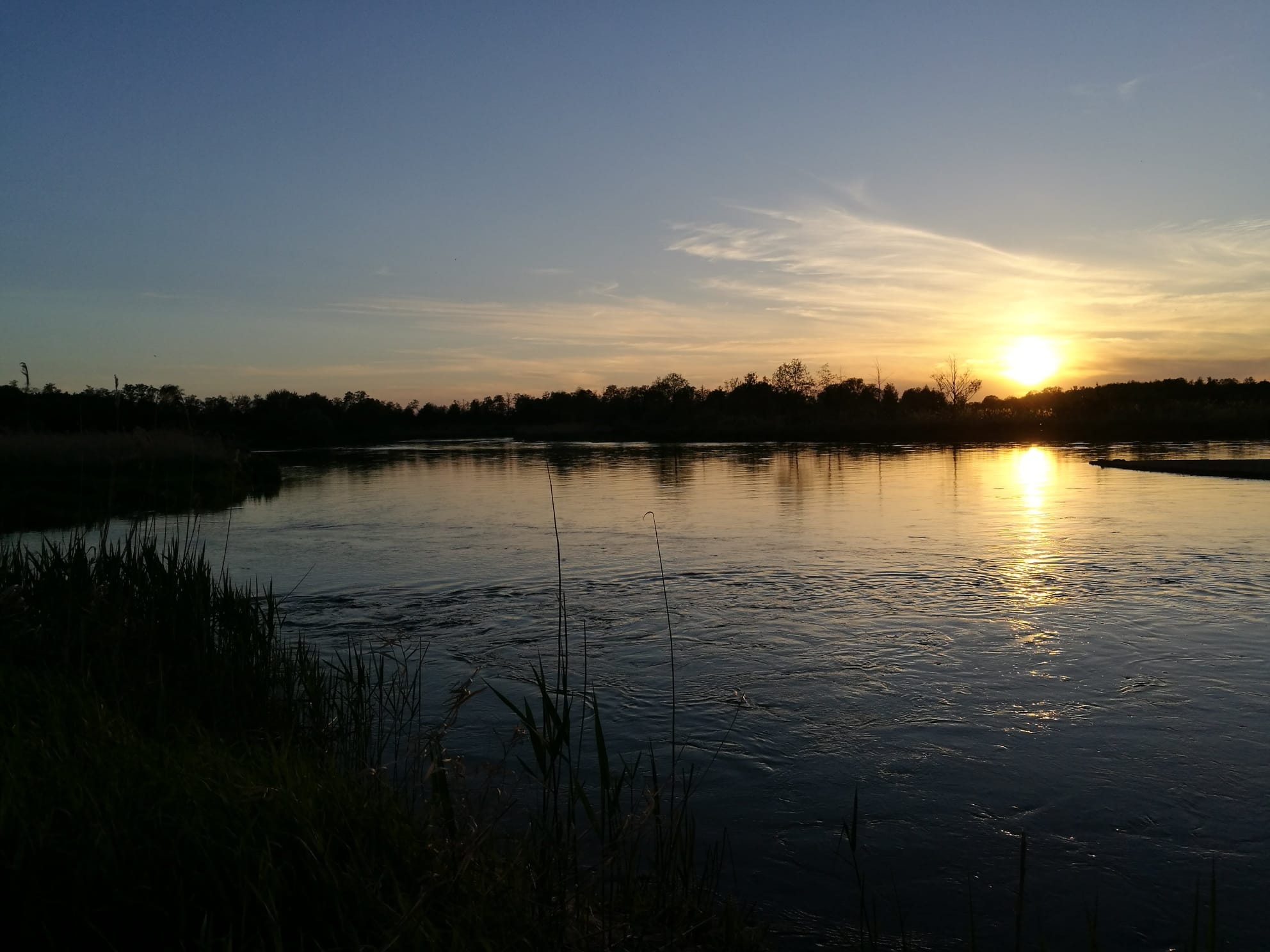
- The Pilica river in Biała Góra

- Location within Poland
- Coordinates: 51°43′3″N 21°6′15″E
- Country: Poland
- Voivodeship: Masovian
- County: Białobrzegi
- Gmina: Stromiec
- Population (2023): 52

Biała Góra [ˈbjawa ˈɡura] is a village in the administrative district of Gmina Stromiec, within Białobrzegi County, Masovian Voivodeship, in east-central Poland.

In years 1975–1998 it was part of the Radom Voivodeship.

== History ==
Within the boundaries of the present-day village of Biała Góra is the former village of Zator.

During the early reign of the Piast dynasty, there was a gord in the village, which was a princely property. In 1471, Prince Bolesław V gave the village to Jakub, the castellan of Czersk, who in return relinquished the debt of 24 thousand groszy lent to Bolesław IV.

Around 1890 in the village there were 10 houses, 69 inhabitants, 133 landed morgens. The village was listed on the Austrian quartermaster map of 1910.

The present-day village is situated among forests and on the Pilica River and functions as a holiday resort. There are many resorts and private holiday cottages. In the village, the Dyga River flows into the Pilica.
