= Pietrusin =

- Village
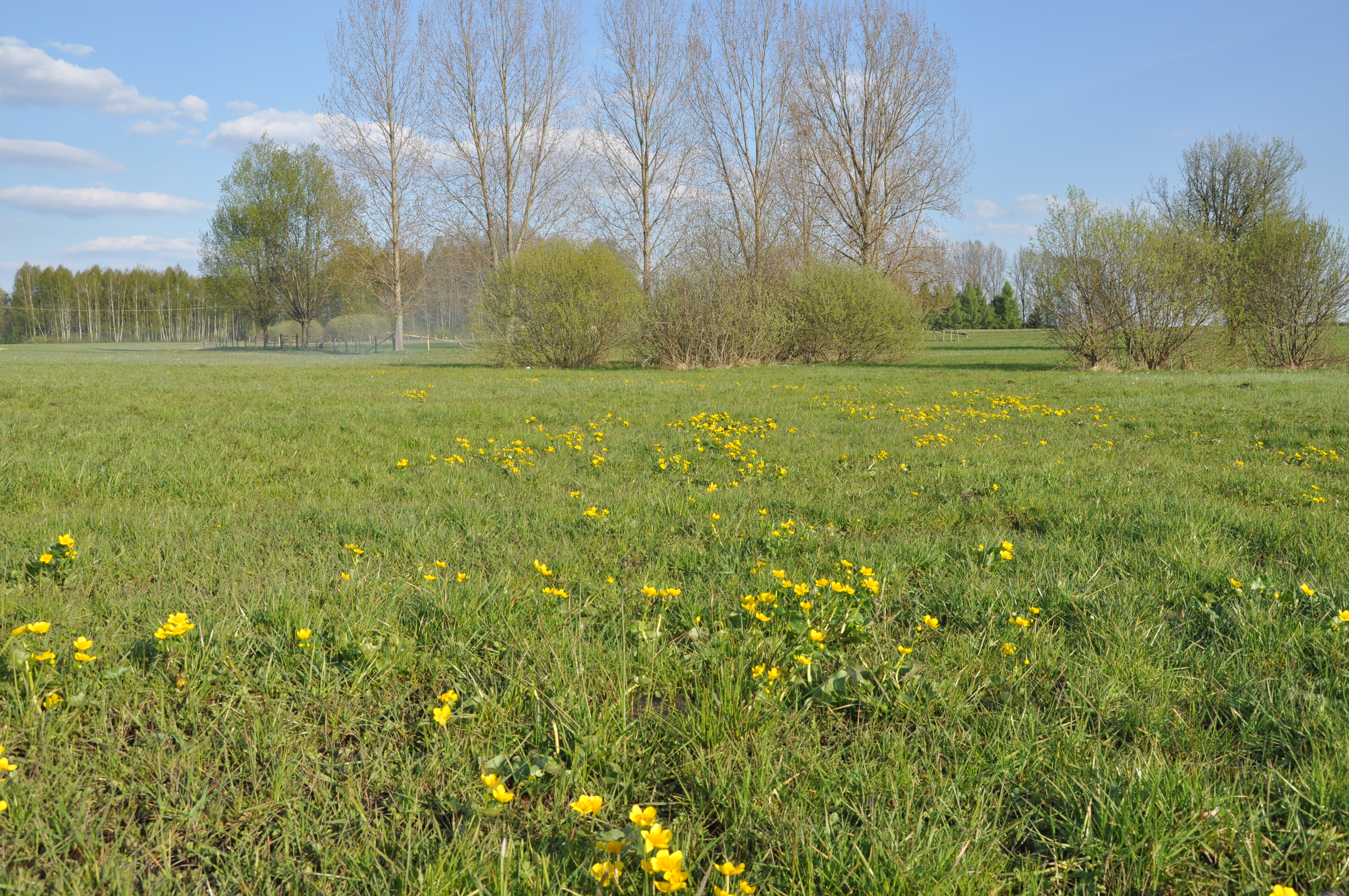
- Meadows and pastures in Pietrusin

- Location within Poland
- Coordinates: 51°39′03″N 21°04′03″E
- Country: Poland
- Voivodeship: Masovian
- County: Białobrzegi
- Gmina: Stromiec

Pietrusin [pjɛˈtruɕin] is a village in the administrative district of Gmina Stromiec, within Białobrzegi County, Masovian Voivodeship, in east-central Poland.
