= Sułków, Masovian Voivodeship =

Sułków
- Village
- Location within Poland
- Coordinates: 51°37′N 21°13′E
- Country: Poland
- Voivodeship: Masovian
- County: Białobrzegi
- Gmina: Stromiec

Sułków [ˈsuu̯kuf] is a village in the administrative district of Gmina Stromiec, within Białobrzegi County, Masovian Voivodeship, in east-central Poland.
