= Podlesie Duże, Masovian Voivodeship =

Podlesie Duże
- Village
- Location within Poland
- Coordinates: 51°37′41″N 21°09′18″E
- County: Białobrzegi
- Gmina: Stromiec

Podlesie Duże [pɔdˈlɛɕɛ ˈduʐɛ] is a village in the administrative district of Gmina Stromiec, within Białobrzegi County, Masovian Voivodeship, in east-central Poland.
