= Stara Wieś, Białobrzegi County =

Stara Wieś
- Village
- Location within Poland
- Coordinates: 51°39′55″N 21°3′39″E
- Country: Poland
- Voivodeship: Masovian
- County: Białobrzegi
- Gmina: Stromiec

Stara Wieś [ˈstara ˈvjɛɕ] is a village in the administrative district of Gmina Stromiec, within Białobrzegi County, Masovian Voivodeship, in east-central Poland.
