= European Union of Medical Specialists =

Doctors professional organization in Europe

- Formation: 1958
- Type: NGO
- Region served: European Union
- Members: National Medical Associations
- President: Prof. Vassilios Papalois (United Kingdom)
- Secretary General: Dr João Grenho (Portugal)
- Website: www.uems.eu

The European Union of Medical Specialists (UEMS: Union Européenne des Médecins Spécialistes) is a professional organization of doctors representing medical specialists in the European Union, which was founded in 1958. It is the oldest medical organization in Europe, and represents about 1.6 million medical specialists. It promotes high levels of medical training and practice, to improve and guarantee the highest level of patient care.

With a current membership from 41 countries, it is the representative organization of the National Associations of Medical Specialists in the European Union and its associated countries.

More than fifty medical disciplines and competences are represented within the organization. Among them, there are 43 Specialist Sections which represent full medical specialties recognized in all European countries. Together with European Scientific Societies, they created European Boards with the aim to define European standards of medical education of training, through the creation of European Training Requirements and European Examinations. Sections also contribute to the work of Multidisciplinary Joint Committees which address fields of multidisciplinary nature.

The European Union of Medical Specialists is responsible for accreditation of Continuing Medical Education through the EACCME.

== European CME accreditation: EACCME ==
European accreditation through UEMS-EACCME means that a CME activity, event, program or e-learning material has fulfilled the UEMS-EACCME quality requirements. Accreditation will only be provided if the CME activity or material has a high quality scientific content and an appropriate educational approach, and if it is a free of commercial bias.

EACCME credits are recognized by National Accreditation Authorities in Europe as well as in other non-EU countries.

In addition to European countries, EACCME accreditation has agreements of mutual recognition with the United States and Canada.

== List of members ==
=== Full members ===
- Austria: Austrian Medical Association / Österreichische Arztekammer
- Belgium: Groupement des Unions Professionnelles Belges de Médecins Spécialistes – Verbond der Belgische Beroepsverenigingen van Geneescheren Specialisten (GBS-VBS)
- Bulgaria : Bulgarian Medical Association
- Croatia: Croatian Medical Association
- Cyprus: Cyprus Medical Association
- Czech Republic: Czech Medical Association J.E. Purkyne
- Denmark: Danish Medical Association / Den Almindelige Danske Laegeforening
- Estonia: Estonian Medical Association / Eesti Arstide Liit
- Finland: Finnish Medical Association / Suomen Laakarilitto
- France: Union Nationale des Médecins Spécialistes Confédérés (UMESPE)
- Germany : Spitzenverband Fachärzte Deutschlands e.V. (SpiFa)
- Greece: Panhellenic Medical Association
- Hungary: Association of Hungarian Medical Societies (MOTESZ)
- Iceland: Icelandic Medical Association / Laeknafelag Islands
- Ireland: Irish Medical Association
- Italy: Federazione Nazionale degli Ordini dei Medici Chirurghi e degli Odontoiatri (FNOMCeO)
- Latvia : Latvian Medical Association
- Lithuania : Lithuanian Medical Association
- Luxembourg : Association des Médecins et Médecins Dentistes
- Malta : Medical Association of Malta
- Netherlands: Federatie Medisch Specialisten
- Norway: Norwegian Medical Association / den Norske Legeforening
- Poland: Polish Chamber of Physicians and Dentists
- Portugal: Portuguese Medical Association / Ordem dos Medicos
- Romania: Romanian College of Physicians, Romanian Medical Association
- Slovakia: Slovak Medical Association
- Slovenia: Medical Chamber of Slovenia
- Spain: General Medical Council of Spain / Consejo General de Colegios Medicos
- Sweden: Swedish Medical Association
- Switzerland: Swiss Medical Association
- United Kingdom: British Medical Association

=== Associate members ===
- Armenia: Armenian Medical Association
- Israel: Israeli Medical Association
- Serbia: Serbian Medical Chamber
- Turkey: Turkish Medical Association
- Ukraine: Ukrainian Medical Association

=== Observers ===
- Georgia: Georgian Association of Medical Specialists
- Iraq: the Arab Board of Health Specializations in Iraq
- Lebanon: Lebanese Order of Physicians
- Morocco: Collège Syndical National des Médecins
- Tunisia : Ordre des Médecins de Tunisie

== Medical specialties represented ==
The UEMS represents more than 50 medical disciplines through various bodies and structures. The most important ones are the 43 Specialist Sections, which represent independently recognized specialties. They have created a European Board as a subgroup, in conjunction with the relevant European Society, with a view to defining European standards of medical education and training. They also contribute to the work of Multidisciplinary Joint Committees (MJC) which address fields of a multidisciplinary nature.

== List of UEMS activities ==
=== EU Affairs ===
- Involvement in the Directive 2005/26/EC on Professional Qualifications and its following updates. This directive’s aim was to coordinate the system of mutual recognition of professional qualification in EU/EEA countries, including medical specialists, to facilitate professional mobility.
- Involvement in the EU Commission’s Joint Action on Healthcare Workforce. Its purpose it to sustain cross-country cooperation and provide support to Member States to increase their knowledge and achieve a higher effectiveness in health workforce planning and policy.
- Involvement in the European Reference Networks which are virtual networks involving healthcare providers across Europe. The aim is to facilitate discussion on complex or rare diseases and conditions that require highly specialized treatment and concentrated knowledge and resources.
- The UEMS collaborates with the Commission on the following topics as well: e-Health, Health Technology Assessment (HTA).

=== Accreditation and Postgraduate Training ===
- Accreditation of more than 2000 Live Educational Events and more than a hundred E-learning materials each year.
- More than 40 European Training Requirements (ETRs) setting the highest standards in specialty medical training. They are used as a reference in several countries.
- More than 30 European Examinations organized each year and their quality control through appraisals by the UEMS Council for European Specialist Medical Assessment (CESMA)
- 8 Medical Training Centers accredited by the UEMS Network of Accredited Skills Centers in Europe (NASCE).

== Sources ==
- Bisdorff, Alexandre (2012-05-01). "Forum: UEMS – European Union of Medical Specialists". European Federation of Neurological Societies.
- "Medical Specialities". UEMS. Archived from the original on 2013-01-18.
