= Sielce, Gmina Stromiec =

Sielce
- Village
- Location within Poland
- Coordinates: 51°37′00″N 21°12′52″E
- Country: Poland
- Voivodeship: Masovian
- County: Białobrzegi
- Gmina: Stromiec

Sielce [ˈɕɛlt͡sɛ] is a village in the administrative district of Gmina Stromiec, within Białobrzegi County, Masovian Voivodeship, in east-central Poland.
