= Marianki, Białobrzegi County =

Marianki
- Village
- Location within Poland
- Coordinates: 51°37′5″N 21°5′47″E
- Country: Poland
- Voivodeship: Masovian
- County: Białobrzegi
- Gmina: Stromiec

Marianki [maˈrjaŋki] is a village in the administrative district of Gmina Stromiec, within Białobrzegi County, Masovian Voivodeship, in east-central Poland.
