= Bobrek-Kolonia =

- Village
- Location within Poland
- Coordinates: 51°36′49″N 21°3′33″E
- Country: Poland
- Voivodeship: Masovian
- County: Białobrzegi
- Gmina: Stromiec

Bobrek-Kolonia [ˈbɔbrɛk kɔˈlɔɲa] is a village in the administrative district of Gmina Stromiec, within Białobrzegi County, Masovian Voivodeship, in east-central Poland.
