= Pokrzywna, Masovian Voivodeship =

Pokrzywna
- Village
- Location within Poland
- Coordinates: 51°40′20″N 21°2′58″E
- Country: Poland
- Voivodeship: Masovian
- County: Białobrzegi
- Gmina: Stromiec
- Population: 160

Pokrzywna [pɔˈkʂɨvna] is a village in the administrative district of Gmina Stromiec, within Białobrzegi County, Masovian Voivodeship, in east-central Poland.
