= Stromiec =

- Village
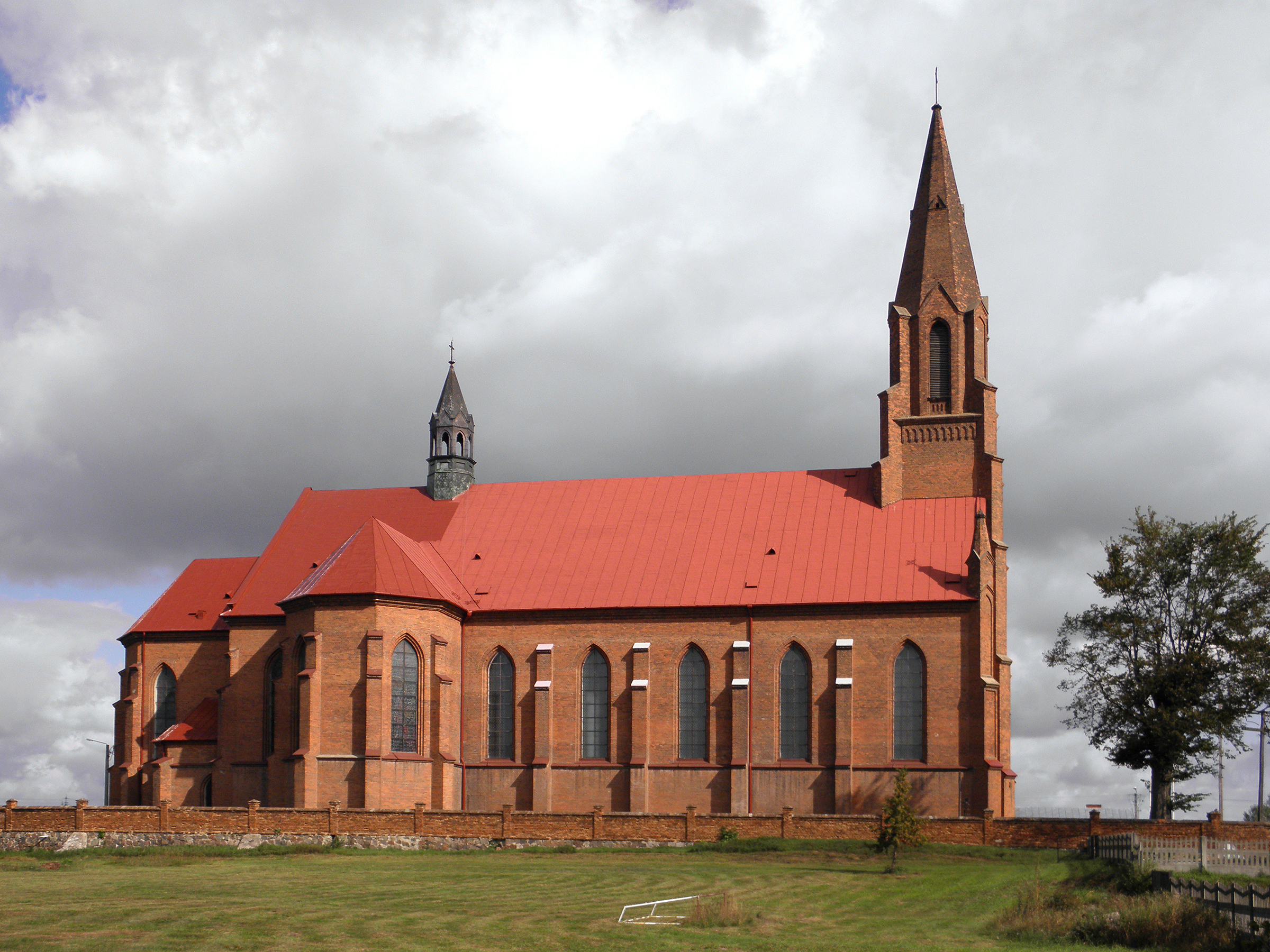
- John the Baptist Church in Stromiec

- Location within Poland
- Coordinates: 51°38′32″N 21°5′28″E
- Country: Poland
- Voivodeship: Masovian
- County: Białobrzegi
- Gmina: Stromiec

Population (2006)
  - Total: 909
- Time zone: UTC+1 (CET)
  - Summer (DST): UTC+2 (CEST)
- Vehicle registration: WBR

Stromiec [ˈstrɔmjɛt͡s] is a village in Białobrzegi County, Masovian Voivodeship, in east-central Poland. It is the seat of the gmina (administrative district) called Gmina Stromiec. It is located in the historic region of Zapilicze in the larger historic region of Mazovia.

In 2006 the village had a population of 909.

== History ==
Following the German-Soviet invasion of Poland, which started World War II in September 1939, the village was occupied by Germany until 1945. The local Polish police chief was murdered by the Russians in the Katyn massacre in 1940.

From 1975 to 1998 the village was in Radom Voivodeship.

== Demographics ==
Historical population
Year	Pop.	±%
1827	390	—
1880	644	+65.1%
