= Dobieszyn, Masovian Voivodeship =

Dobieszyn
- Village
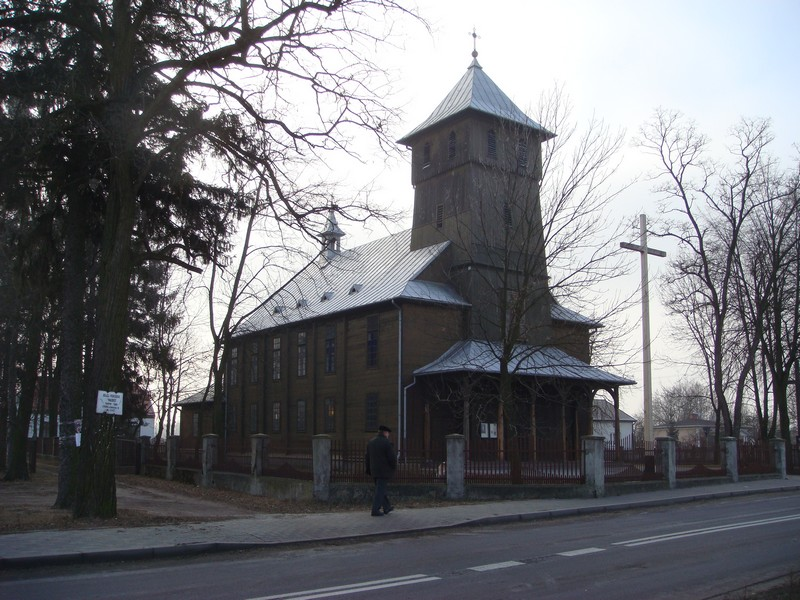

- Location within Poland
- Coordinates: 51°37′N 21°11′E
- Country: Poland
- Voivodeship: Masovian
- County: Białobrzegi
- Gmina: Stromiec
- Population: 370

Dobieszyn [dɔˈbjɛʂɨn] is a village in the administrative district of Gmina Stromiec, within Białobrzegi County, Masovian Voivodeship, in east-central Poland.
