= Cyprus Medical Association =

- Pancyprian Medical Association
- Formation: 1967
- Headquarters: Cyprus
- Region served: Cyprus
- Members: Doctors / Medical Practitioners
- President: Petros Agathangelou

The Cyprus Medical Association, also translated as the Pancyprian Medical Association, is a professional organisation of doctors in Cyprus, founded in 1967. It negotiates with the Health Insurance Organisation on behalf of doctors.

In 2018, they were arguing for the national budget of Gesy to be increased by €100m to finance an increase from €60 per adult patient to €100, and €120 per head for child patients, and suggesting that patients' financial contributions should go directly to the doctors. The annual income for pediatricians would be €24,000.

Dr. Petros Agathangelou, president of the Association, was appointed a board member of the Health Insurance Organisation in 2022, but resigned after two weeks following complaints that he represented private doctors, who have a vested interest in it as contractors.

Sebnem Korur Fincanci, the head of the association, was detained by Turkish police in October 2022 for allegedly “spreading terrorist group propaganda”, in relation to comments she made about alleged chemical weapons’ use by the Turkish armed forces.
