= Zdzisław Sipiera =

Polish politician (born 1959)

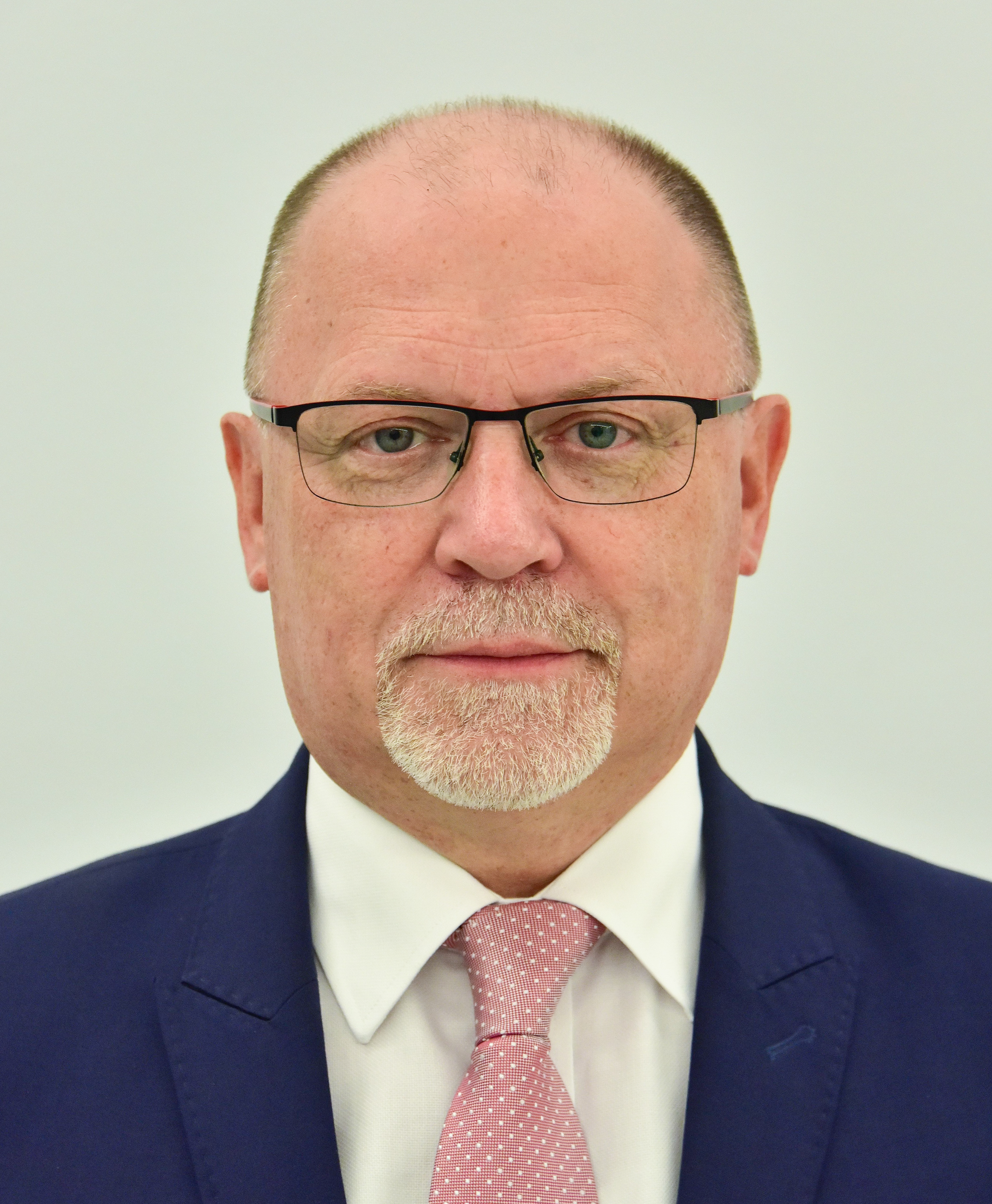
- Sipiera in 2019.

Member of the Masovian Voivodeship Sejmik
- Incumbent
- Assumed office 2024
- Constituency: No. 7

Member of the Sejm of Poland
- In office 12 November 2019 – 12 November 2023
- Constituency: No. 20

Voivode of the Masovian Voivodeship
- In office 8 December 2015 – 11 November 2019
- Preceded by: Jacek Kozłowski
- Succeeded by: Konstanty Radziwiłł

Member of the Pruszków County Council
- In office 1998–2018

Alderman of Pruszków County
- In office 2014–2015
- Preceded by: Elżbieta Smolińska
- Succeeded by: Maksym Gołoś
- In office 1998–2002
- Preceded by: Office established
- Succeeded by: Elżbieta Smolińska

Mayor of Wola
- In office 2005–2006
- Preceded by: Marek Szymański
- Succeeded by: Marek Andruk

Deputy mayor of Praga-North
- In office 2002–2005

Member of the Pruszków City Council
- In office 1994–1998

Personal details
- Born: 27 October 1959 (age 66) Pruszków, Poland
- Party: Law and Justice (since 2001)
- Other political affiliations: Centre Agreement (1999–2001)
- Education: Józef Piłsudski University of Physical Education; University of Warsaw
- Occupation: Politician

Zdzisław Tadeusz Sipiera (Polish: [ˈzd͡ʑi.swaf taˈdɛ.uʂ ɕiˈpjɛ.ra]; born 27 October 1959) is a Polish politician. He is a member of the Masovian Voivodeship Sejmik, and from 2019 to 2023, he was a member of the Sejm of Poland. He was the voivode of the Masovian Voivodeship from 2015 to 2019. He belongs to the Law and Justice party.

== Biography ==
Zdzisław Sipiera was born on 27 October 1959 in Pruszków, Poland. He graduated from the Józef Piłsudski University of Physical Education in Warsaw, and later also graduated from the University of Warsaw with degrees in administration and law. Sipiera worked as a school teacher, and from 1991 to 1996, he was a head teacher of a school in Pruszków. He also worked as a director of the education department of the city hall of the Żoliborz district in Warsaw. He was also a businessowner.

In 1990, Sipiera joined the Centre Agreement party, and in 2001, the Law and Justice party. From 1994 to 1998, he was a councilor in Pruszków, and from 1998 to 2018, he was a member of the council of Pruszków County. From 1998 and 2002, and from 2014 to 2015, he was a alderman of Pruszków County. Sipiera was also a deputy mayor of the Praga-North district in Warsaw from 2002 to 2005, and a mayor of the Wola district in Warsaw from 2005 to 2006.

On 8 December 2015, Sipiera was appointed as a voivode of the Masovian Voivodeship. In 2019, he was elected to the Sejm of Poland, from the constituency no. 20, which consist of several counties around Warsaw. To take the office, he resigned as voivode on 11 November 2019. In 2021, he was appointed as a member of the Council of Political Advisors of the Prime Minister of Poland Mateusz Morawiecki. He lost reelection to the Sejm in 2023. In 2024, he was elected as a member of the Masovian Voivodeship Sejmik.

== Personal life ==
He has a wife and two children, including Konrad Sipiera, who was a deputy mayor of Pruszków.

== Decorations and awards ==
- Knight's Cross of the Order of Polonia Restituta (2024)
