= Health Insurance Organisation =

Cyprus state healthcare

The Health Insurance Organisation is a state agency which runs the healthcare system in Cyprus. It manages a budget of €1 billion that funds the Gesy system.

It negotiates with the Cyprus Medical Association.

It was criticised by the official audit in 2018 which said that “Execution of important projects that are necessary for the implementation of the Gesy like reorganization/autonomy of state hospitals, which should have been handled as a matter of priority have been greatly delayed.” There were no established criteria for selecting overseas centres for patients requiring treatments unavailable on the island. Most patients were sent to UK, Germany, Greece, and Israel but the financial arrangements were unsatisfactory. In 2016, 276 patients were sent to Germany at a cost of about €5.2 million, and 426 to Greece at a cost of about €3 million.

The law prohibits private doctors from treating Gesy patients in hospitals contracted to the organisation. However, since 2020 it has turned a blind eye to this unlawful practice. It is alleged that the organisation lacks accountability because everyone supports Gesy and credits the organisation for its operation and that private hospitals outside Gesy are pressured by this powerful monopoly, until they are also forced to join.
