= Piróg =

- Village
- Location within Poland
- Coordinates: 51°38′N 21°5′E
- Country: Poland
- Voivodeship: Masovian
- County: Białobrzegi
- Gmina: Stromiec

Piróg [ˈpiruk] is a village in the administrative district of Gmina Stromiec, within Białobrzegi County, Masovian Voivodeship, in east-central Poland.
