= Tobiasz Bocheński =

Polish politician (born 1987)

Tobiasz Bocheński MEP
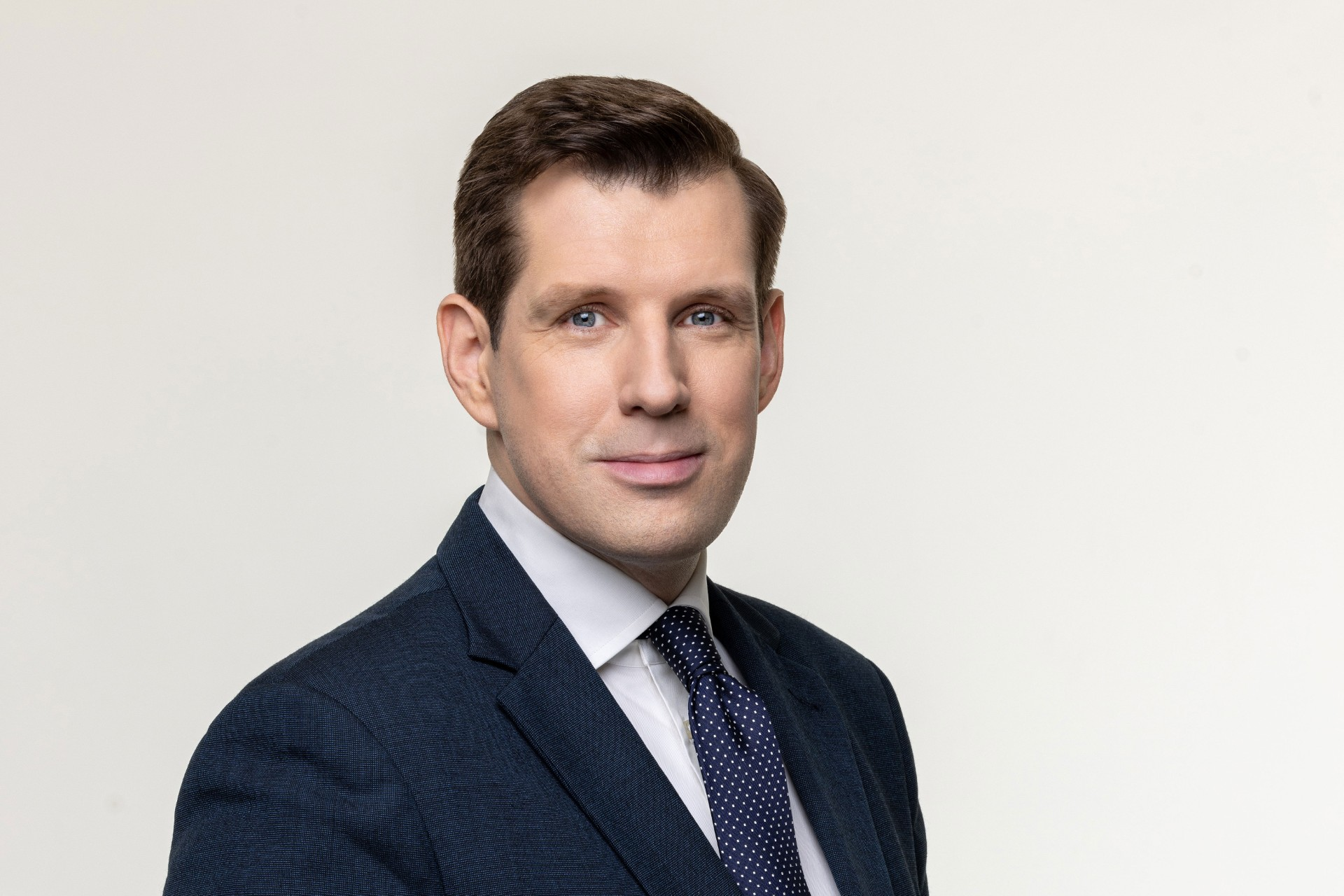
- Bocheński in 2024

Member of the European Parliament
- Incumbent
- Assumed office 16 July 2024
- Constituency: Warsaw

Voivode of the Masovian Voivodeship
- In office 18 April 2023 – 13 December 2023
- Preceded by: Konstanty Radziwiłł
- Succeeded by: Mariusz Frankowski

Voivode of the Łódź Voivodeship
- In office 25 November 2019 – 18 April 2023
- Preceded by: Zbigniew Rau
- Succeeded by: Karol Młynarczyk

Personal details
- Born: 15 December 1987 (age 38) Łódź, Poland
- Party: Law and Justice (since 2024)
- Other political affiliations: European Conservatives and Reformists Party
- Spouse: Elżbieta Bocheńska

Tobiasz Adam Bocheński (born 15 December 1987) is a Polish politician affiliated with the Law and Justice party who was elected member of the European Parliament in 2024. He served as voivode of Łódź from 2019 to 2023, and as voivode of Masovia in 2023.

In the 2024 local elections, he ran for mayor of Warsaw, finishing second to incumbent Rafał Trzaskowski.
