= General Health System (Cyprus) =

Universal health insurance system of Cyprus

GeSY (Greek: Γενικό Σύστημα Υγείας (ΓεΣΥ), Genikó Sýstima Ygeías, English: General Healthcare System, GHS) is the universal health insurance system of Cyprus established in 2017 when three government bills and regulations were agreed by parliament after prolonged negotiation led by health minister Yiorgos Pamboridis.

In November 2022 the Cyprus Association of Research and Development Pharmaceutical Companies organised a conference entitled A New Era for Health Care in Cyprus: Embrace, Evaluate, Evolve to review the steps and achievements in the three years since the introduction of GESY.

The running of these service is in the hands of the Health Insurance Organisation.

== Costs ==
From 1 March 2019 the scheme will cover out-of-hospital care. Employees and pensioners, income-earners will have to contribute 1.7% of their income, employers 1.85%, the state 1.65%, and self-employed people 2.55%. From 1 March 2020 it will include hospital care, and contributions will rise to 2.65% for employees, 2.9% for employers, 4.7% from the state, and 4% for the self-employed. There are co-payments which are capped at €300 per year for patients and €75 per year for low-pension earners and recipients of Guaranteed Minimum Income.
