= Mariusz Frankowski =

Polish politician

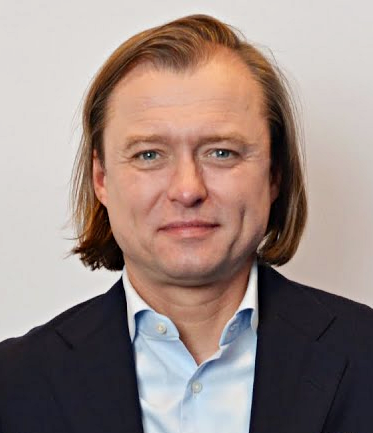
- Frankowski in 2025

Voivode of the Masovian Voivodeship
- Incumbent
- Assumed office 13 December 2023
- Preceded by: Tobiasz Bocheński

Member of the Warsaw City Council
- In office 2014–2023
- Constituency: No. 9

Personal details
- Born: Mariusz Rafał Frankowski; 17 May 1978 (age 48) Gniezno, Poland
- Party: Civic Platform
- Education: Adam Mickiewicz University; University of Warsaw
- Occupation: Politician

Mariusz Rafał Frankowski (Polish: [ˈma.rjuʂ ˈra.faw fraŋˈkɔf.ski]; born 17 May 1978) is a politician and local government official. Since 2023, he is the voivode of the Masovian Voivodeship in Poland, and from 2014 to 2023, he was a member of the Warsaw City Council.

== Biography ==
Mariusz Frankowski was born on 17 May 1978 in Gniezno, Poland. He had graduated from the Adam Mickiewicz University in Poznań, with the degree in the international relations, and from the University of Warsaw with a degree in public administration. He also has postgraduate degree in innovation management from course co-organised by the SGH Warsaw School of Economics and Lake Forest Graduate School of Management in Illinois.

From 2007 he was deputy director of the Department of Strategy and Regional Development of the Marshal Office of the Masovian Voivodeship. From 2011, he led the Masovian Voivodeship Unit of the Implementation of the European Union Funds.

In the 2014 local elections he successfully ran for the office of the member of the Warsaw City Council, as the candidate of the Civic Platform. He was reelected in the 2018 election. In both terms, he was the chairperson of the Commission of the Economic Development. In November 2019 he became a member of the European Committee of the Regions, in which he had joined the European People's Party faction. He was also member of the Commission for Citizenship, Governance, Institutional and External Affairs, and the European Public Communication Conference.

On 13 December 2023, Frankowski was appointed as the Voivode of the Masovian Voivodeship.
