= Anna Żabska =

Polish politician

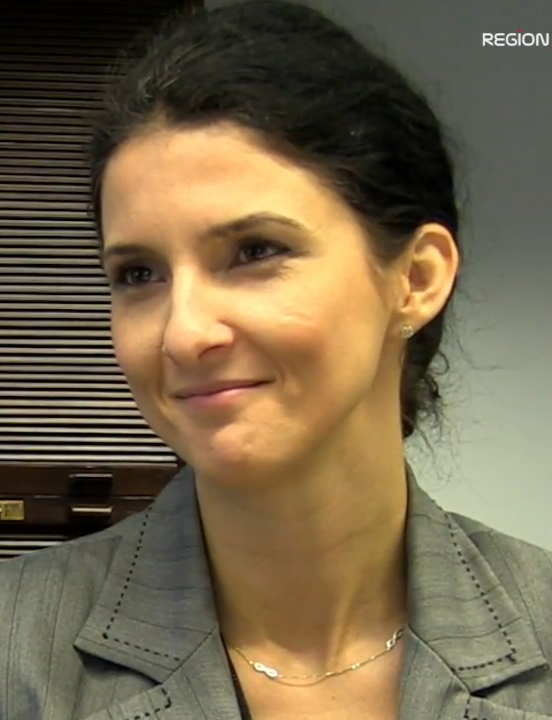

Voivode of Lower Silesian Voivodeship
- Incumbent
- Assumed office 26 November 2024
- President: Andrzej Duda; Karol Nawrocki
- Prime Minister: Donald Tusk
- Preceded by: Maciej Awiżeń

Personal details
- Born: 9 December 1980 (age 45) Wrocław, Polish People's Republic
- Citizenship: Poland
- Party: Independent
- Education: University of Wrocław
- Occupation: Politician

Anna Maria Żabska (born December 9, 1980 in Wrocław) is a Polish lawyer, manager, and local government official. She served as President of the Management Board of the Zamek Książ limited liability company in Wałbrzych (2017–2024), and as Voivode of Lower Silesian Voivodeship since 2024.

== Biography ==
She was born in Wrocław. A graduate of law and international relations at the University of Wrocław. She also completed Postgraduate Studies in Corporate Restructuring and Recovery Management at the Wrocław Business Academy and obtained a certified project manager diploma from the Wrocław School of Economics.

She worked at the Wałbrzych City Hall, where she served as spokesperson and as head of the Office of the Mayor of Wałbrzych, Roman Szełemej. In 2014, she took over as director of the Stara Kopalnia Multicultural Park in Wałbrzych, and in 2017, she became president of the management board of the limited liability company managing Książ Castle in Wałbrzych. She served as president of the management board of the Local Tourist Organization "Agglomeracja Wałbrzyska" and also served on the management board of the Lower Silesian Tourist Organization.

In 2024, she unsuccessfully ran from last place on the Civic Coalition's list in the European Parliament elections from district no. 12 (receiving 18,260 votes). On November 25, 2024, she was appointed Voivode of Lower Silesian Voivodeship (effective the following day). She replaced Maciej Awiżeń in this position.
