= Boże, Masovian Voivodeship =

Boże
- Village
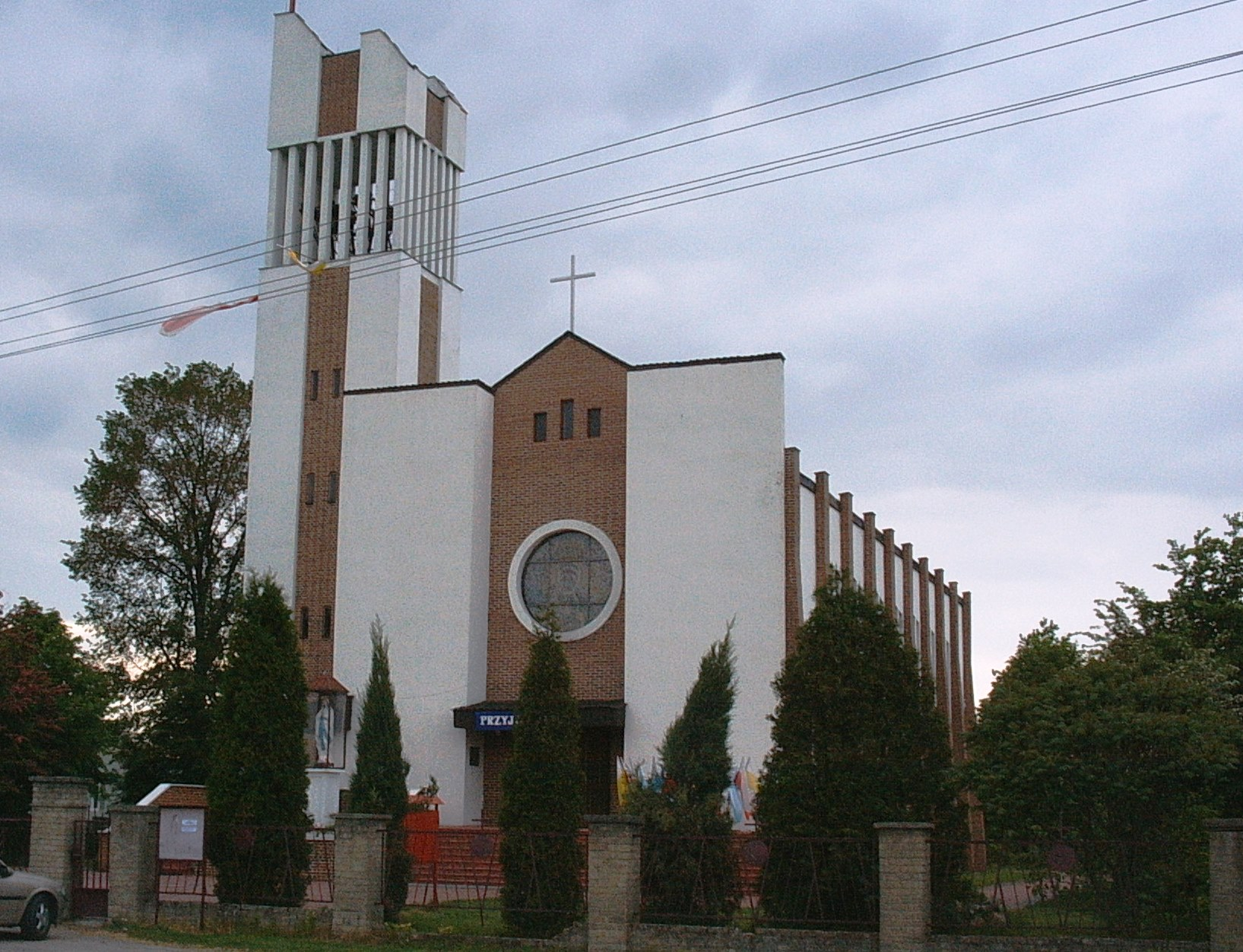
- A church in Boże

- Location within Poland
- Coordinates: 51°41′43″N 21°7′56″E
- Country: Poland
- Voivodeship: Masovian
- County: Białobrzegi
- Gmina: Stromiec
- Population: 220

Boże [ˈbɔʐɛ] is a village in the administrative district of Gmina Stromiec, within Białobrzegi County, Masovian Voivodeship, in east-central Poland.
