= Bobrek, Cieszyn =

Coordinates: 49°45′17″N 18°38′0″E

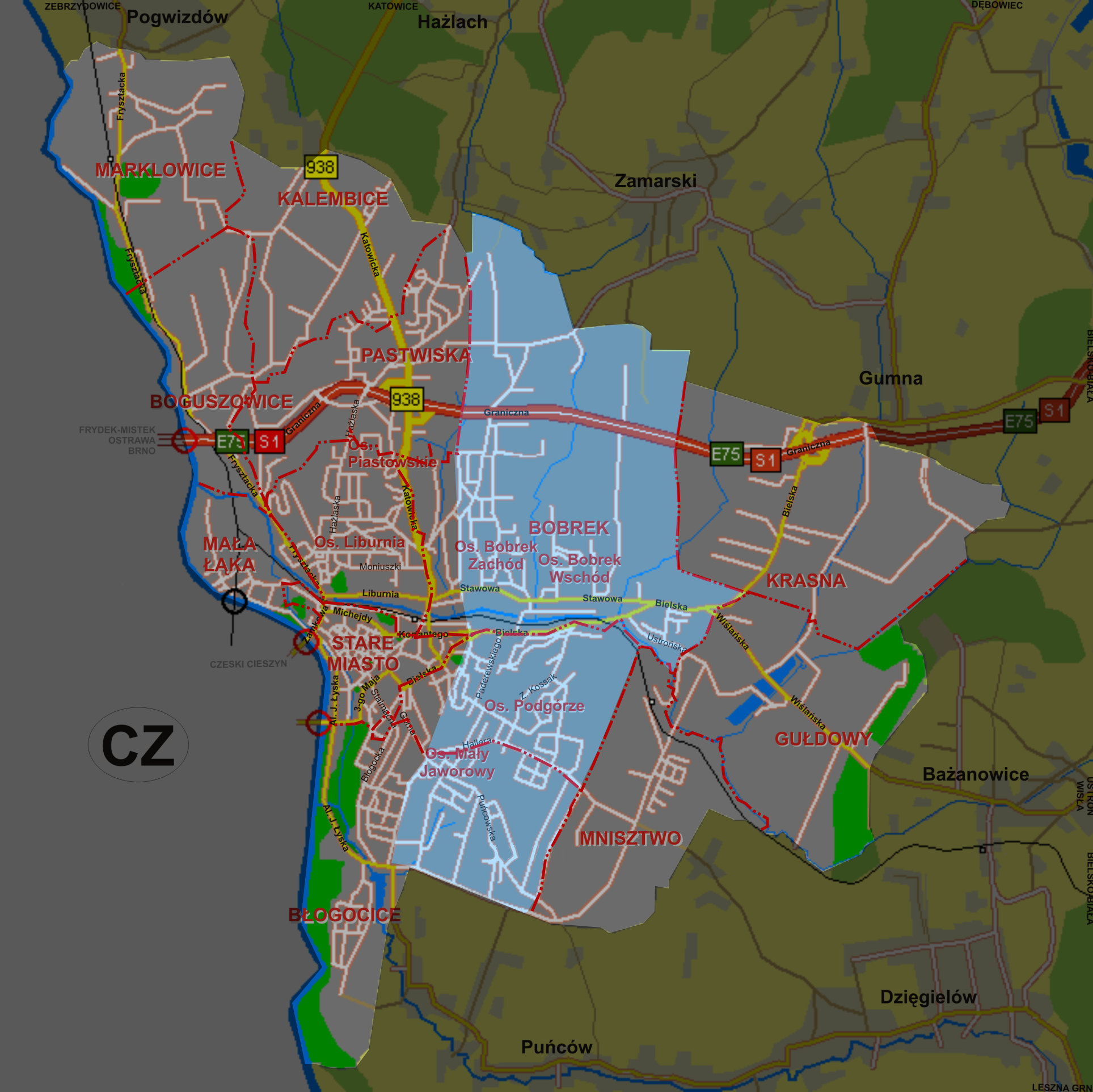
Bobrek in its pre-1932 borders highlighted on map of Cieszyn

Bobrek is a district of Cieszyn, Silesian Voivodeship, Poland. It was a separate municipality, but became administratively a part of Cieszyn in 1932. It had an area of around 767–768 ha.

== History ==
The village was first mentioned in 1322 Later it was mentioned as Bobreg (1365), Bobrek (1440), Bobersdorf (1449), and afterwards mostly as Bobrek with slightly varying spelling.

Politically the village belonged initially to the Duchy of Teschen, formed in 1290 in the process of feudal fragmentation of Poland and was ruled by a local branch of Piast dynasty. In 1327 the duchy became a fee of the Kingdom of Bohemia, which after 1526 became part of the Habsburg monarchy.

In 1802 the village had 464 inhabitants.

After Revolutions of 1848 in the Austrian Empire a modern municipal division was introduced in the re-established Austrian Silesia. The village as a municipality was subscribed to the political and legal district of Cieszyn. According to the censuses conducted in 1880, 1890, 1900 and 1910 the population of the municipality grew from 1109 in 1880 to 2820 in 1910 with a majority being native Polish-speakers (at least 80% in 1880, at most 85.2% in 1890) accompanied by a German-speaking minority (between 14.2% and 17.6%) and Czech-speaking (at most 111 or 4% in 1910). In terms of religion in 1910 majority were Roman Catholics (10724 or 61.2%), followed by Protestants (1073 or 38%), Jews (17 or 0.6%) and 6 people adhering to another faiths. The village was also traditionally inhabited by Cieszyn Vlachs, speaking Cieszyn Silesian dialect.

The cemetery in Bobrek was built in 1900.

After World War I, fall of Austria-Hungary, Polish–Czechoslovak War and the division of Cieszyn Silesia in 1920, it became a part of Poland. At the time it was being absorbed by Cieszyn it had 2984 inhabitants.

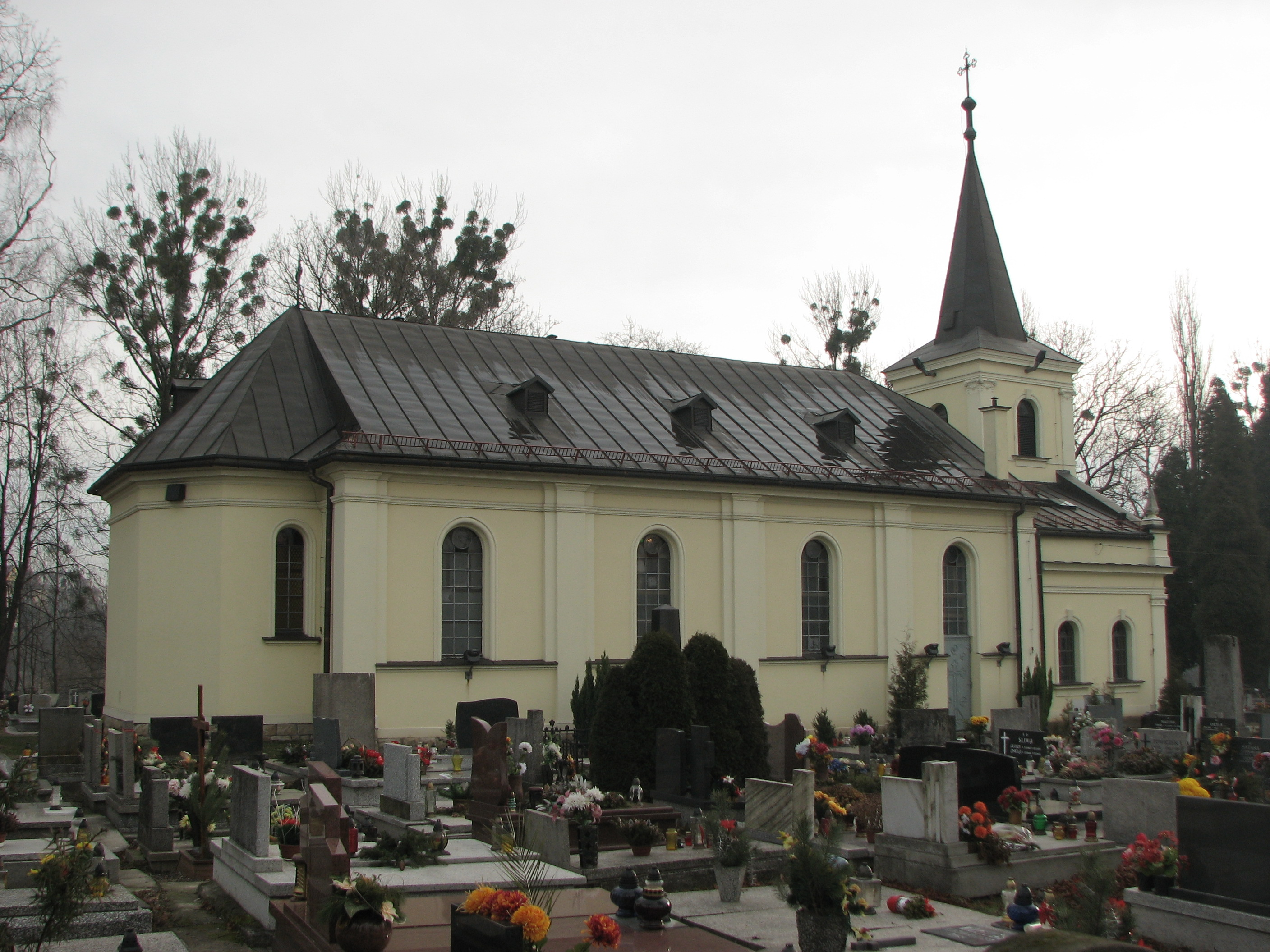
Catholic church in Bobrek

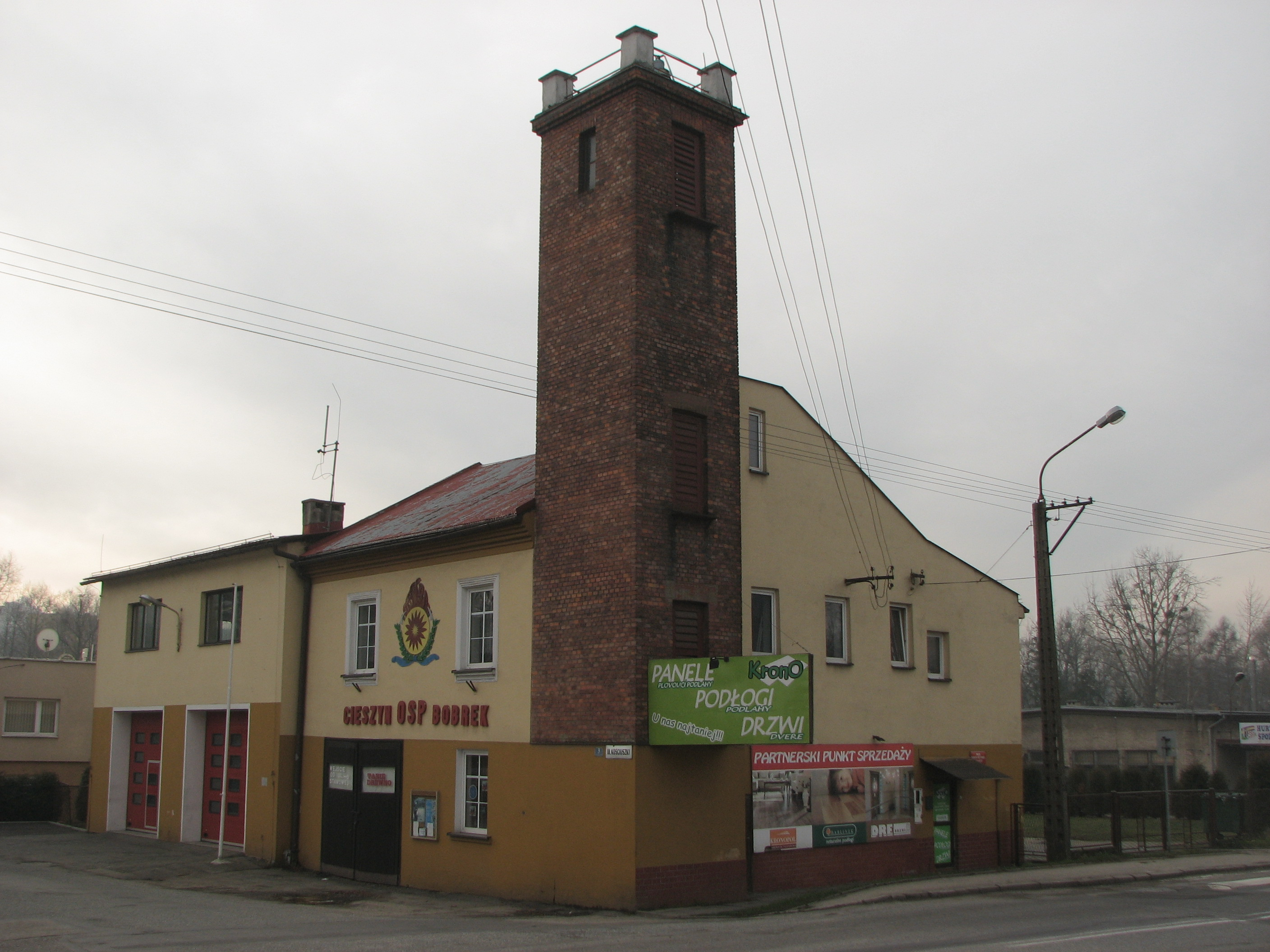
Fire department in Bobrek

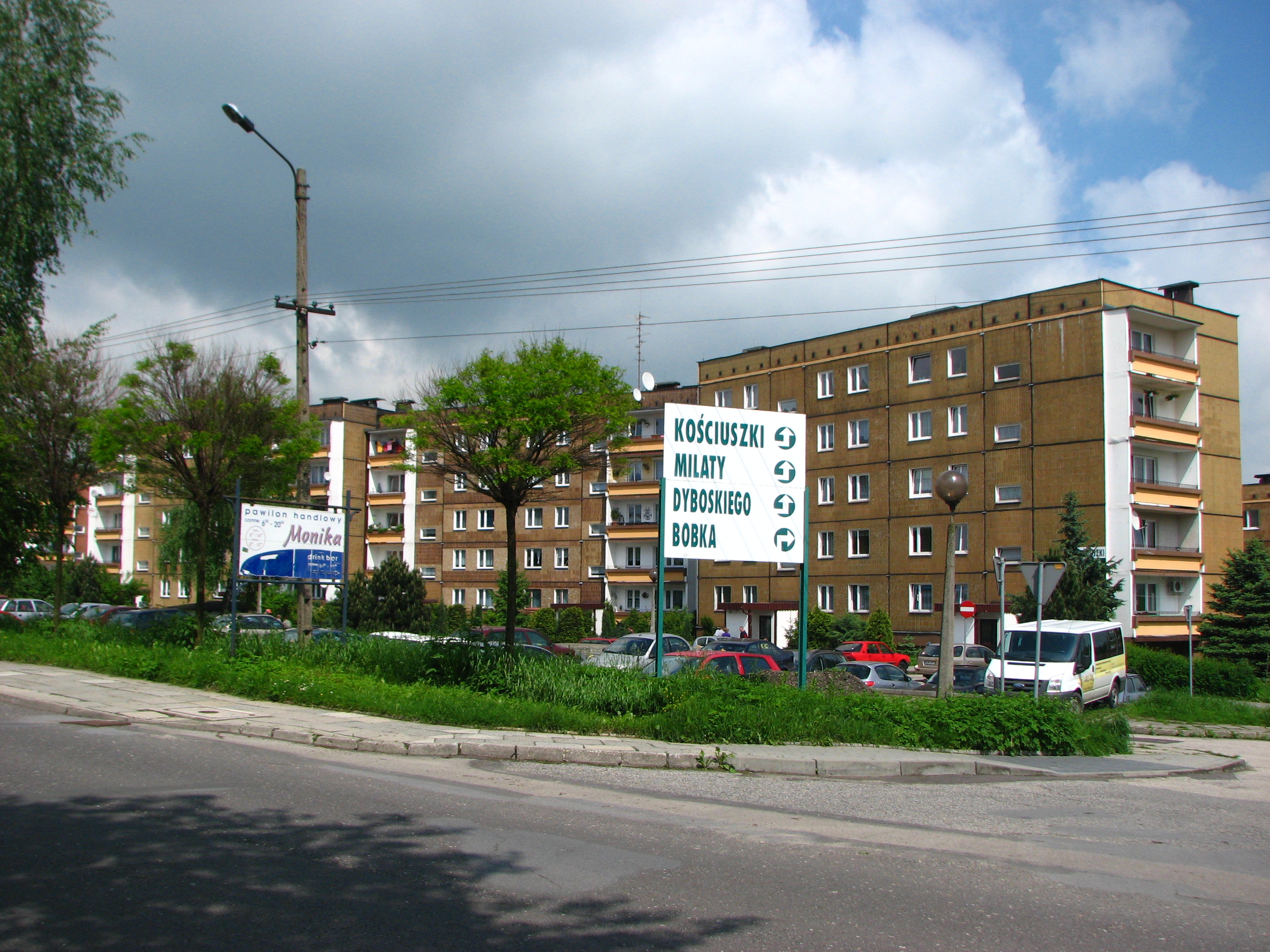
Bobrek West housing estate

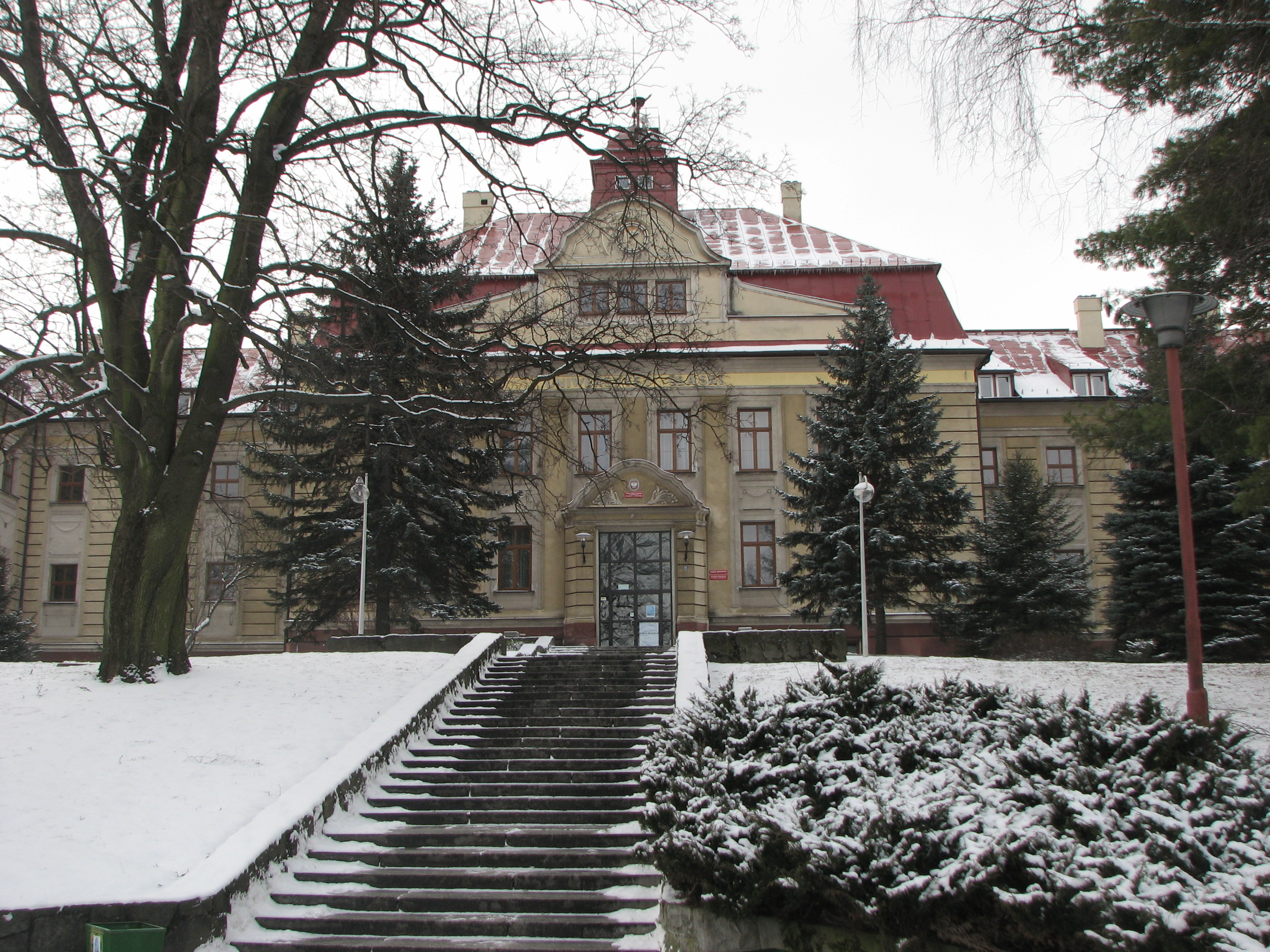
Former building of Polish teachers' seminar built in 1911
