= Medical Code of Ethics =

Type of document

Medical Code of Ethics is a document that establishes the ethical rules of behaviour of all healthcare professionals, such as registered medical practitioners, physicians, dental practitioners, psychiatrists, psychologists, defining the priorities of their professional work, showing the principles in the relations with patients, other physicians and the rest of community.

== Rules ==
The greatest ethical imperative for the physician is the welfare of the patient.

The physician should approach patients with consideration, respecting their personal dignity, right to intimacy and privacy.

The physician should perform all diagnostic, therapeutic and preventive procedures with due exactitude and devoting the necessary time.

The physician has the duty to maintain confidentiality. Information obtained in the course of physician's professional duties concerning the patient and his background is to be kept confidential. The death of the patient does not release the physician from the duty of maintaining confidentiality.

It is the duty of every physician to continually update and develop professional knowledge and skills as well as to share them with co-workers.

Medical code of ethics by country
Country	Original title	Lead agency	Publication
Brazil	Código de Ética Médica	Conselho Federal de Medicina	2009
Spain	Código de Deontología Médica. Guía de Ética Médica	Organización Médica Colegial de España	2011
Poland	Kodeks Etyki Lekarskiej (KEL)	Naczelna Izba Lekarska	2004
