= Matyldzin, Masovian Voivodeship =

Matyldzin
- Village
- Location within Poland
- Coordinates: 51°38′28″N 21°12′12″E
- Country: Poland
- Voivodeship: Masovian
- County: Białobrzegi
- Gmina: Stromiec

Matyldzin [maˈtɨld͡ʑin] is a village in the administrative district of Gmina Stromiec, within Białobrzegi County, Masovian Voivodeship, in east-central Poland.
