= Cecylówka =

- Village
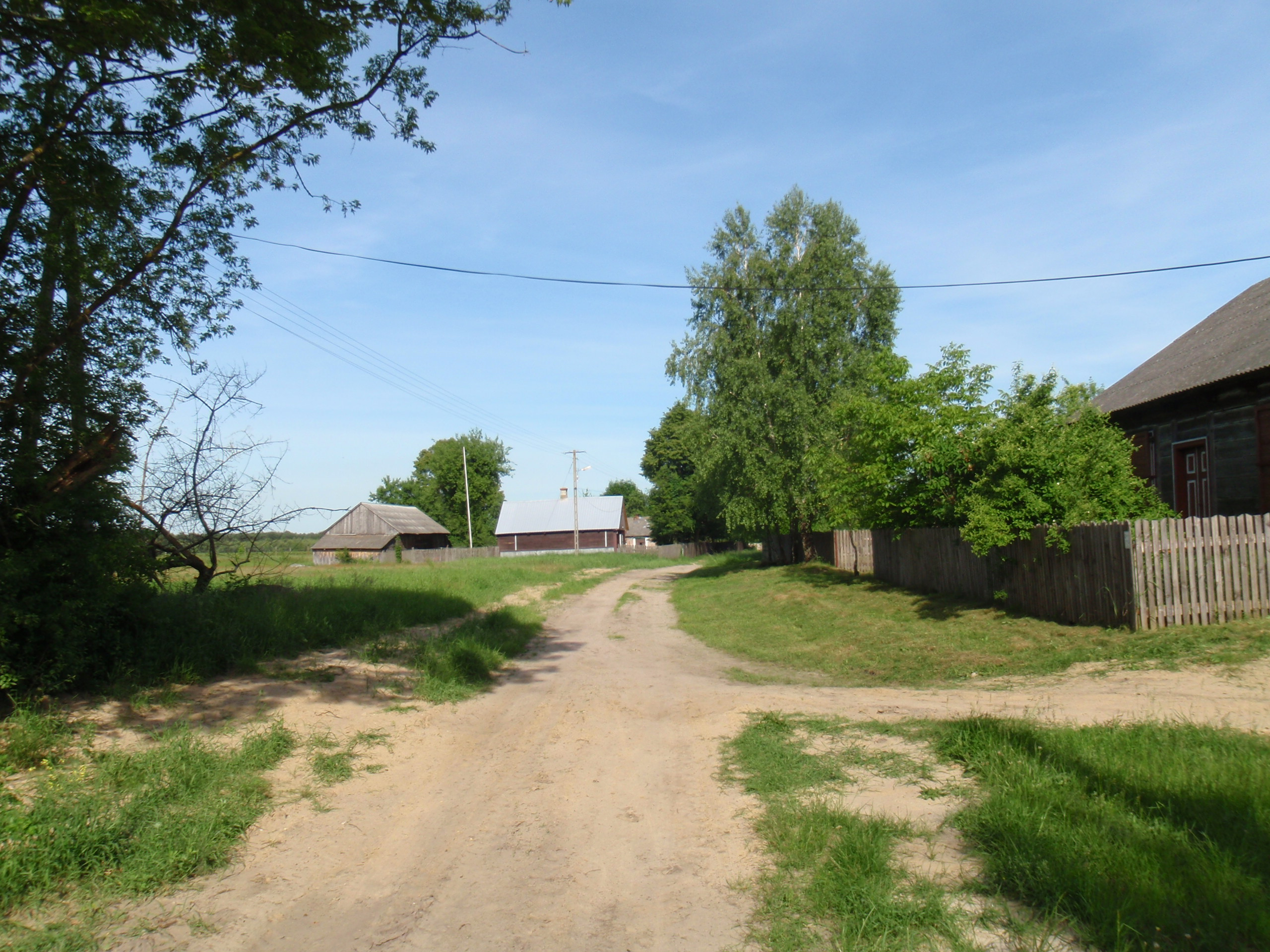

- Location within Poland
- Coordinates: 51°39′18″N 21°14′18″E
- Country: Poland
- Voivodeship: Masovian
- County: Kozienice
- Gmina: Głowaczów
- Time zone: UTC+1 (CET)
  - Summer (DST): UTC+2 (CEST)
- Vehicle registration: WKZ

Cecylówka [t͡sɛt͡sɨˈlufka] is a village in the administrative district of Gmina Głowaczów, within Kozienice County, Masovian Voivodeship, in east-central Poland.

On September 13, 1939, during the German invasion of Poland which started World War II, at least 54 inhabitants of Cecylówka were burned alive by Wehrmacht soldiers. Among the victims were at least a dozen Jews.
