= Bobrek, Masovian Voivodeship =

Bobrek
- Village
- Location within Poland
- Coordinates: 51°36′31″N 21°2′56″E
- Country: Poland
- Voivodeship: Masovian
- County: Białobrzegi
- Gmina: Stromiec
- Population: 280

Bobrek [ˈbɔbrɛk] is a village in the administrative district of Gmina Stromiec, within Białobrzegi County, Masovian Voivodeship, in east-central Poland.
