= Jacek Sasin =

Polish politician (born 1969)

Jacek Sasin MP
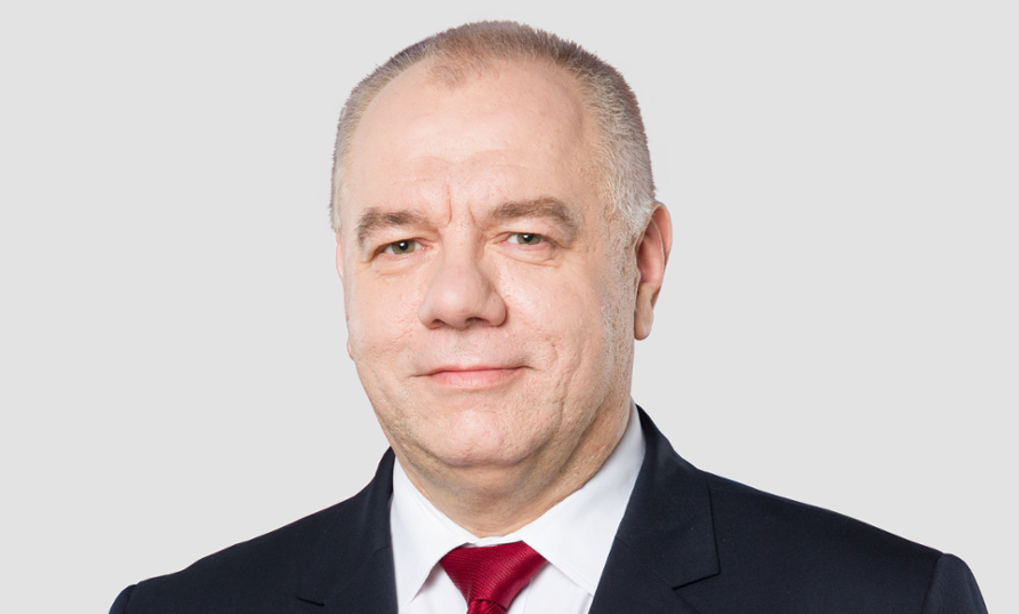
- Official portrait, 2019

Deputy Prime Minister of Poland
- In office 4 June 2019 – 21 June 2023
- President: Andrzej Duda
- Prime Minister: Mateusz Morawiecki
- Preceded by: Beata Szydło

Minister for State Assets
- In office 15 November 2019 – 27 November 2023

Voivode of Masovian Voivodeship
- In office 1 February 2007 – 29 November 2007
- Preceded by: Wojciech Dąbrowski
- Succeeded by: Jacek Kozłowski

Personal details
- Party: Law and Justice
- Education: Warsaw University; Kozminski University

Jacek Robert Sasin (born 6 November 1969 in Warsaw) is a Polish politician and former local government official.

== Biography ==
The son of Wojciech, a turner, and Irena, an office worker. He graduated from the 20th Secondary School named after Bolesław the Brave in Warsaw. In 2007 he assumed the role of Voivode of the Masovian Voivodeship. His career included stints as the deputy head of the Chancellery of the President and as secretary of state in the Chancellery of the Prime Minister.

In the local elections of 2010, he became a councilor of the Masovian Voivodeship Sejmik on behalf of PiS. He was also appointed mayor of the Praga-Northc district, but ultimately he did not take up this position.

In 2011, he became the candidate of Law and Justice in the parliamentary elections in the Warsaw district and obtained a parliamentary mandate, receiving 29,134 votes. In 2014, he was the candidate of Law and Justice in the 2014 Polish local elections for the office of the mayor of Warsaw, losing in the second round of voting to Hanna Gronkiewicz-Waltz.

Sasin had served deputy prime minister (from June 2019 to 2023) and the minister for state assets (from November 2019). In the Sejm, he was the chairman of the Public Finance Committee. Sasin has a degree in history from Warsaw University, completing a thesis under Andrzej Garlicki, and later studied at Kozminski University.

=== 2020 Polish election ===
On May 10, 2020, Sasin allocated PLN 68,896,820 for the Polish presidential election, which did not take place. The minister gave orders to print the ballot papers without any procedure or any legal basis, and ultimately lost them. Koalicja Obywatelska filed a motion to dismiss Sasin but this did not come to fruition.

=== 2023 Polish election ===
In the 2023 Polish parliamentary election, he was elected to the Sejm from the Białystok Constituency.
