= Kalisz Voivodeship (1975–1998) =

Former voivodeship of Poland

- Voivodeship of the Polish People's Republic and Republic of Poland
- 1975–1998
- The administrative subdivisions of Poland from 1975 to 1998, including the Kalisz Voivodeship.
- Capital: Kalisz
- Area
  - 1998: 6,512 km^{2} (2,514 sq mi)
- Population
  - 1975: 644 000
  - 1995: 722 000
  - 1998: 722 000
- History
  - Established: 1 June 1975
  - Disestablished: 31 December 1998
- Contained within
  - Country: Polish People's Republic (1975–1989); Poland (1989–1998)
Preceded by
| Poznań Voivodeship |
| Wrocław Voivodeship |
| Łódź Voivodeship |
Succeeded by
| Greater Poland Voivodeship |
| Lower Silesian Voivodeship |
| Łódź Voivodeship |

The Kalisz Voivodeship (Note: Polish: Województwo kaliskie) was a voivodeship (province) of the Polish People's Republic from 1975 to 1989, and the Republic of Poland from 1989 to 1998. Its capital was Kalisz, and it was centred on the Kalisz Region. It was established on 1 June 1975, from the parts of the Poznań, Wrocław, and Łódź Voivodeships, and existed until 31 December 1998, when it was partitioned between then-established Greater Poland, Lower Silesian, and Łódź Voivodeships.
