= Estonian Medical Association =

Organization based in Estonia

The Estonian Medical Association (EMA) (Estonian: Eesti Arstide Liit) is a professional association of medical doctors operating in Estonia. The association was established on 28 February 1921.

EMA also has an established Ethics committee consisting of 4 members. The ethics committee is responsible for producing guidelines on bioethics dealing with problems of medical ethics within the association.
