= Liw Castle =

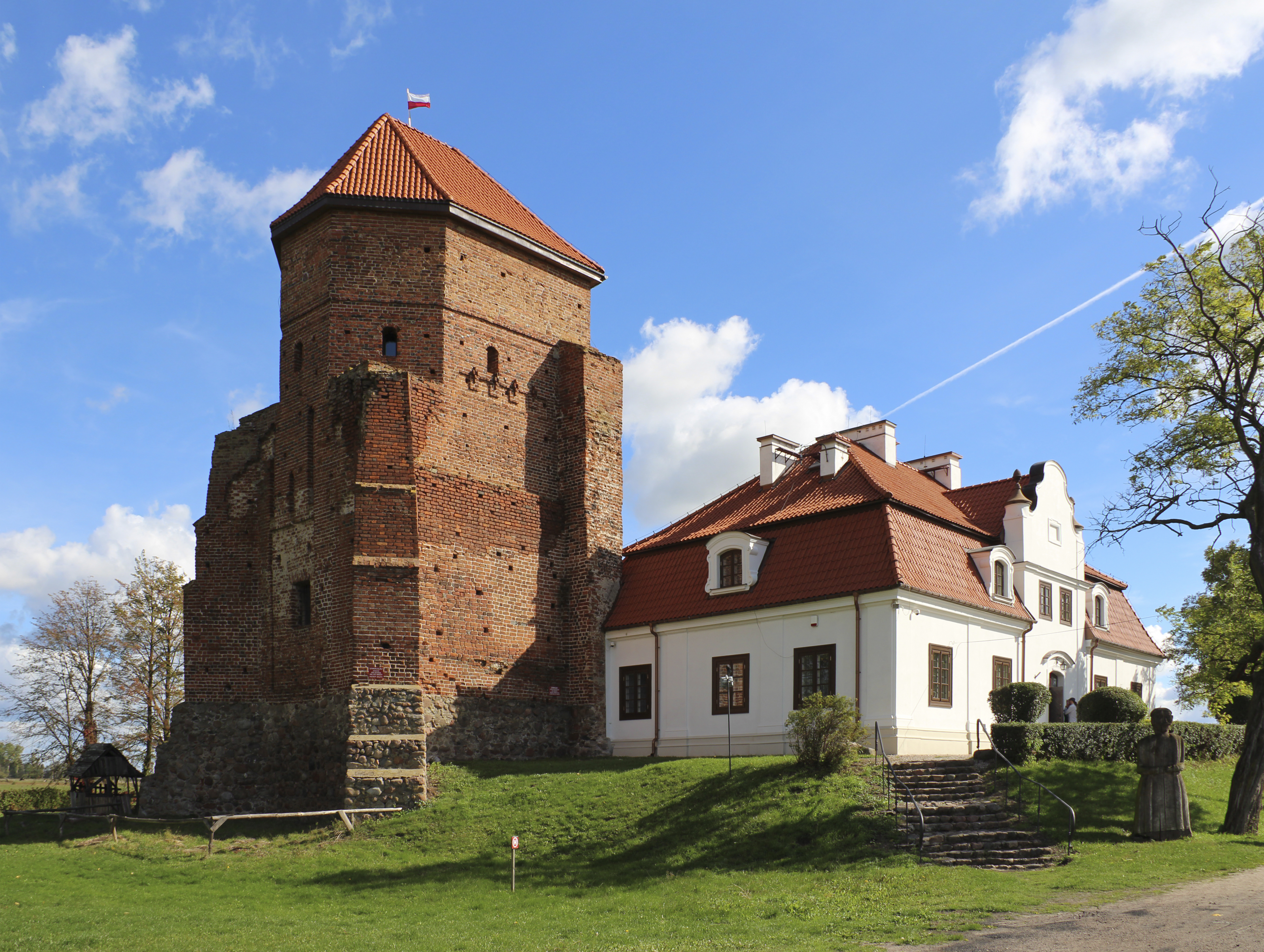
- Liw Castle

- Location of the Liw Castle in Poland
- 52°22′24″N 21°58′10″E
- Location: Liw, Masovian Voivodeship, Poland

History
- Built: Fifteenth century

Site notes
- Architect: Niclos
- Architectural style: Gothic

Liw Castle (Polish: Zamek w Liwie) - a ruin of a Gothic ducal castle raised in the fifteenth century as a guarding stronghold in the town of Liw. The castle is located in Liw (75 km north-east of Warsaw), Masovian Voivodeship; in Poland.

== History ==
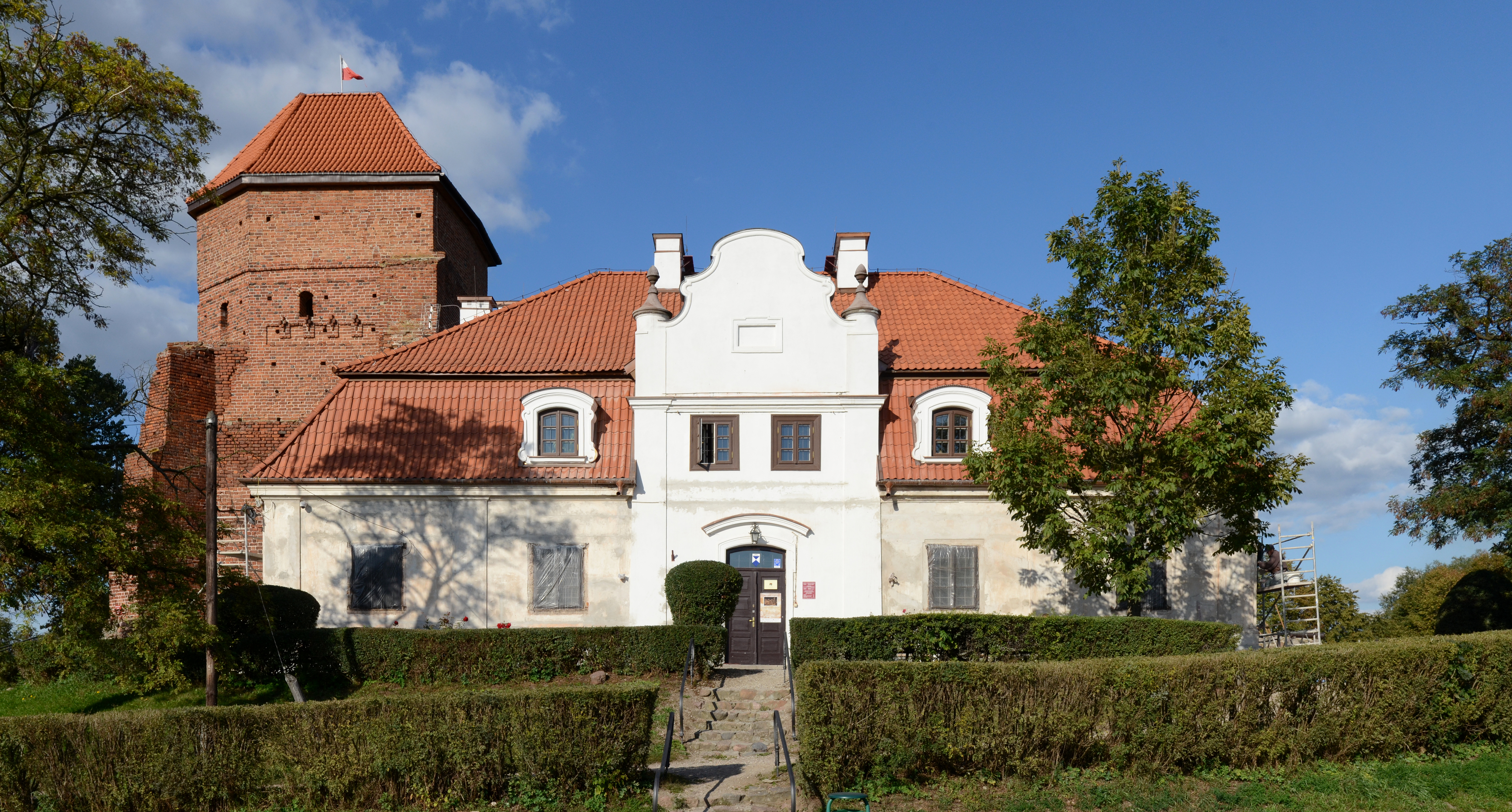
Manor house office - museum branch

The castle was raised in the first half of the fifteenth century by Masovian Duke Janusz I of Warsaw, the castle was built to secure the crossing of the river Liwiec. In 1549, Bona Sforza had personally ordered for the expansion of the castle. After the Deluge of the Swedes, all that was left of the castle were stones. In 1792, a manor house was built on top of the cinders, which was destroyed half a century later. After World War II the castle and manor house were both rebuilt and since 1963 they house a museum, with a collection of military items.

== See also ==
- Castles in Poland

== Bibliography ==
- Marek Żukow-Karczewski, Zamek w Liwie - gotycka twierdza książąt mazowieckich (Castle in Liw - a Gothic fortress of the dukes of Mazovia), "Aura" 12, 1995, p. 13–14.
