= Masovian Voivodeship =

Voivodeship of Poland

Masovian Voivodeship Województwo mazowieckie
- Voivodeship
- Flag Coat of arms Brandmark
- Motto: "Serce Polski" (Heart of Poland)
- Location within Poland

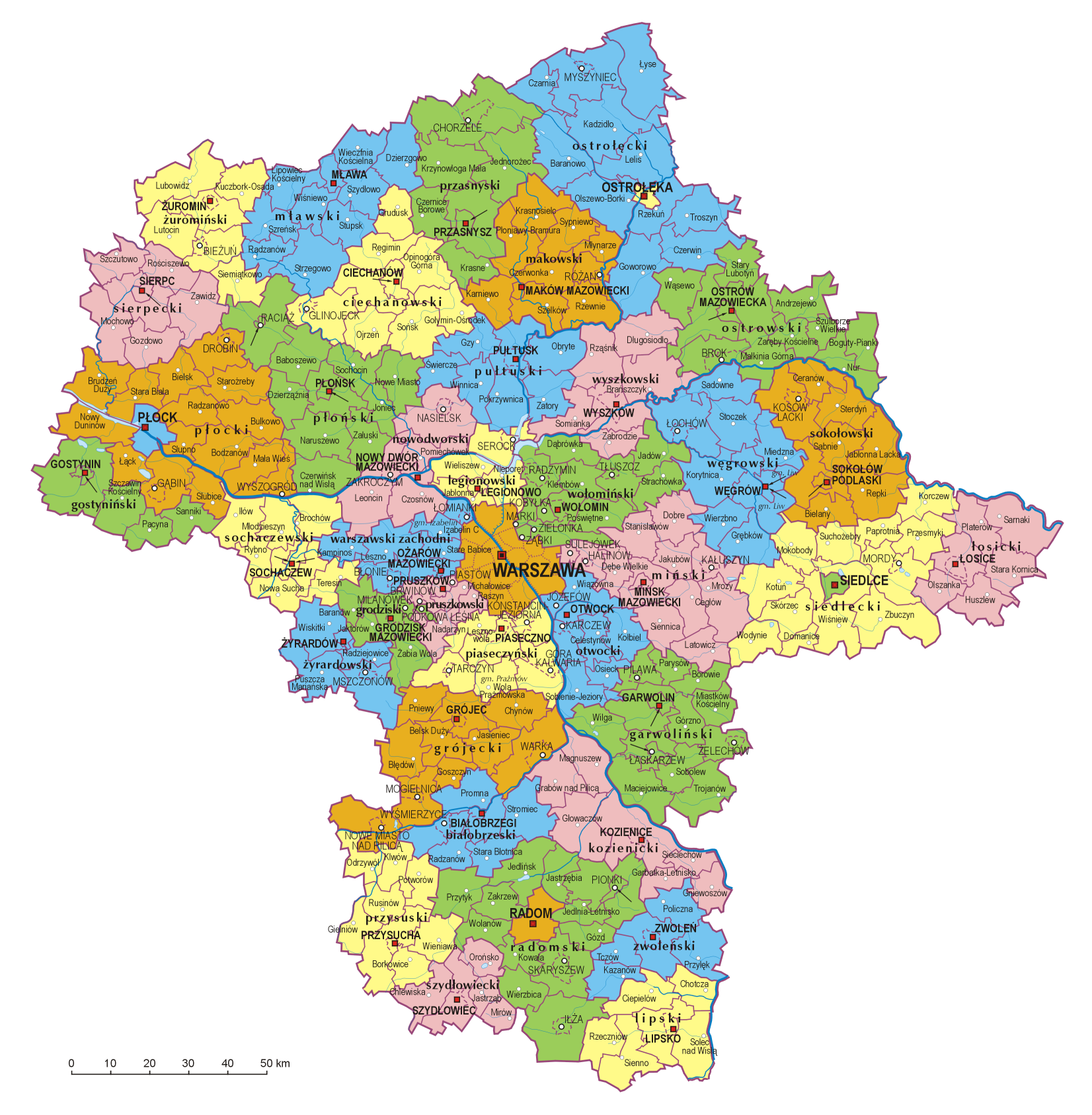
- Division into counties
- Coordinates (Warsaw): 52°13′N 21°0′E
- Country: Poland
- Capital: Warsaw
- Counties: 5 cities, 37 land counties *: Ostrołęka; Płock; Radom; Siedlce; Warsaw; Białobrzegi County; Ciechanów County; Garwolin County; Gostynin County; Grodzisk County; Grójec County; Kozienice County; Legionowo County; Lipsko County; Łosice County; Maków County; Mińsk County; Mława County; Nowy Dwór County; Ostrołęka County; Ostrów County; Otwock County; Piaseczno County; Płock County; Płońsk County; Pruszków County; Przasnysz County; Przysucha County; Pułtusk County; Radom County; Siedlce County; Sierpc County; Sochaczew County; Sokołów County; Szydłowiec County; Warsaw West County; Węgrów County; Wołomin County; Wyszków County; Żuromin County; Zwoleń County; Żyrardów County

Government
  - Body: Masovian Voivodeship executive board
  - Voivode: Mariusz Frankowski (PO)
  - Marshal: Adam Struzik (PSL)
  - EP: Masovian; Warsaw

Area
  - Total: 35,579 km^{2} (13,737 sq mi)

Population (2019)
  - Total: 5,411,446
  - Density: 151/km^{2} (390/sq mi)

GDP (nominal, 2024)
  - Total: €202.641 billion
  - Per capita: €37,000
- Time zone: UTC+1 (CET)
  - Summer (DST): UTC+2 (CEST)
- ISO 3166 code: PL-14
- Vehicle registration: W, A
- HDI (2023): 0.958 very high · 1st
- Website: www.mazovia.pl
- further divided into 314 gminas

Masovian Voivodeship (Polish: województwo mazowieckie, pronounced [vɔjɛˈvut͡stfɔ mazɔˈvjɛt͡skʲɛ]) (Note: Also spelled as Mazovian Voivodeship) is a voivodeship, or province, in east-central Poland, containing Poland's capital, Warsaw.

Masovian Voivodeship has an area of 35,579 square kilometres (13,737 sq mi) and had a 2019 population of 5,411,446, making it Poland's largest and most populous province. Its principal cities are Warsaw (1.783 million) in the center of the Warsaw metropolitan area, Radom (212,230) to the south, Płock (119,709) to the west, Siedlce (77,990) to the east, and Ostrołęka (52,071) to the north. It borders six other provinces: Warmian-Masurian to the north, Podlaskie to the northeast, Lublin to the southeast, Świętokrzyskie (Holy Cross) to the south, Łódź to the southwest, and Kuyavian–Pomeranian to the northwest.

The name of the province recalls the region's traditional name, Mazovia (in Polish Mazowsze, also spelled Masovia), with which it is roughly coterminous. However, the province's southern part, including Radom, historically belonged to Lesser Poland; while Łomża with environs, though historically part of Mazovia, is now part of Podlaskie Voivodeship.

Masovian Voivodeship is Poland's prime center of science, research, education, industry, and infrastructure. It has Poland's lowest unemployment rate and is a very high-income province. It is also popular with tourists due to the many historical monuments and its over 20% forested area of pine and oak. The province's Kampinos National Park is a UNESCO biosphere reserve.

== History ==
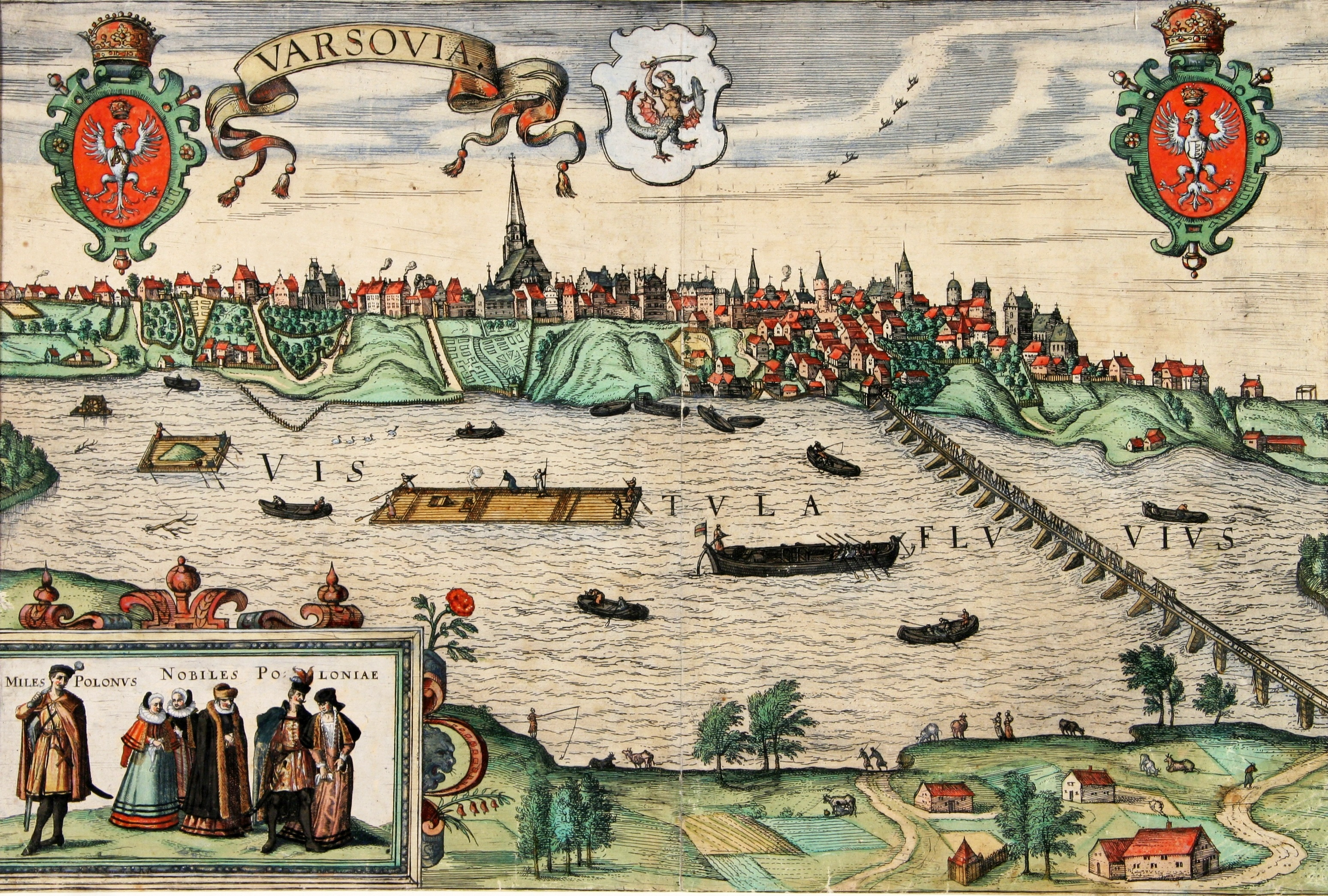
17th-century view of Warsaw

In the Early Middle Ages, the territory was inhabited by the Masovians, an old Polish tribe. It formed part of Poland since its establishment in the 10th century, with the then-regional capital Płock being the capital of Poland from 1079 to 1138. The Wzgórze Tumskie ("Cathedral Hill") in Płock with the Płock Castle and the Catholic Cathedral, seat of one of the oldest Polish dioceses, est. in 1075, which contains the sarcophagi of a number of Polish monarchs, is listed as a Historic Monument of Poland. Later, Płock, Warsaw and Czersk were medieval ducal seats of the Piast dynasty.

In 1505, Radom hosted the session of the Sejm (Polish Parliament), which enacted the Nihil novi act, and in the 16th century, Warsaw hosted several sessions of the Sejm, before King Sigismund III Vasa moved the Polish capital from Kraków to Warsaw in 1596.

Following the late-18th-century Partitions of Poland, the region witnessed several uprisings against foreign rule: the Kościuszko Uprising of 1794, the November Uprising of 1830–1831, and the January Uprising of 1863–1864.

In the interbellum, the region was part of reborn independent Poland. In 1920, the region was invaded by Soviet Russia, but Poland secured its freedom in the victorious Battle of Warsaw. The southern part of the current province was rapidly industrialized as part of the Central Industrial Region of Poland.

During World War II, it was occupied by Germany, with the occupiers committing their genocidal policies against Poles and Jews in the region, with expulsions, massacres of civilians and prisoners of war, including at Ciepielów, Śladów, Zakroczym, Ostrów Mazowiecka, Palmiry, Firlej, Skłoby, Nur, Ochota, Wola, and Lipniak-Majorat. Germany operated numerous prisons, forced labour camps, the Treblinka extermination camp, in which some 700,000–900,000 people were murdered, and several prisoner-of-war camps for Polish, Italian, French, Soviet, and Romanian prisoners of war.

Masovian Province was created on 1 January 1999, under the Polish local-government reforms adopted in 1998, out of the former provinces of Warsaw, Płock, Ciechanów, Ostrołęka, Siedlce, and Radom.

== Administrative divisions ==
Masovian Voivodeship is divided into 42 counties, including five city counties and 37 land counties. These are subdivided into 314 gminas (municipalities), which include 85 urban gminas.

The counties, shown on the numbered map, are described in the table below.

Map ref.	English and Polish names	Area		Population (2019)	Seat	Other towns	Total gminas
Map ref.	English and Polish names	(km^{2})	(sq mi)	Population (2019)	Seat	Other towns	Total gminas
City counties
1	Warsaw; Warszawa	517	200	1,783,321			1
(2)	Ostrołęka	29	11	52,071			1
(3)	Płock	88	34	119,709			1
(4)	Radom	112	43	212,230			1
(5)	Siedlce	32	12	77,990			1
Land counties
2	Ostrołęka County powiat ostrołęcki	2,099	810	88,717	Ostrołęka *	Myszyniec	11
3	Płock County powiat płocki	1,799	695	110,987	Płock *	Gąbin, Drobin, Wyszogród, Bodzanów, Staroźreby	15
4	Radom County powiat radomski	1,530	591	152,190	Radom *	Pionki, Iłża, Skaryszew, Jedlnia-Letnisko, Przytyk	13
5	Siedlce County powiat siedlecki	1,603	619	81,265	Siedlce *	Mordy	13
6	Żuromin County powiat żuromiński	805	311	38,688	Żuromin	Bieżuń, Lubowidz	6
7	Mława County powiat mławski	1,182	456	72,906	Mława		10
8	Przasnysz County powiat przasnyski	1,218	470	52,676	Przasnysz	Chorzele	7
9	Ciechanów County powiat ciechanowski	1,063	410	89,460	Ciechanów	Glinojeck	9
10	Sierpc County powiat sierpecki	853	329	52,077	Sierpc		7
11	Maków County powiat makowski	1,065	411	45,076	Maków Mazowiecki	Różan	10
12	Ostrów County powiat ostrowski	1,218	470	72,558	Ostrów Mazowiecka	Brok, Małkinia Górna	11
13	Płońsk County powiat płoński	1,384	534	87,183	Płońsk	Raciąż, Sochocin, Nowe Miasto, Czerwińsk nad Wisłą	12
14	Pułtusk County powiat pułtuski	829	320	51,862	Pułtusk		7
15	Wyszków County powiat wyszkowski	876	338	74,094	Wyszków		6
16	Gostynin County powiat gostyniński	616	238	45,060	Gostynin	Sanniki	5
17	Nowy Dwór County powiat nowodworski	692	267	79,256	Nowy Dwór Mazowiecki	Nasielsk, Zakroczym	6
18	Legionowo County powiat legionowski	390	151	117,751	Legionowo	Serock	5
19	Wołomin County powiat wołomiński	955	369	247,288	Wołomin	Ząbki, Marki, Kobyłka, Zielonka, Radzymin, Tłuszcz, Jadów	12
20	Węgrów County powiat węgrowski	1,219	471	66,037	Węgrów	Łochów	9
21	Sokołów County powiat sokołowski	1,131	437	53,992	Sokołów Podlaski	Kosów Lacki	9
22	Sochaczew County powiat sochaczewski	731	282	85,024	Sochaczew		8
23	Warsaw West County powiat warszawski zachodni	533	206	117,783	Ożarów Mazowiecki	Łomianki, Błonie	7
24	Mińsk County powiat miński	1,164	449	154,054	Mińsk Mazowiecki	Sulejówek, Halinów, Kałuszyn, Mrozy, Siennica, Cegłów, Dobre, Latowicz, Stanisławów	13
25	Łosice County powiat łosicki	772	298	30,895	Łosice		6
26	Żyrardów County powiat żyrardowski	533	206	75,787	Żyrardów	Mszczonów, Wiskitki	5
27	Grodzisk County powiat grodziski	367	142	94,962	Grodzisk Mazowiecki	Milanówek, Podkowa Leśna	6
28	Pruszków County powiat pruszkowski	246	95	165,039	Pruszków	Piastów, Brwinów	6
29	Piaseczno County powiat piaseczyński	621	240	186,460	Piaseczno	Konstancin-Jeziorna, Góra Kalwaria, Tarczyn	6
30	Otwock County powiat otwocki	615	237	124,241	Otwock	Józefów, Karczew, Osieck	8
31	Grójec County powiat grójecki	1,269	490	98,334	Grójec	Warka, Nowe Miasto nad Pilicą, Mogielnica	10
32	Garwolin County powiat garwoliński	1,284	496	108,909	Garwolin	Łaskarzew, Pilawa, Żelechów, Maciejowice	14
33	Białobrzegi County powiat białobrzeski	639	247	33,524	Białobrzegi	Wyśmierzyce	6
34	Kozienice County powiat kozienicki	917	354	60,253	Kozienice	Magnuszew, Głowaczów	7
35	Przysucha County powiat przysuski	801	309	41,721	Przysucha	Odrzywół, Gielniów	8
36	Zwoleń County powiat zwoleński	571	220	36,222	Zwoleń	Kazanów	5
37	Szydłowiec County powiat szydłowiecki	452	175	39,766	Szydłowiec	Jastrząb	5
38	Lipsko County powiat lipski	748	289	34,028	Lipsko	Solec nad Wisłą, Sienno, Ciepielów	6
* seat not part of the county

== Cities and towns ==
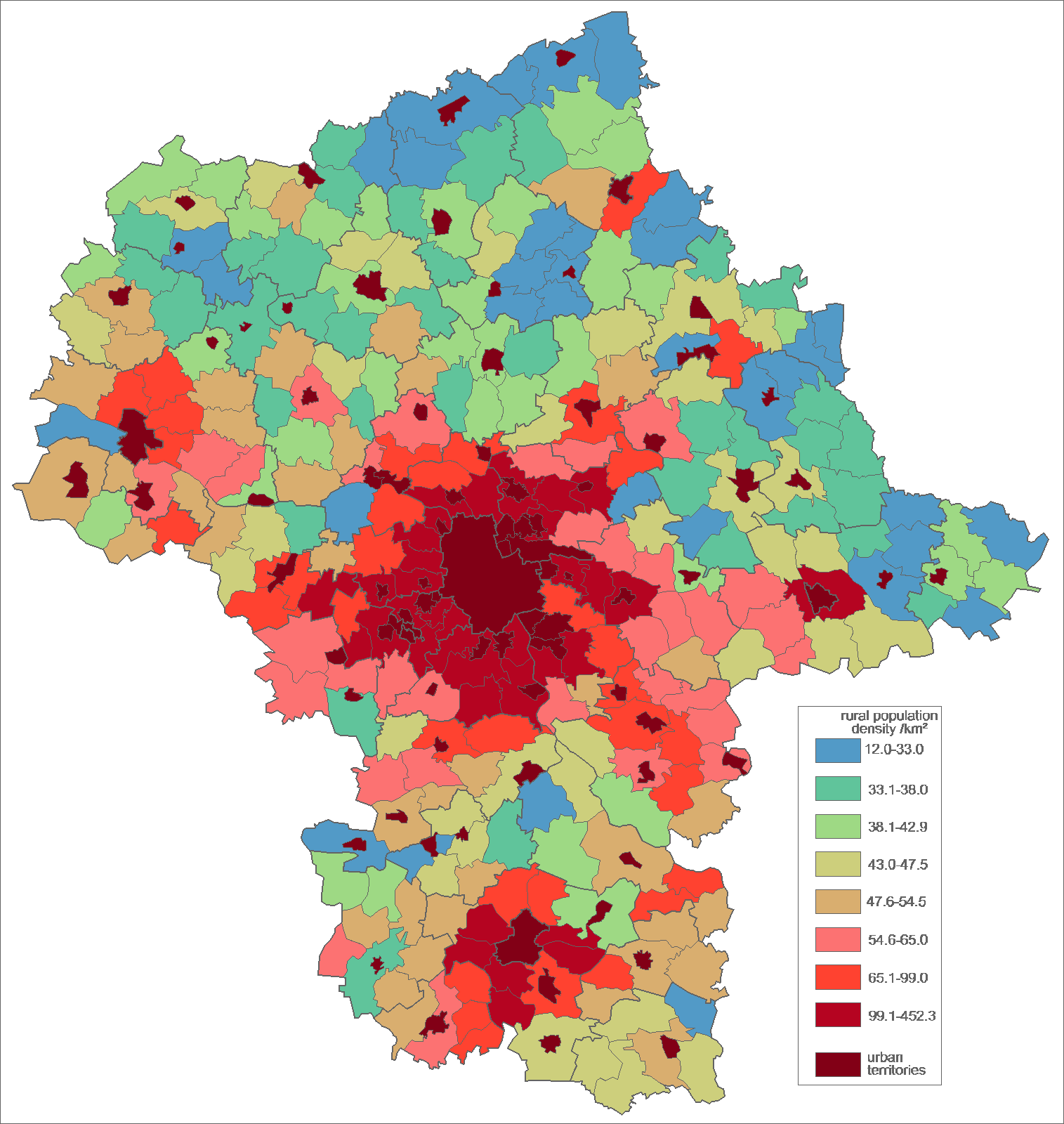
Population density by gmina (at 2007-01-01)

Historical population
Year	Pop.	±%
1988	4,997,845	—
2002	5,124,018	+2.5%
2011	5,268,660	+2.8%
2021	5,514,699	+4.7%

The voivodeship contains 10 cities and 78 towns. These are listed below in descending order of population (according to official figures for 2019):

Cities (governed by a city mayor or prezydent miasta):
1. Warsaw (1,783,321)
2. Radom (212,230)
3. Płock (119,709)
4. Siedlce (77,990)
5. Pruszków (62,076)
6. Legionowo (54,049)
7. Ostrołęka (52,071)
8. Otwock (44,827)
9. Ciechanów (44,118)
10. Żyrardów (39,896)

Towns:

1. Piaseczno (48,286)
2. Mińsk Mazowiecki (40,836)
3. Ząbki (37,219)
4. Wołomin (37,082)
5. Sochaczew (36,327)
6. Marki (34,679)
7. Grodzisk Mazowiecki (31,782)
8. Mława (31,241)
9. Nowy Dwór Mazowiecki (28,649)
10. Wyszków (26,905)
11. Kobyłka (24,096)
12. Piastów (22,619)
13. Ostrów Mazowiecka (22,489)
14. Płońsk (22,130)
15. Józefów (20,698)
16. Milanówek (20,698)
17. Sulejówek (19,766)
18. Pułtusk (19,432)
19. Sokołów Podlaski (18,946)
20. Gostynin (18,588)
21. Pionki (18,269)
22. Sierpc (17,994)
23. Zielonka (17,588)
24. Garwolin (17,501)
25. Przasnysz (17,264)
26. Kozienice (17,208)
27. Konstancin-Jeziorna (17,023)
28. Łomianki (17,022)
29. Grójec (16,745)
30. Brwinów (13,601)
31. Radzymin (13,005)
32. Węgrów (12,628)
33. Błonie (12,261)
34. Góra Kalwaria (12,040)
35. Warka (11,948)
36. Szydłowiec (11,736)
37. Ożarów Mazowiecki (11,719)
38. Karczew (9,856)
39. Maków Mazowiecki (9,776)
40. Żuromin (8,867)
41. Tłuszcz (8,156)
42. Nasielsk (7,702)
43. Zwoleń (7,698)
44. Łosice (7,049)
45. Białobrzegi (6,951)
46. Łochów (6,825)
47. Mszczonów (6,376)
48. Przysucha (5,818)
49. Lipsko (5,501)
50. Łaskarzew (4,840)
51. Iłża (4,733)
52. Pilawa (4,578)
53. Serock (4,506)
54. Raciąż (4,384)
55. Skaryszew (4,371)
56. Gąbin (4,125)
57. Tarczyn (4,116)
58. Żelechów (3,988)
59. Podkowa Leśna (3,851)
60. Nowe Miasto nad Pilicą (3,755)
61. Halinów (3,739)
62. Mrozy (3,574)
63. Myszyniec (3,408)
64. Zakroczym (3,196)
65. Chorzele (3,088)
66. Glinojeck (3,019)
67. Kałuszyn (2,899)
68. Drobin (2,872)
69. Różan (2,709)
70. Wyszogród (2,601)
71. Mogielnica (2,253)
72. Kosów Lacki (2,089)
73. Sanniki (1,961)
74. Brok (1,941)
75. Bieżuń (1,846)
76. Mordy (1,788)
77. Lubowidz (1,684)
78. Wyśmierzyce (885)
79. Jedlnia-Letnisko
80. Siennica
81. Cegłów
82. Sochocin
83. Dobre
84. Nowe Miasto
85. Wiskitki
86. Maciejowice
87. Latowicz
88. Magnuszew
89. Bodzanów
90. Osieck
91. Czerwińsk nad Wisłą
92. Jastrząb
93. Odrzywół
94. Solec nad Wisłą
95. Jadów
96. Sienno
97. Przytyk
98. Głowaczów
99. Gielniów
100. Ciepielów
101. Kazanów
102. Małkinia Górna
103. Stanisławów
104. Staroźreby
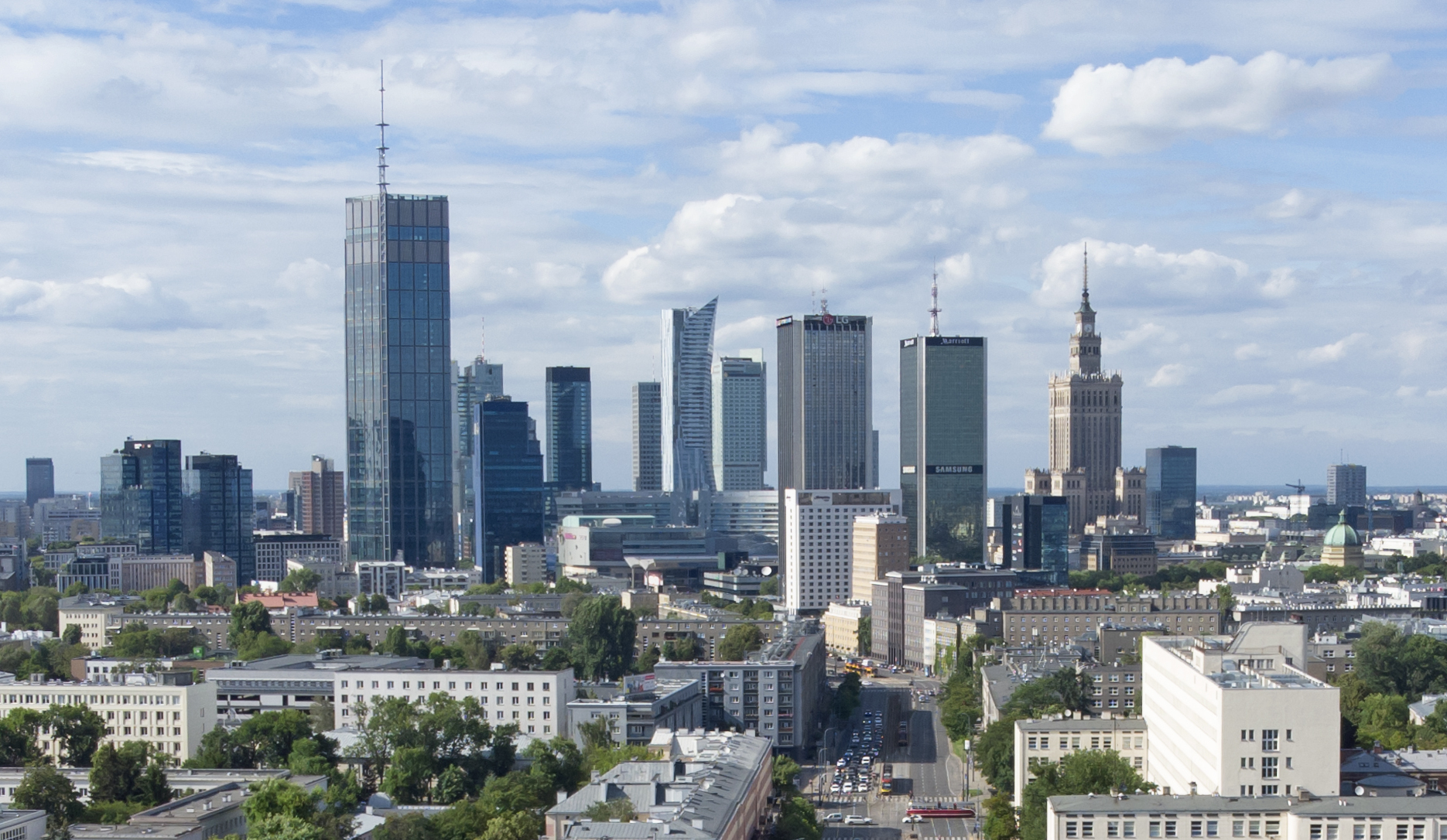
Warsaw is the capital of Poland.

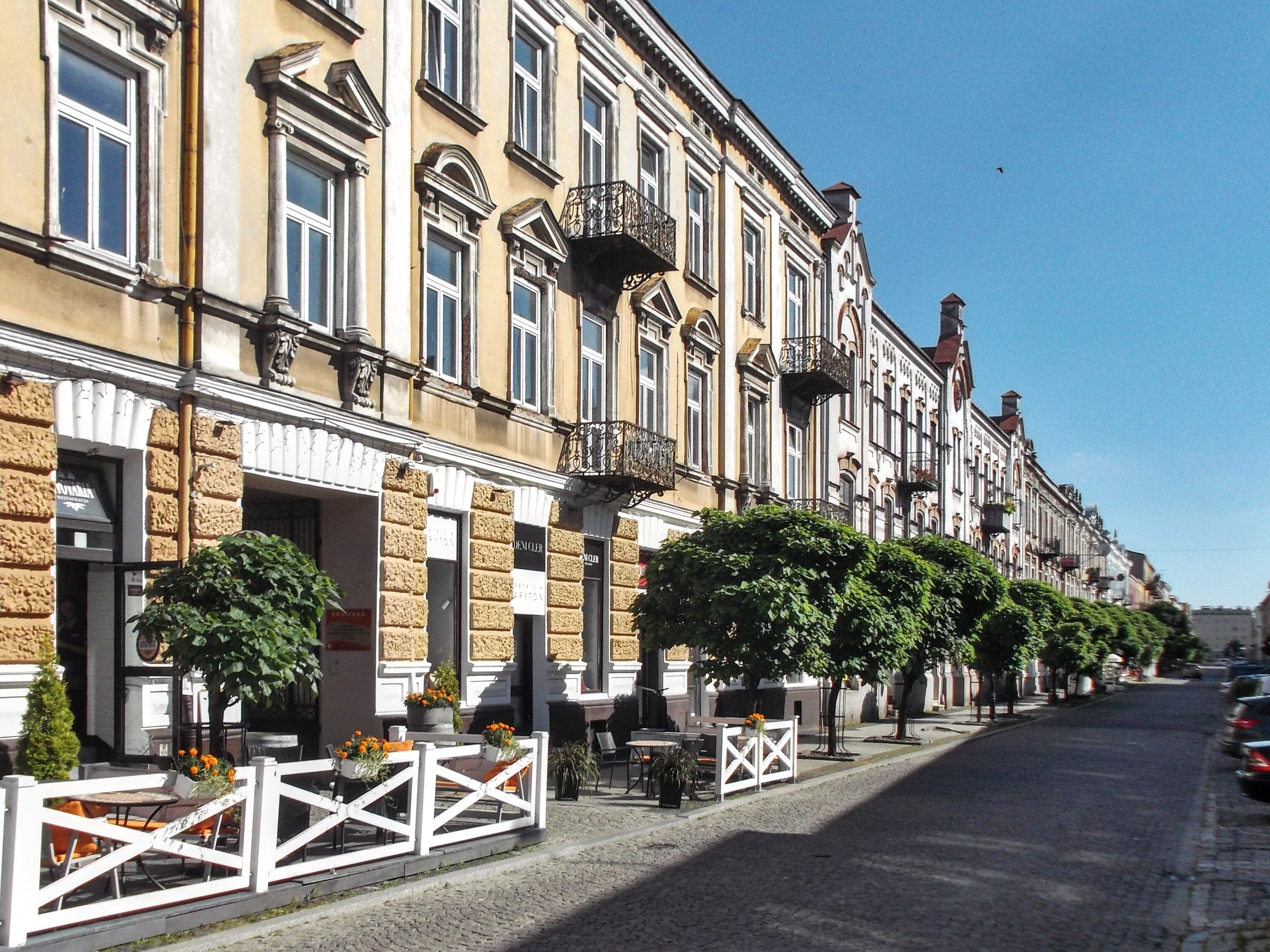
Radom is part of historical Lesser Poland.

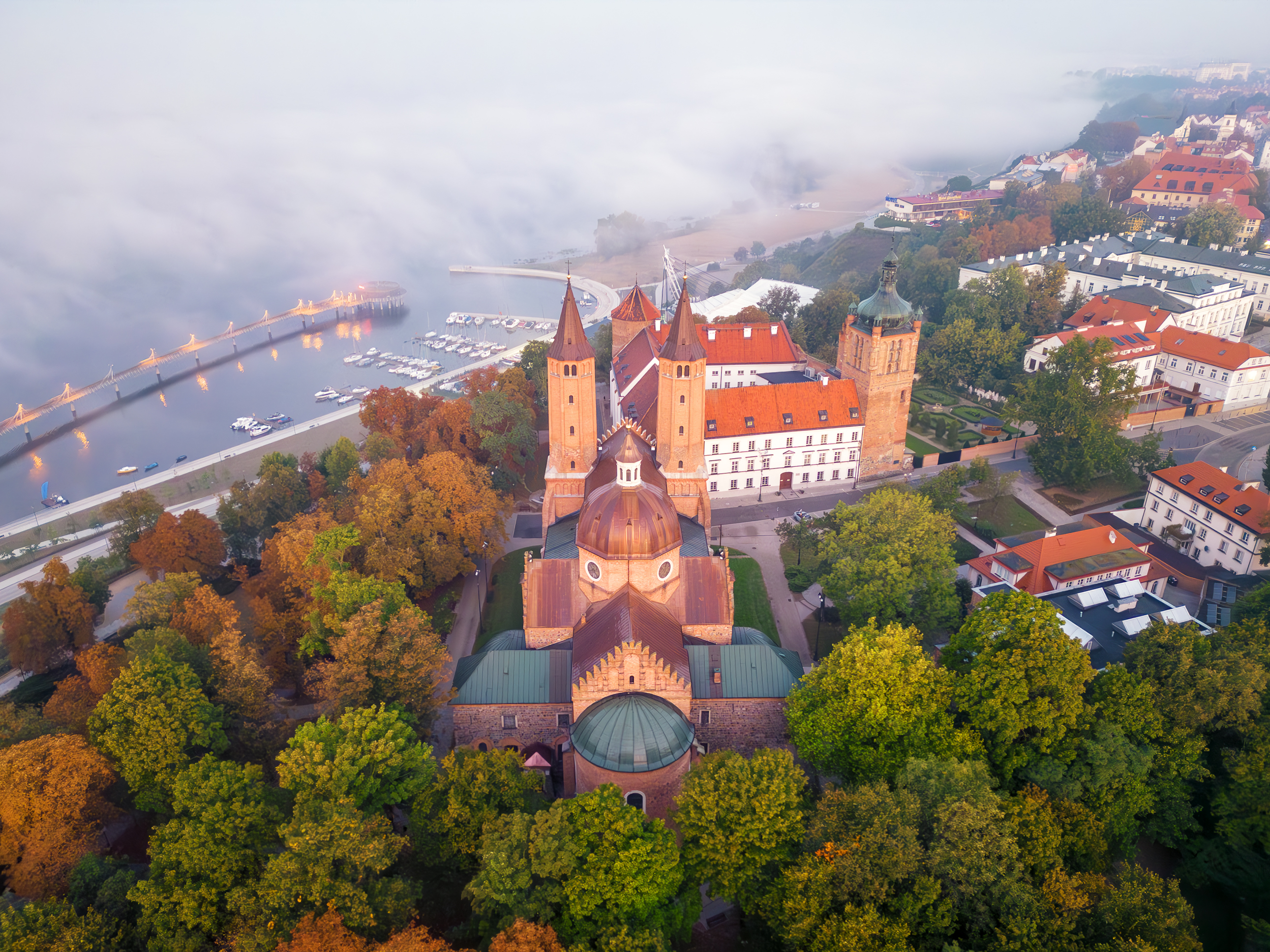
Płock is the historical capital of Masovia and former Polish capital.

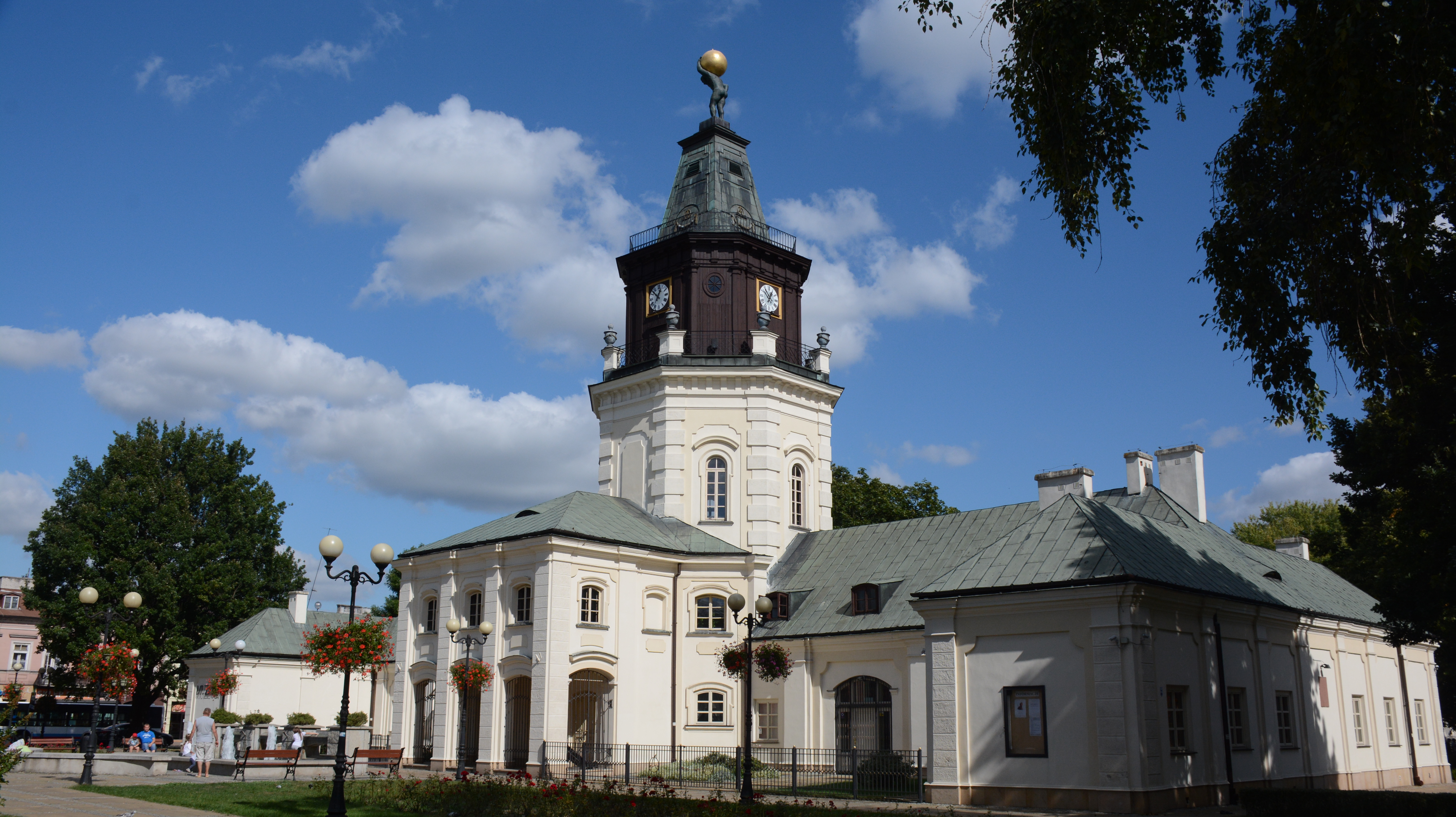
Siedlce is part of historical Lesser Poland.

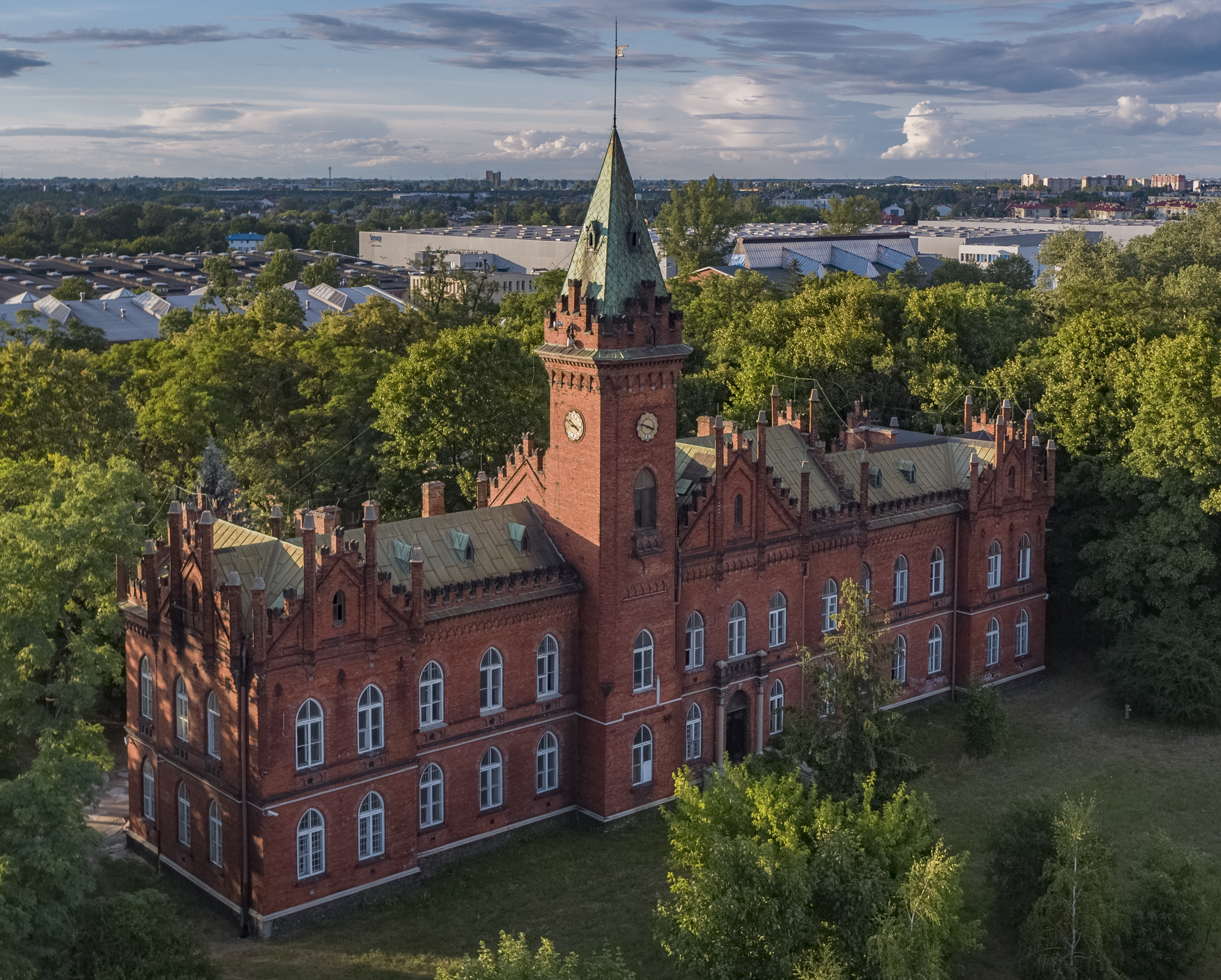
Pruszków is part of the Warsaw metropolitan area.

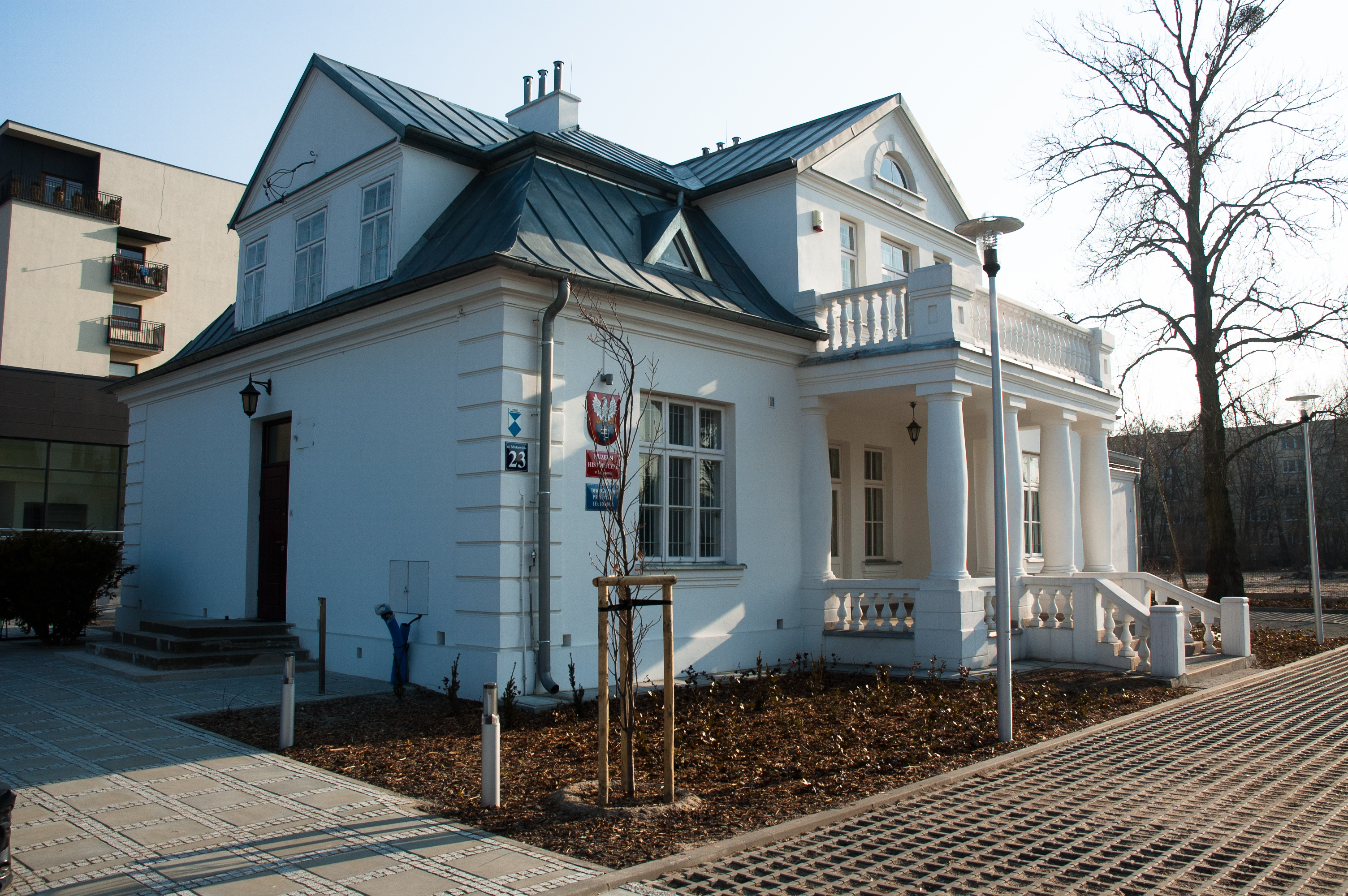
Legionowo is one of the youngest cities in the province.

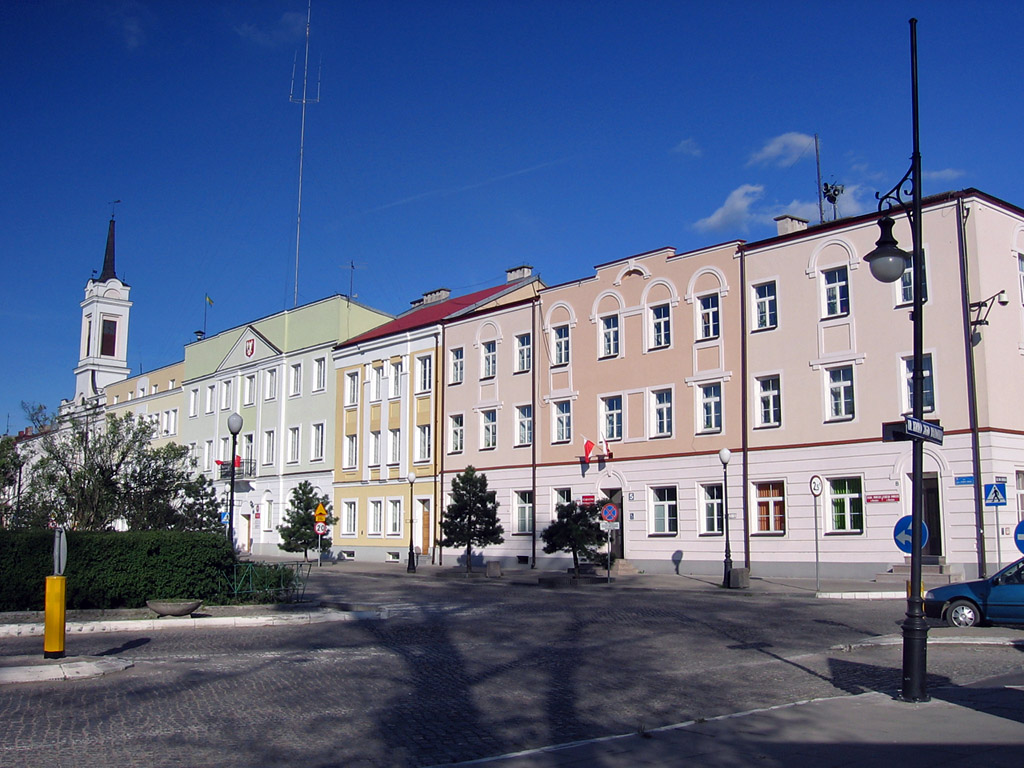
Ostrołęka is part of the ethnocultural region of Kurpie.

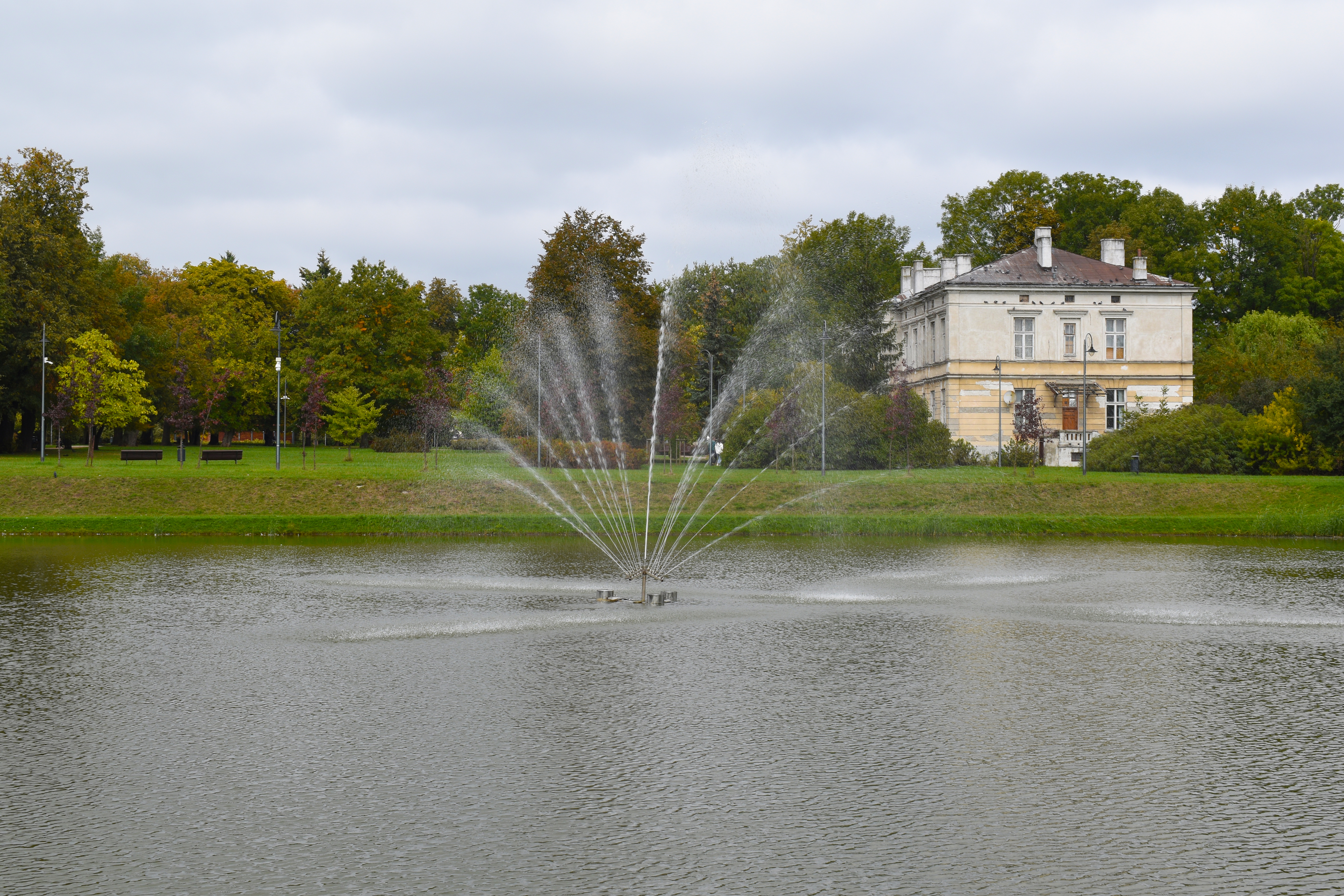
Piaseczno is part of the Warsaw metropolitan area, and a former royal town.

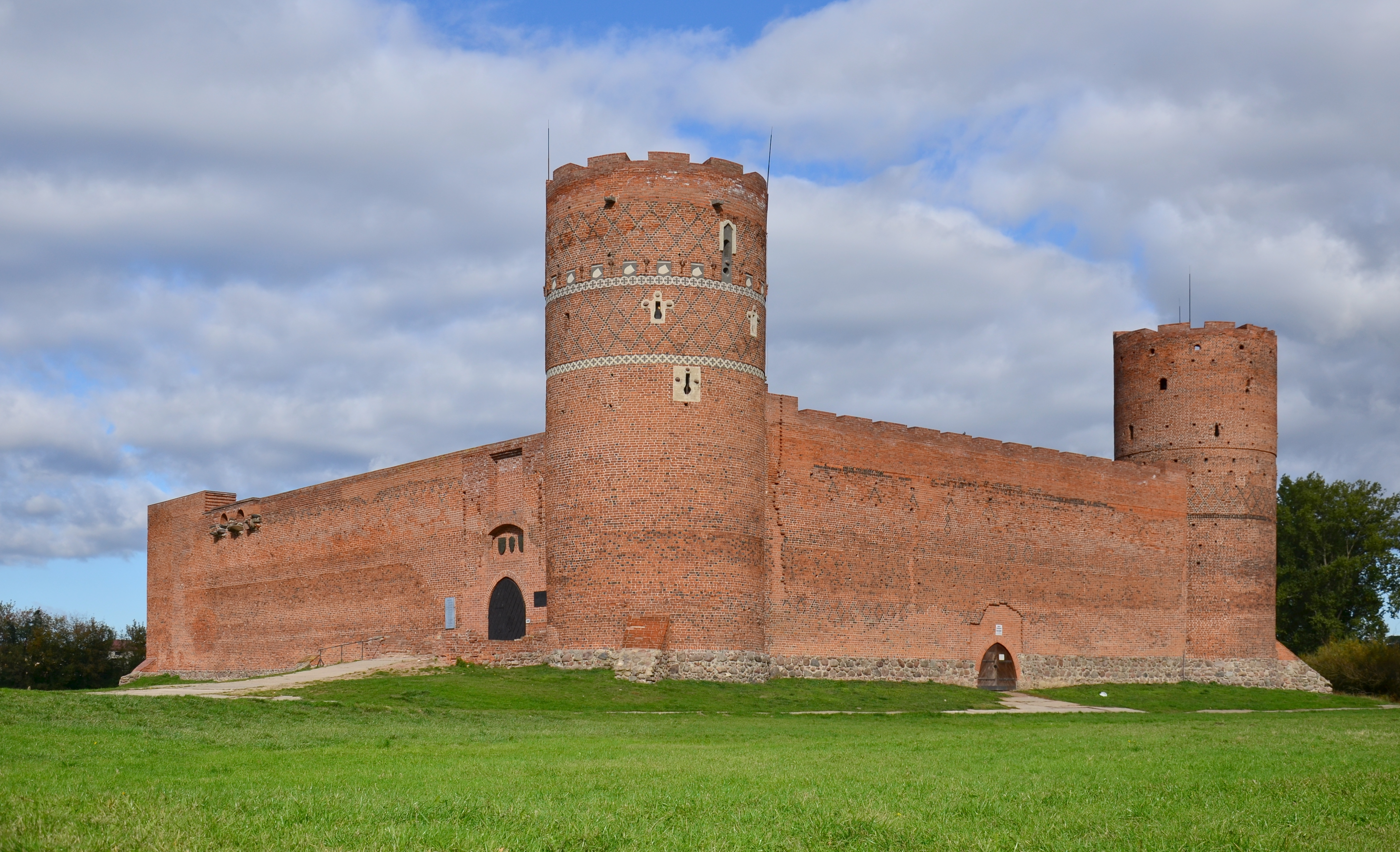
Ciechanów is a former royal city.

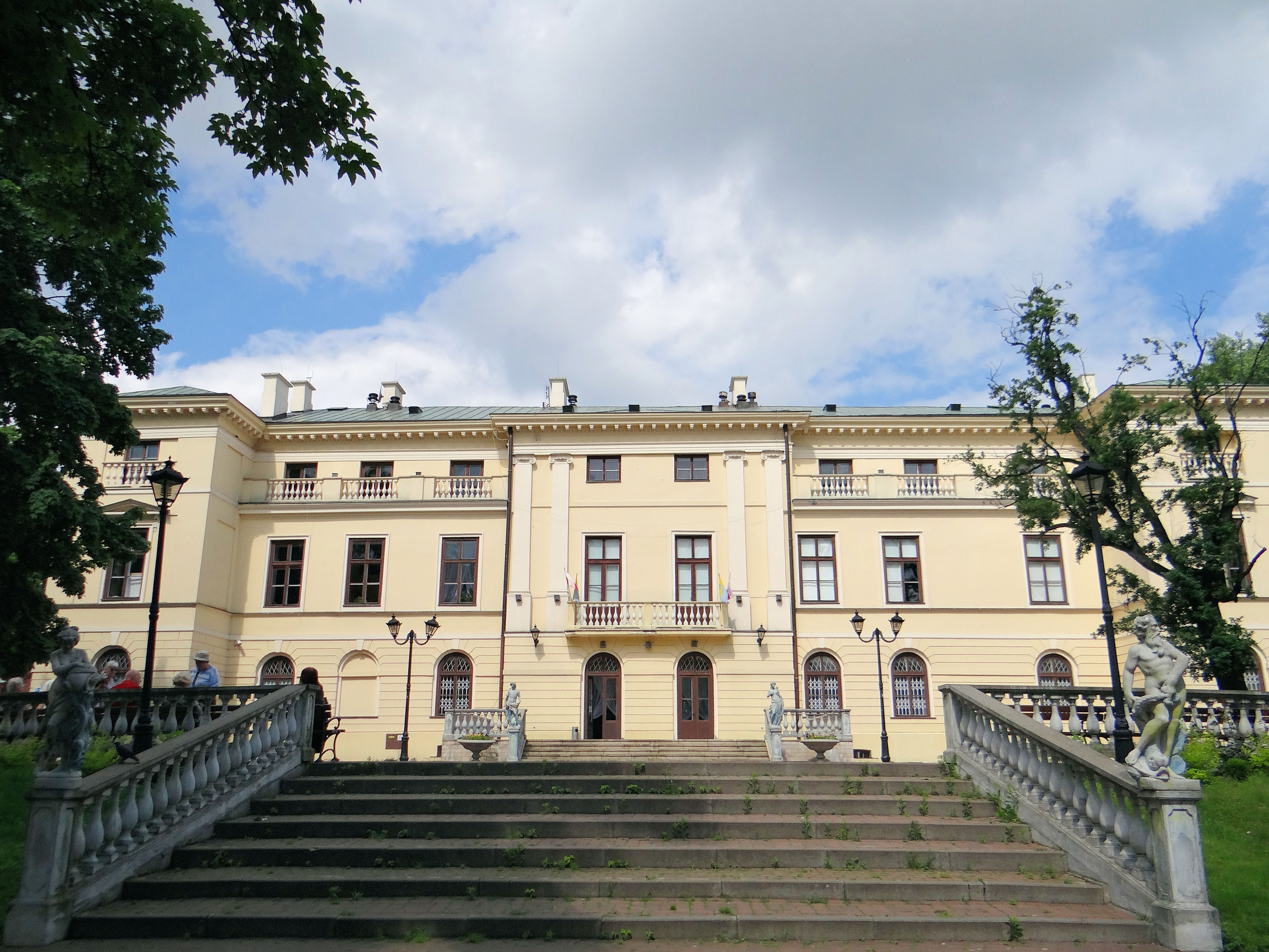
Mińsk Mazowiecki is part of the Warsaw metropolitan area.

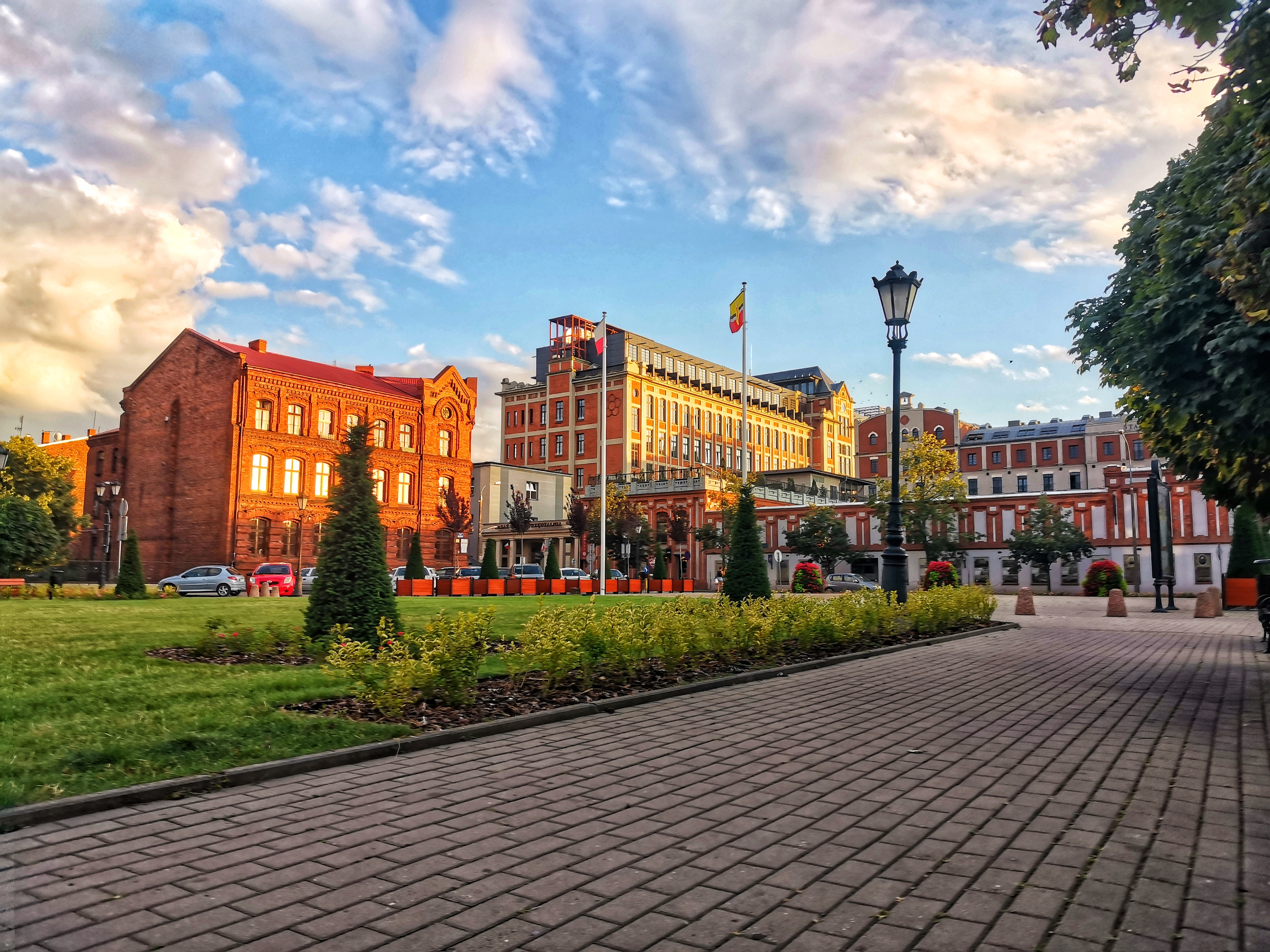
Żyrardów is one of the youngest cities in the voivodeship, established in 1830.

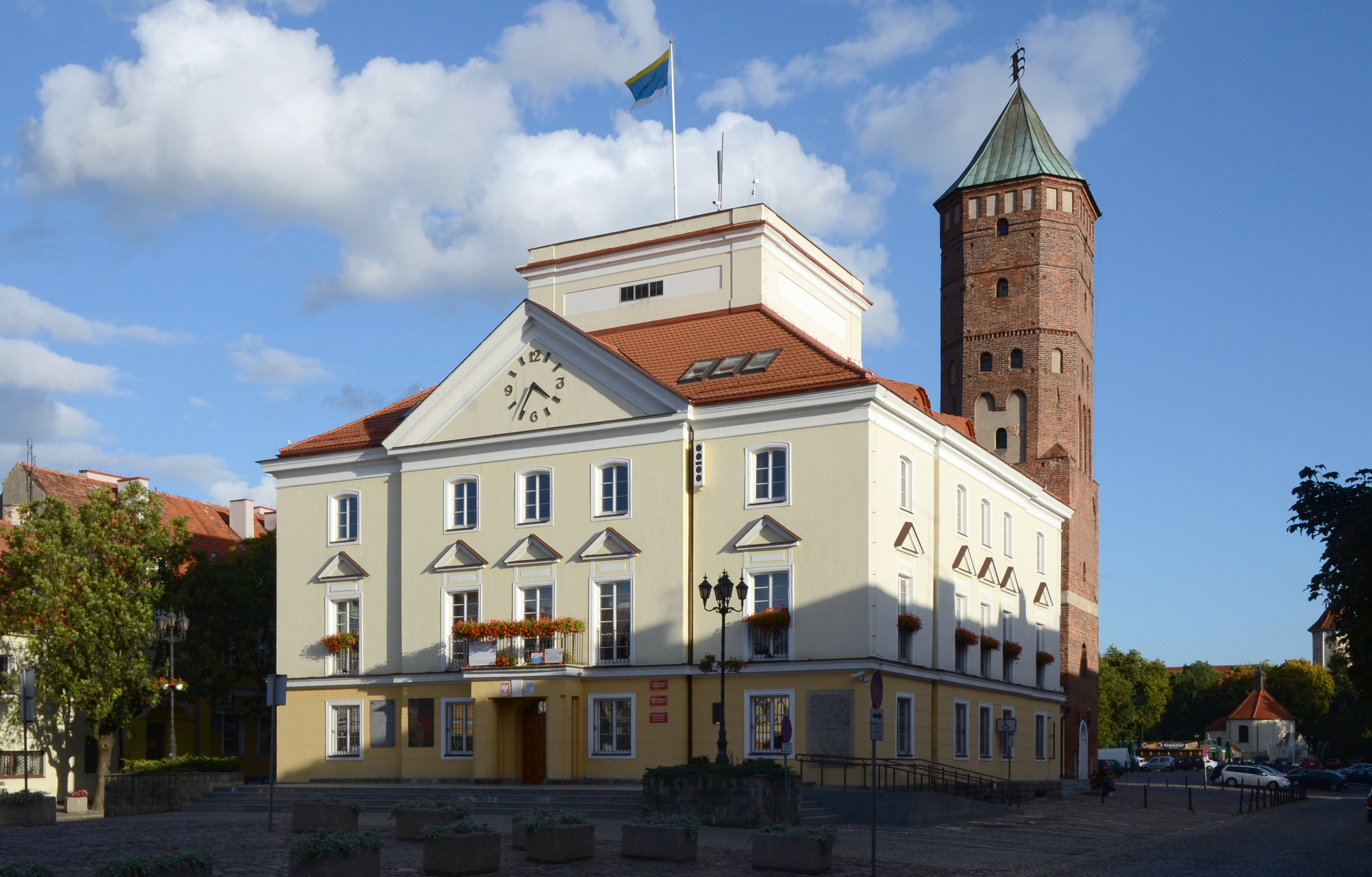
Pułtusk is one of the oldest towns in Poland.

== Politics ==
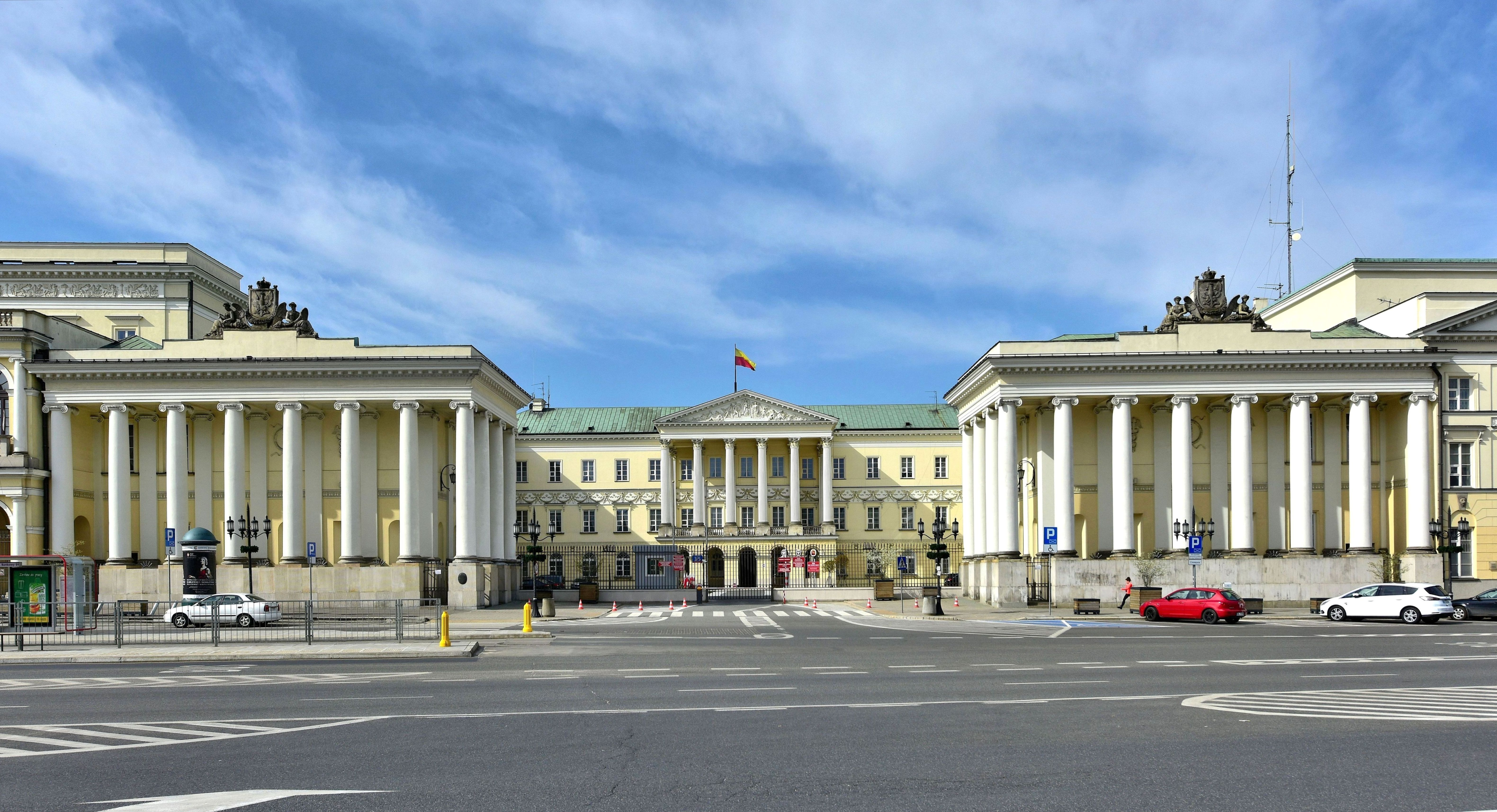
Voivodeship Office in Warsaw

The Masovian voivodeship's government is headed by the province's voivode (governor) who is appointed by the Polish Prime Minister. The voivode is then assisted in performing his duties by the voivodeship's marshal, who is the appointed speaker for the voivodeship's executive and is elected by the sejmik (provincial assembly). The current voivode of Masovia is Mariusz Frankowski.

The Sejmik of Masovia consists of 51 members.

=== Voivodes ===
Term start	Term end	Voivode	Party	Other high offices held
1 January 1999	20 October 2001	Antoni Pietkiewicz	AWS	Voivode of Kalisz (1990–1991)
21 October 2001	10 January 2006	Leszek Mizieliński	SLD	Masovian vice-marshal (1998–2001)
10 January 2006	17 January 2007	Tomasz Koziński	PiS	Mayor of Praga-Południe (2002–2006)
18 January 2007	1 February 2007	Wojciech Dąbrowski	PiS	Mayor of Żoliborz (2004–2006)
15 February 2007	29 November 2007	Jacek Sasin	PiS	Deputy PM (since 2019), MP (since 2011)
29 November 2007	8 December 2015	Jacek Kozłowski	PO	Vice-chairman of Poland 2050
8 December 2015	11 November 2019	Zdzisław Sipiera	PiS	Mayor of Wola (2005–2006), MP (2019–2023)
25 November 2019	31 March 2023	Konstanty Radziwiłł	PiS	Minister of Health (2015–2018), MP (2015–2019)
31 March 2023	13 December 2023	Tobiasz Bocheński	PiS	Łódź Voivode (2019–2023)
13 December 2023	Incumbent	Mariusz Frankowski	PO	Deputy director of strategy and regional development of the Masovian Vovoideship in the Marshal's Office (2007–2011) Warsaw city councilor (2018–2023),

== Protected areas ==
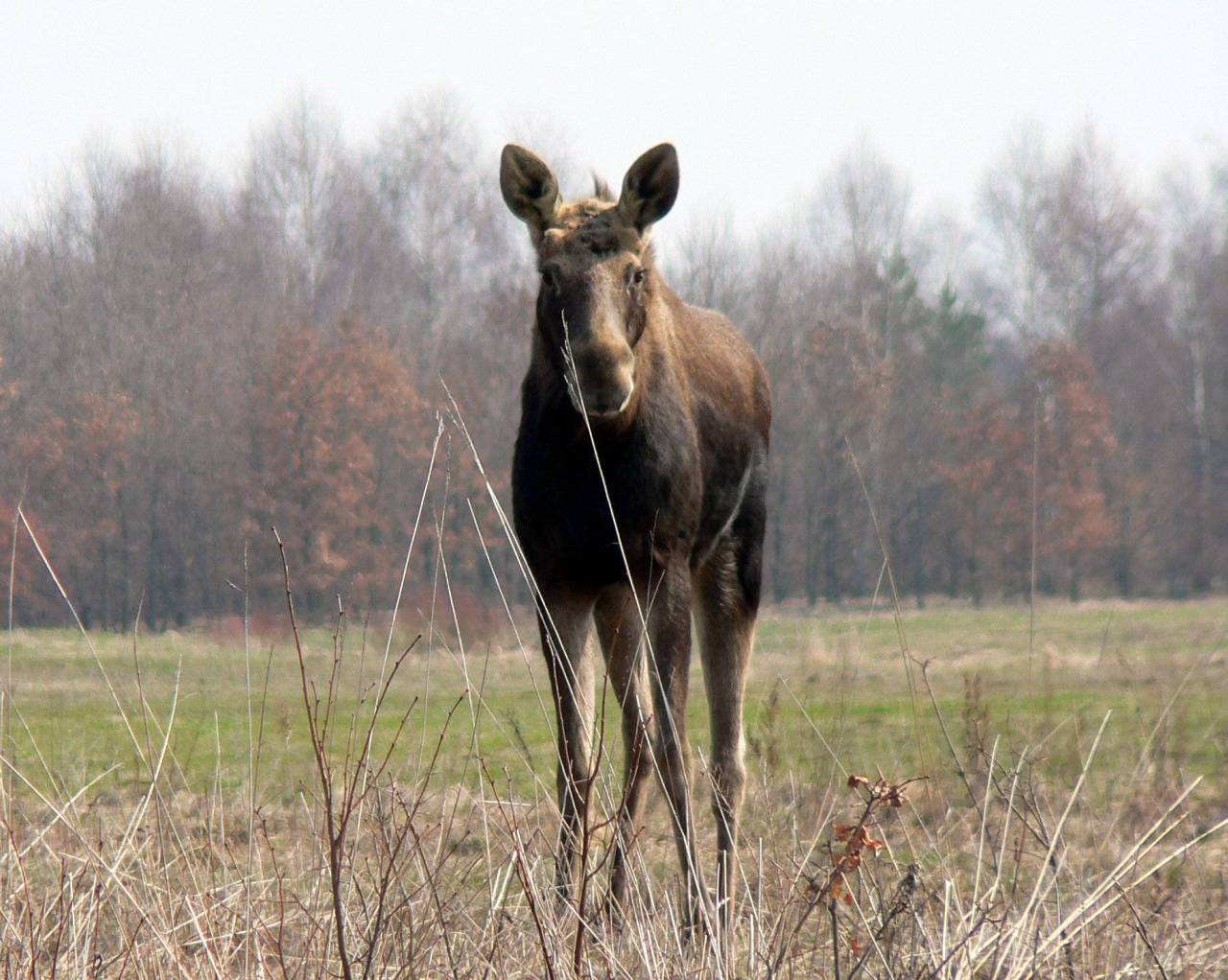
A moose in the Kampinos National Park (a UNESCO-designated biosphere reserve)

Protected areas include one National Park and nine Landscape parks. These are shown below.

- Kampinos National park (a UNESCO-designated biosphere reserve)
- Bolimów Landscape park (partly in Łódź Voivodeship)
- Brudzeń Landscape Park
- Bug Landscape Park
- Chojnów Landscape Park
- Górzno-Lidzbark Landscape Park (partly in Kuyavian-Pomeranian and Warmian-Masurian Voivodeships)
- Gostynin-Włocławek Landscape Park (partly in Kuyavian-Pomeranian Voivodeship)
- Kozienice Landscape Park
- Masovian Landscape Park
- Podlaskie Bug Gorge Landscape Park (partly in Lublin Voivodeship)

== Historical ==
=== Masovian Voivodeship (1526–1795) ===
Masovia Voivodeship, 1526–1795 (Polish: Województwo Mazowieckie) was an administrative region of the Kingdom of Poland, and of the Polish–Lithuanian Commonwealth, from the 15th century until the partitions of the Polish-Lithuanian Commonwealth (1795). Together with Płock and Rawa Voivodeships, it formed the province (prowincja) of Masovia.

=== Masovian Voivodeship (1816–1837) ===
Masovian Voivodeship was one of the voivodeships of Congress Poland. It was formed from the Warsaw Department and transformed into the Masovia Governorate.

== Transport ==
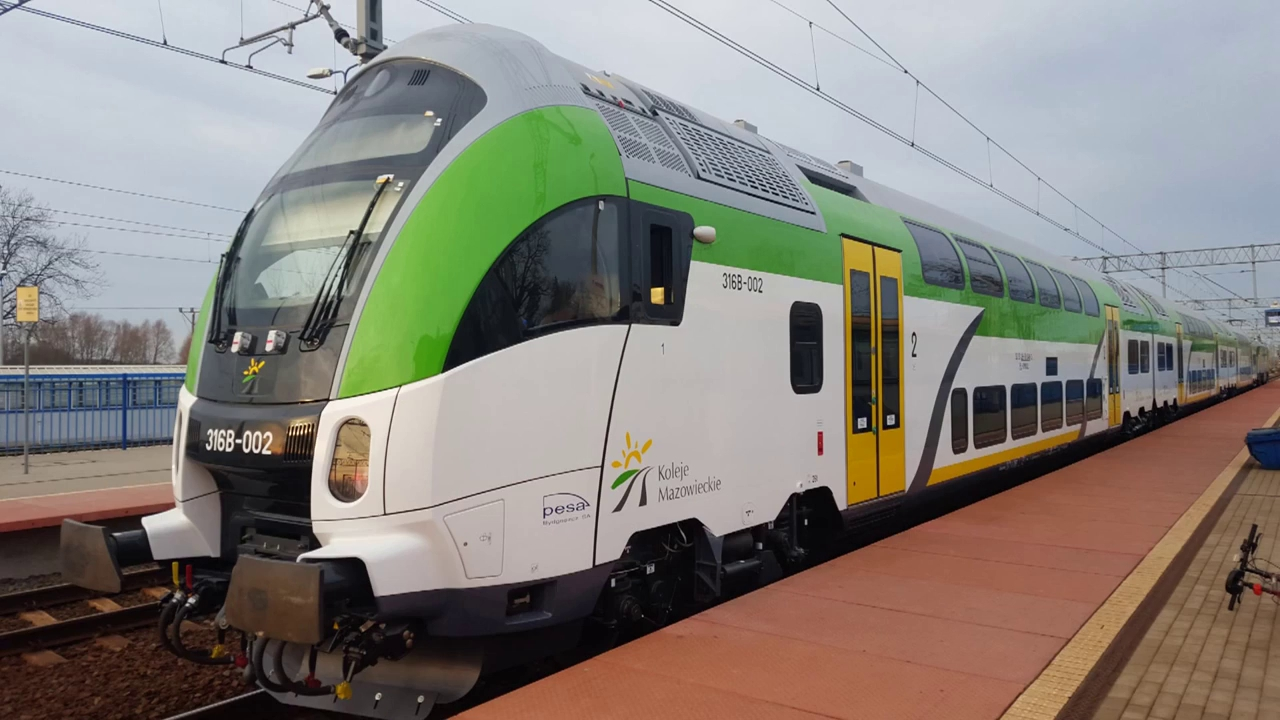
Masovian Railways

Three major international road routes pass through the voivodeship: Cork–Berlin–Poznań–Warszawa–Minsk–Moscow–Omsk (European route E30), Prague–Wrocław–Warsaw–Białystok–Helsinki (E67) and Pskov–Gdańsk–Warsaw–Kraków–Budapest (E77).

Currently, there are various stretches of highways in the area, with the A2 highway connecting the region, and therefore the capital city, with the rest of Europe. The highway passes directly through the voivodeship from west to east, connecting it with Belarus and Germany. However, the A2 is yet to be built east of Warsaw to connect Poland with Belarus. The S7 expressway runs through Poland from the north to the south passing through Warsaw, the S8 connects Warsaw with Białystok, in the neighboring north-eastern province, also forming part of the Via Baltica which heads on to Lithuania, and to Wrocław in the south-west, and the S17 being built to connect Warsaw with Lublin in the south-east and on to Ukraine.

The two main railway carriers operating in the region are the regional Masovian Railways and nationwide PKP Intercity. Three of ten busiest railway stations of Poland are located in the voivodeship: Warszawa Centralna, Warszawa Wschodnia, Warszawa Zachodnia.

The main international airport in the region is Warsaw Frederic Chopin Airport.

== Economy ==
Masovian Voivodeship is the wealthiest province in Poland. The gross domestic product (GDP) of the province was PLN 596 billion in 2021, accounting for 22.8% of the Polish economic output. GDP per capita adjusted for purchasing power was around PLN123,000 in the same year.

=== Unemployment ===
The unemployment rate stood at 4.8% in 2017 and was higher than the national and the European average.

Year	2006	2007	2008	2009	2010	2011	2012	2013	2014	2015	2016	2017
unemployment rate (in %)	12.3	9.1	6.0	6.0	7.4	7.9	8.0	8.0	7.2	6.4	5.5	4.8

== Sights and tourism ==
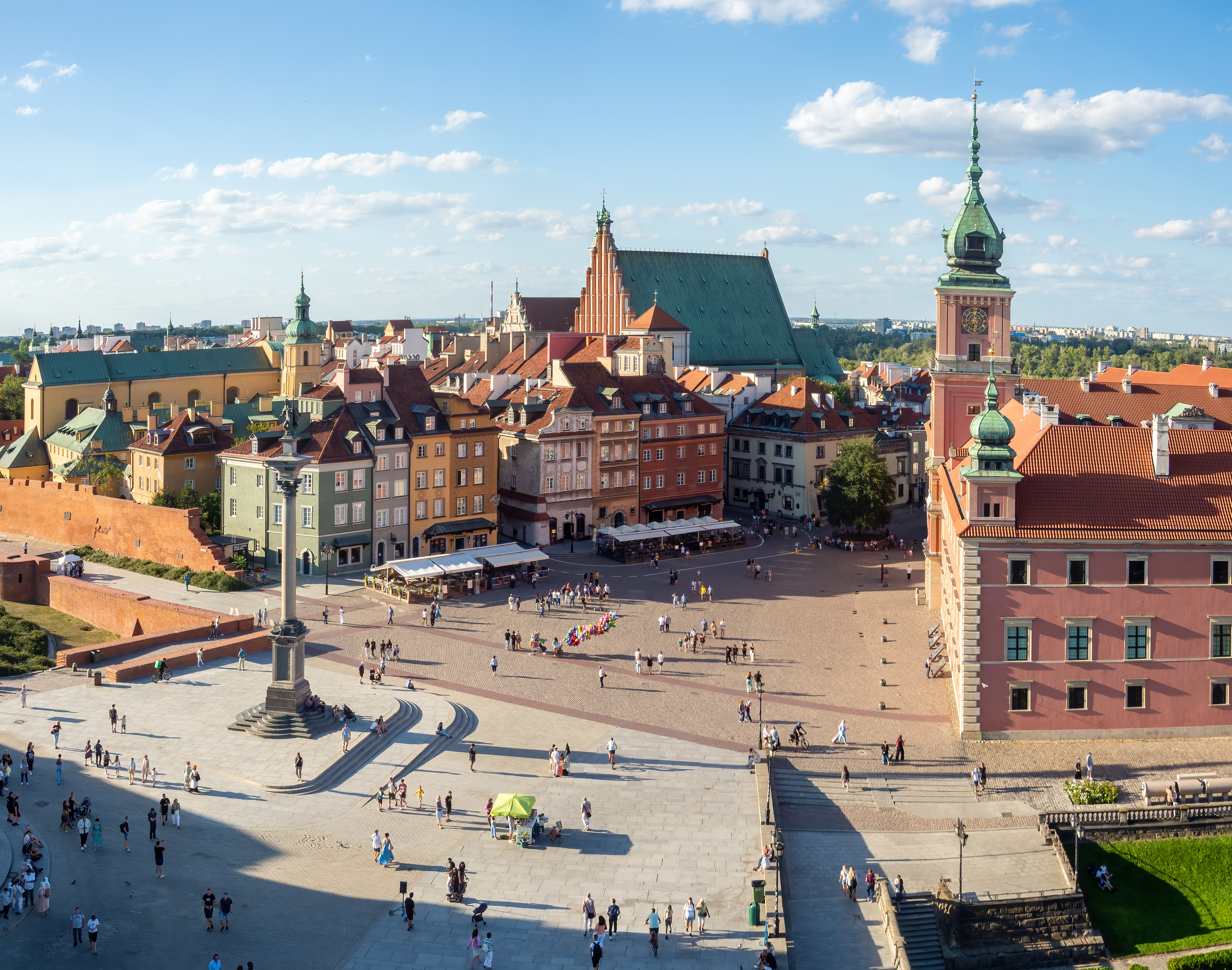
Warsaw Old Town, a UNESCO World Heritage Site and Historic Monument of Poland

The top tourist destination of the voivodeship is the capital city of Warsaw with its Old Town and Royal Castle, a UNESCO World Heritage Site and Historic Monument of Poland. Further Historic Monuments in Warsaw include the Royal Route with several palaces and parks, most notably the Łazienki Palace and Wilanów Palace, and the Warsaw Water Filters.

Other historic cities include Radom with its old center and parks, Pułtusk with the longest paved marketplace of Europe, and Płock, former medieval capital of Poland, with its Old Town and Wzgórze Tumskie ("Cathedral Hill") with the Płock Castle and the Płock Cathedral, which contains the sarcophagi of a number of Polish monarchs.

There are several medieval castles, including at Ciechanów, Czersk, Liw, Płock, and numerous palaces in the voivodeship, including at Otwock Wielki, Guzów, Radziejowice, Krubki-Górki, Sanniki, Korczew and multiple in Warsaw itself. Unique historic churches include the Temple of Mercy and Charity in Płock, the worldwide headquarters of the Mariavite Church, the Abbey Church in Czerwińsk nad Wisłą, one of the best preserved Romanesque fortified churches in Poland, and the Saints Roch and John the Baptist church in Brochów, a Gothic-Renaissance fortified church, place of baptism of Fryderyk Chopin. Otwock, Józefów and Warsaw are home to the local Świdermajer architectural style. There are also the Modlin Fortress and Warsaw Citadel.

The sole spa town of the voivodeship is Konstancin-Jeziorna.

There are museums dedicated to composer Fryderyk Chopin and chemist Marie Curie at their birthplaces in Żelazowa Wola and Warsaw, respectively. There is also a Fryderyk Chopin Museum in Warsaw. There is a museum dedicated to famous Renaissance poet Jan Kochanowski in Czarnolas. The Krasiński Palace in Opinogóra Górna hosts the Museum of Romanticism.

There are numerous World War II memorials, including memorials at the sites of Nazi massacres of Poles, including Palmiry, and Holocaust memorials, and museums at the sites of the former Nazi German Treblinka extermination camp, Pawiak Prison in Warsaw and Dulag 121 camp in Pruszków. Two of the few Italian war cemeteries in Poland are located in Warsaw (from both world wars) and Nowe Opole (from WW2).

The highest point in the voivodeship, 408-metre (1,339 ft), Góra Altana, is located south of Szydłowiec, near the southern boundary with the Świętokrzyskie Voivodeship.

== Sports ==
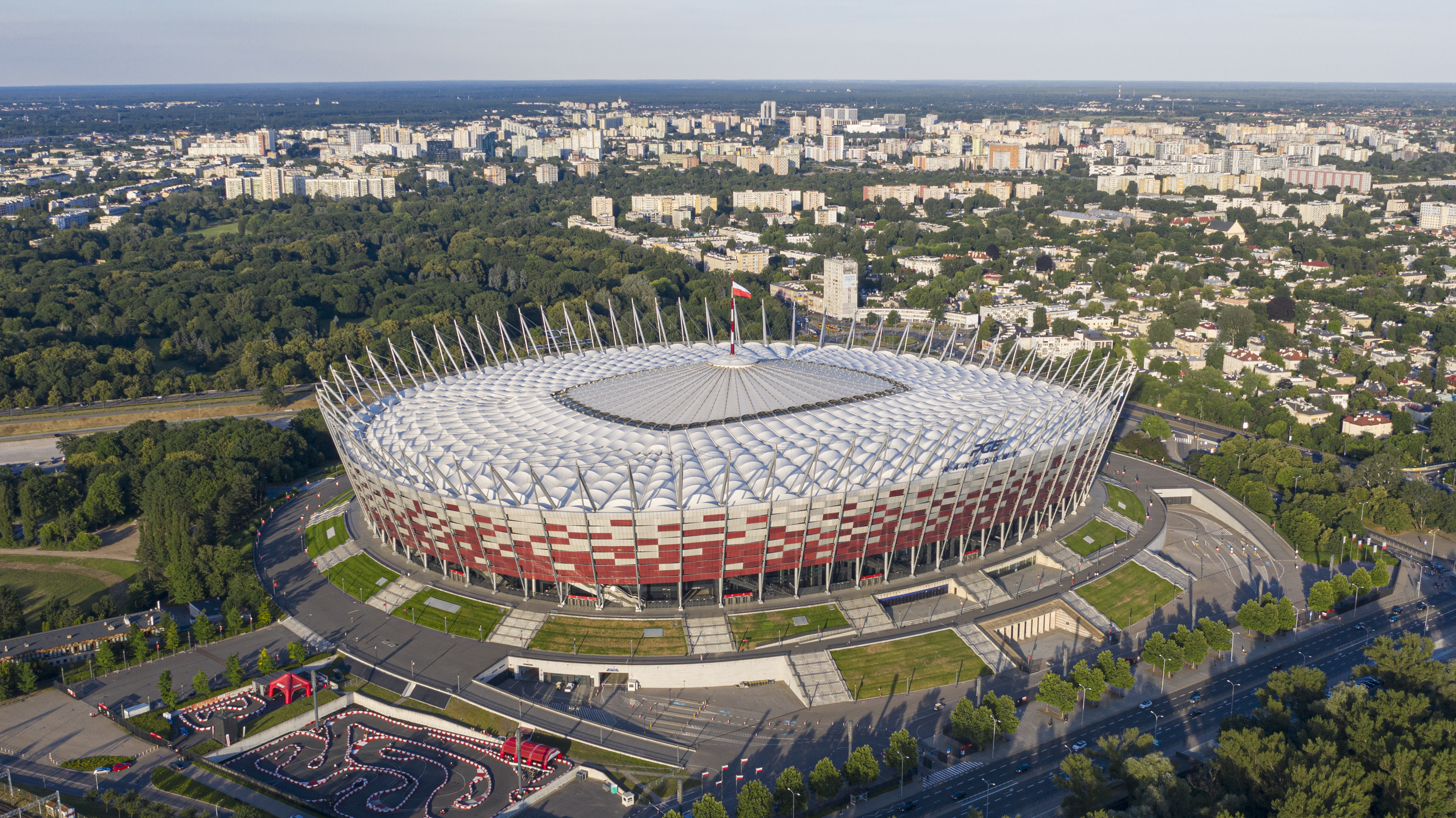
Kazimierz Górski National Stadium in Warsaw, one of the arenas of the UEFA Euro 2012, 2014 FIVB Volleyball Men's World Championship, 2017 Men's European Volleyball Championship and Speedway Grand Prix of Poland

Football, handball, volleyball and basketball enjoy the largest following in the voivodeship. Successful clubs include Legia Warsaw and Polonia Warsaw in football and basketball, and Wisła Płock in handball.

Since the establishment of the province, several major international sports competitions were co-hosted by the province, including the 2002 World Weightlifting Championships, 2003 World Short Track Speed Skating Championships, 2009 UCI Track Cycling World Championships, EuroBasket 2009, UEFA Euro 2012, 2014 FIVB Volleyball Men's World Championship, 2017 Men's European Volleyball Championship, 2018 FIVB Volleyball Men's Club World Championship, 2019 UCI Track Cycling World Championships, 2023 World Men's Handball Championship.

Deepspot, the world's second deepest swimming pool, is located in Mszczonów.

== Curiosities ==
- The voivodeship contains both the current capital of Poland (Warsaw) and one of the former medieval capitals of Poland (Płock).
- In the 17th century, there were sizeable Scottish communities in Warsaw, Raciąż, Sierpc and Zakroczym, and also smaller ones in Iłża, Jedlińsk, Radom, Skrzynno, Szydłowiec and Węgrów.
- The village of Krasiniec was the home of the sole Kalmyk community of Poland in the interbellum.
- One of the three parish churches of the Armenian Catholic Church in Poland is located in Warsaw (see also: Armenians in Poland).

== Gallery ==
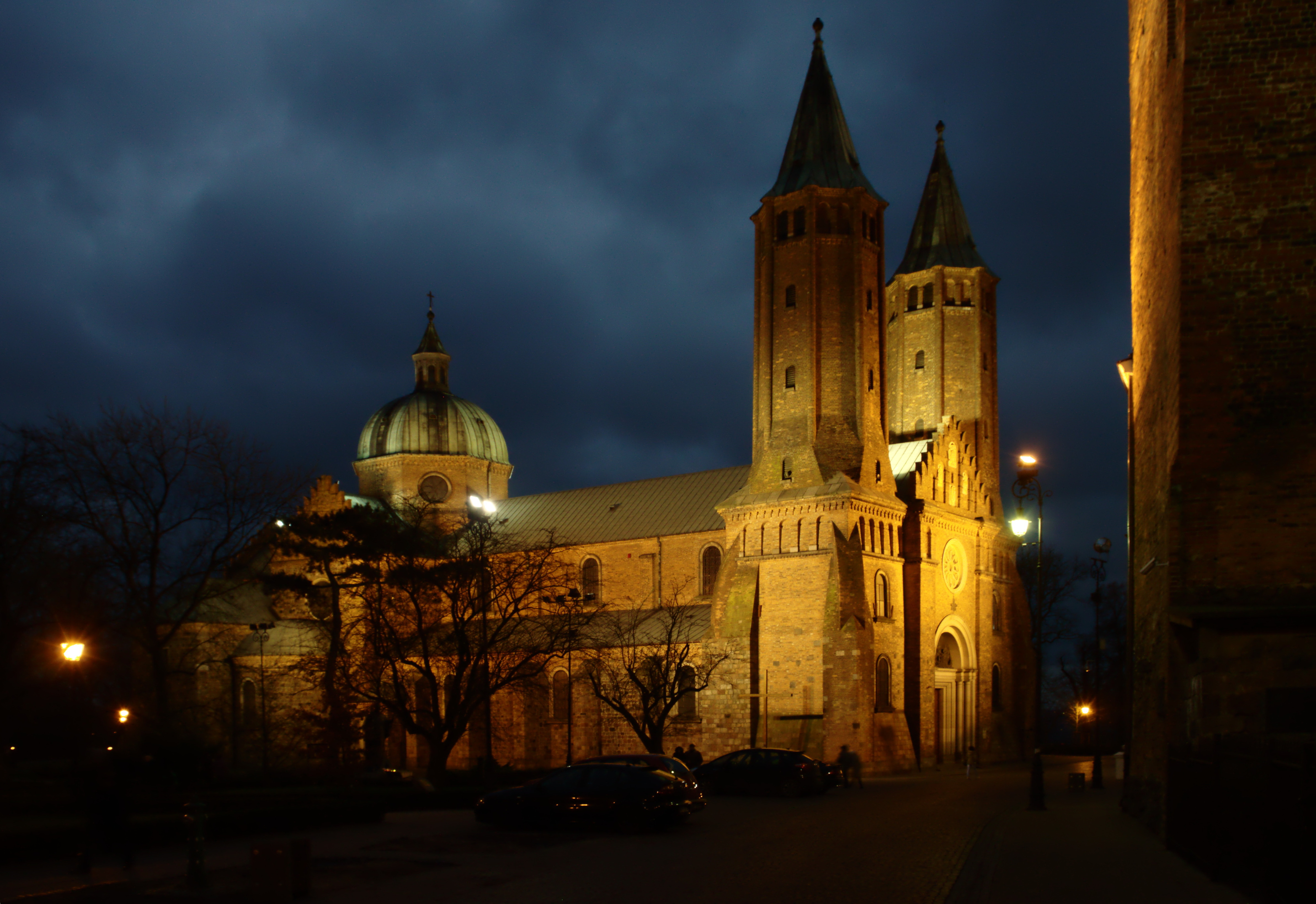
Płock Cathedral, burial site of Polish monarchs

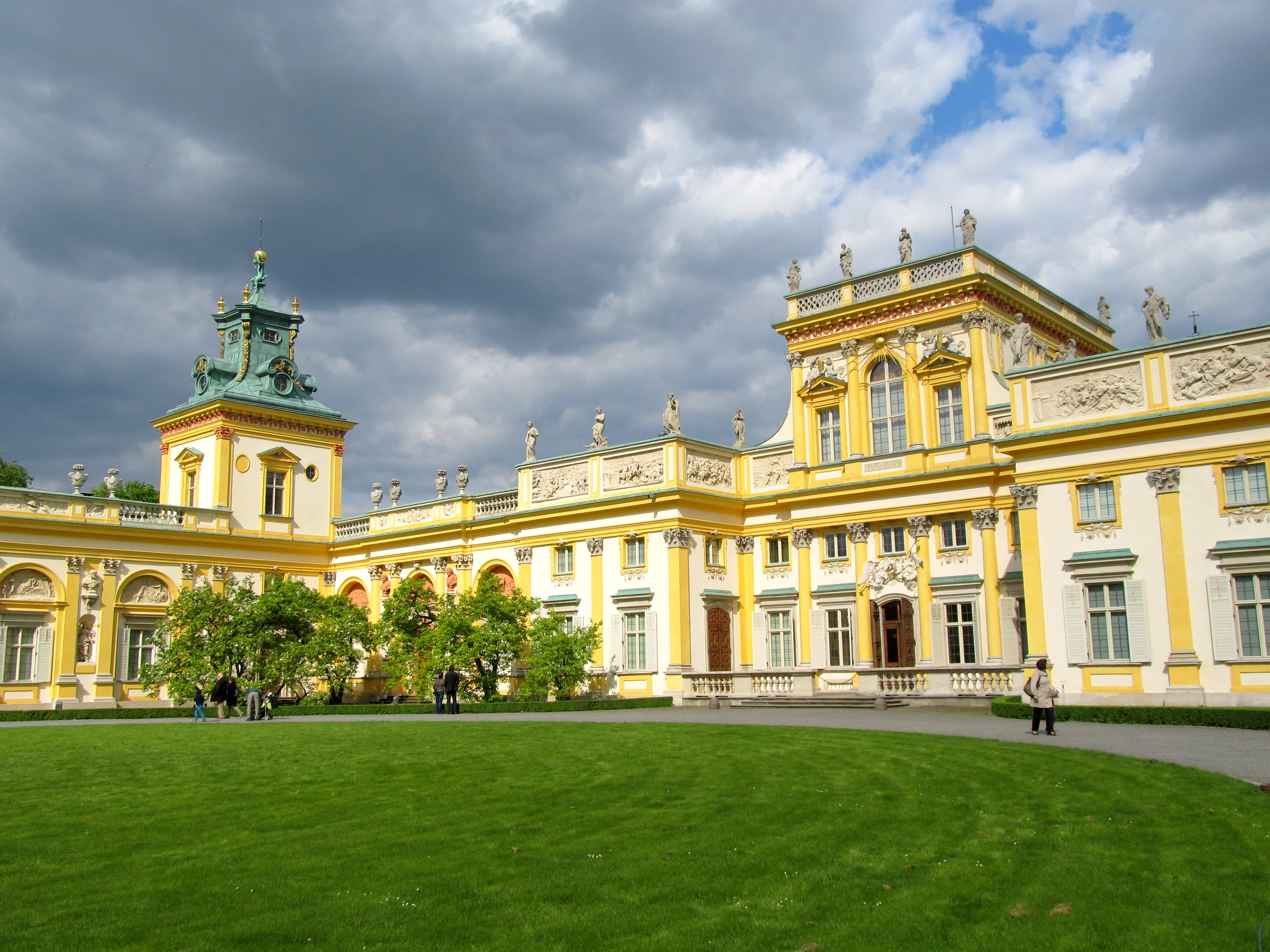
Wilanów Palace in Warsaw

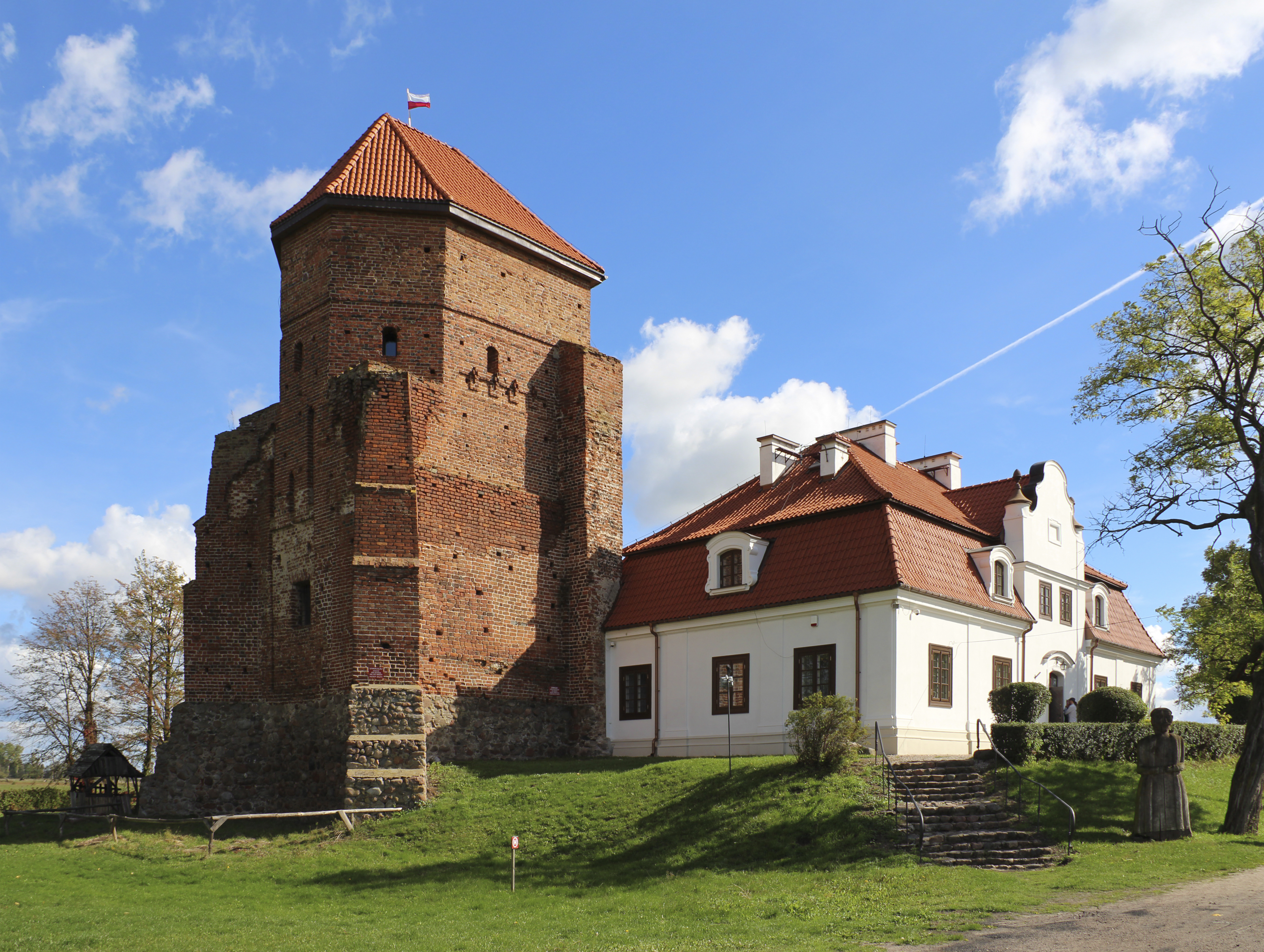
Liw Castle

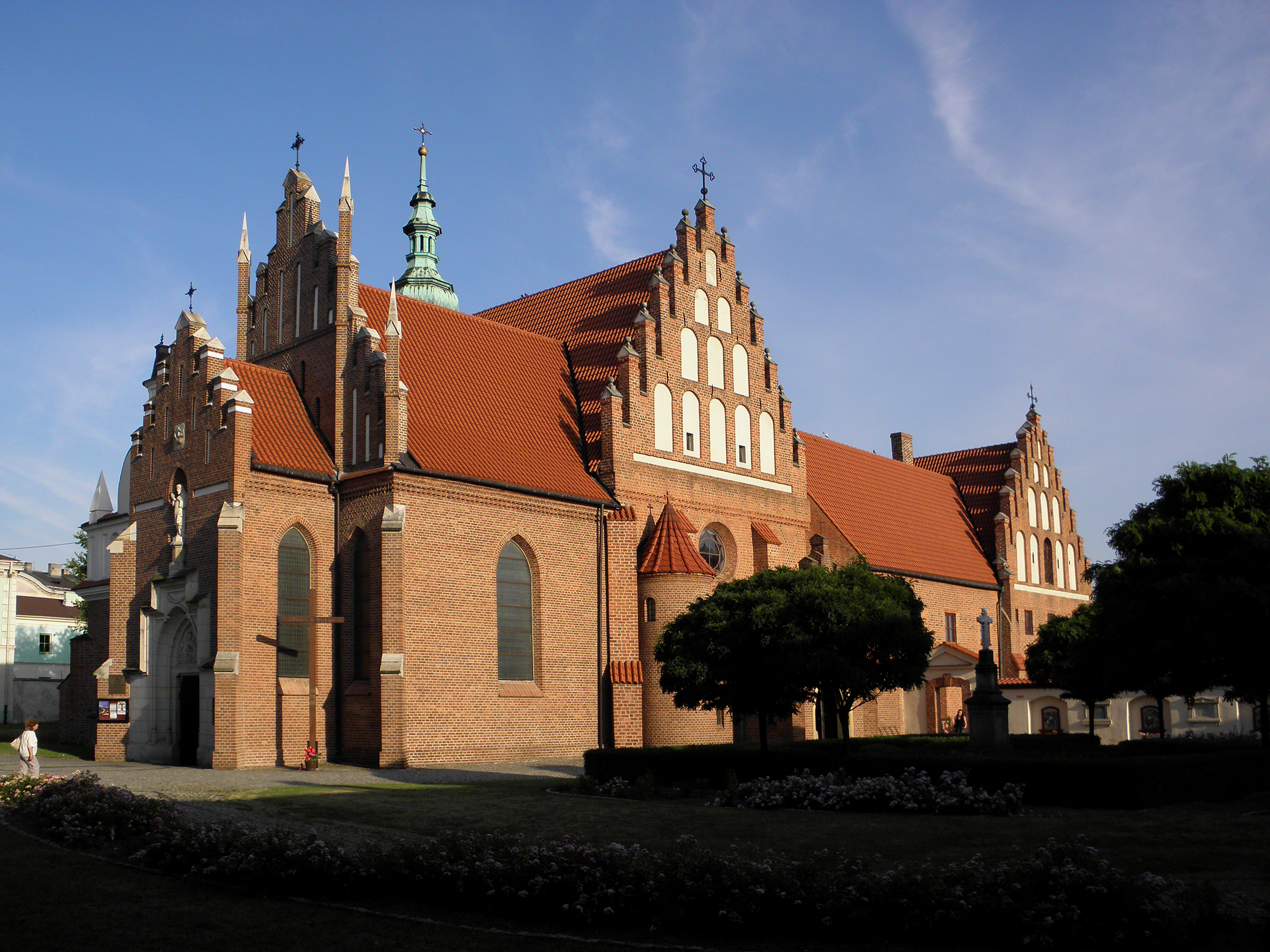
Saint Catherine of Alexandria church in Radom

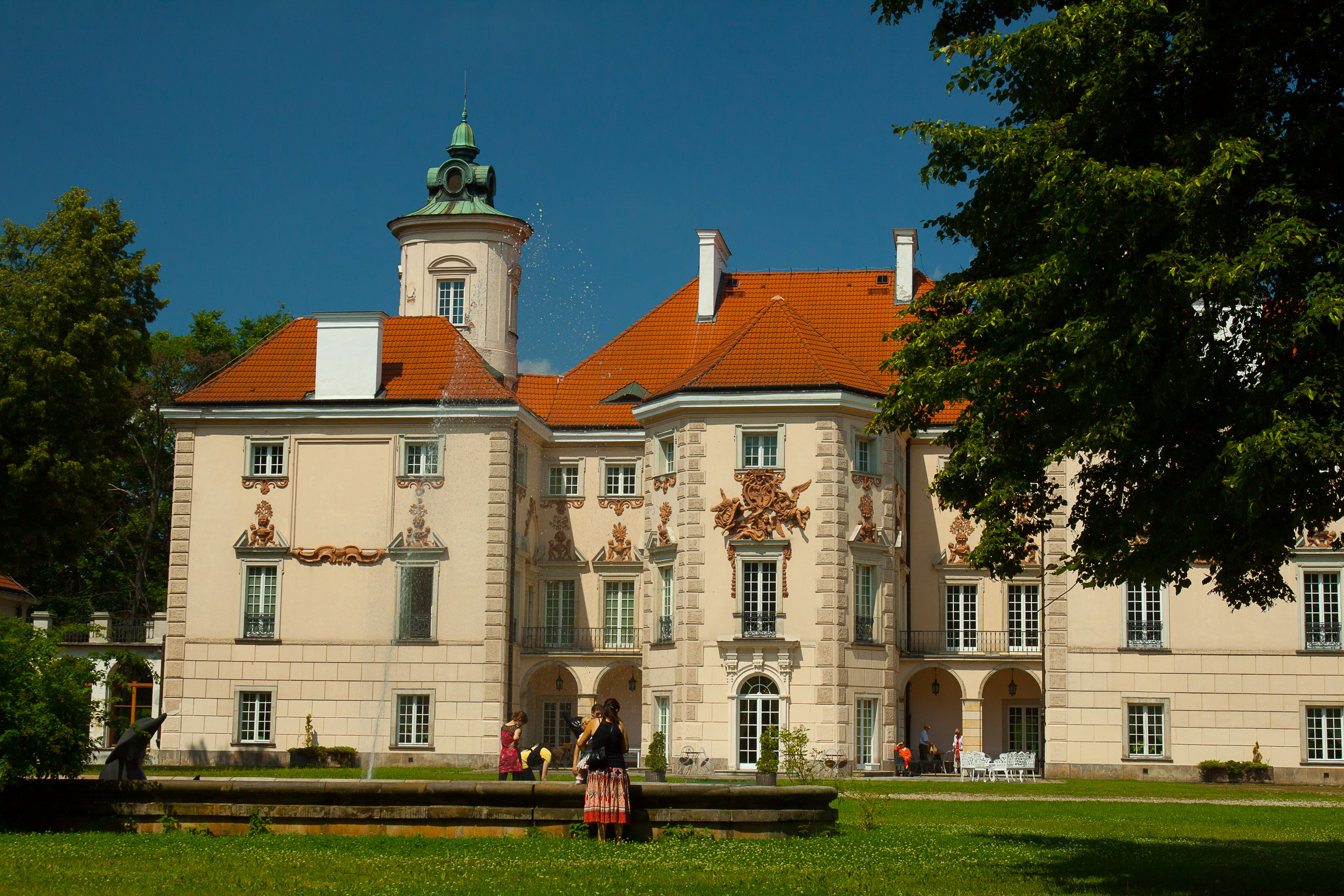
Palace in Otwock Wielki

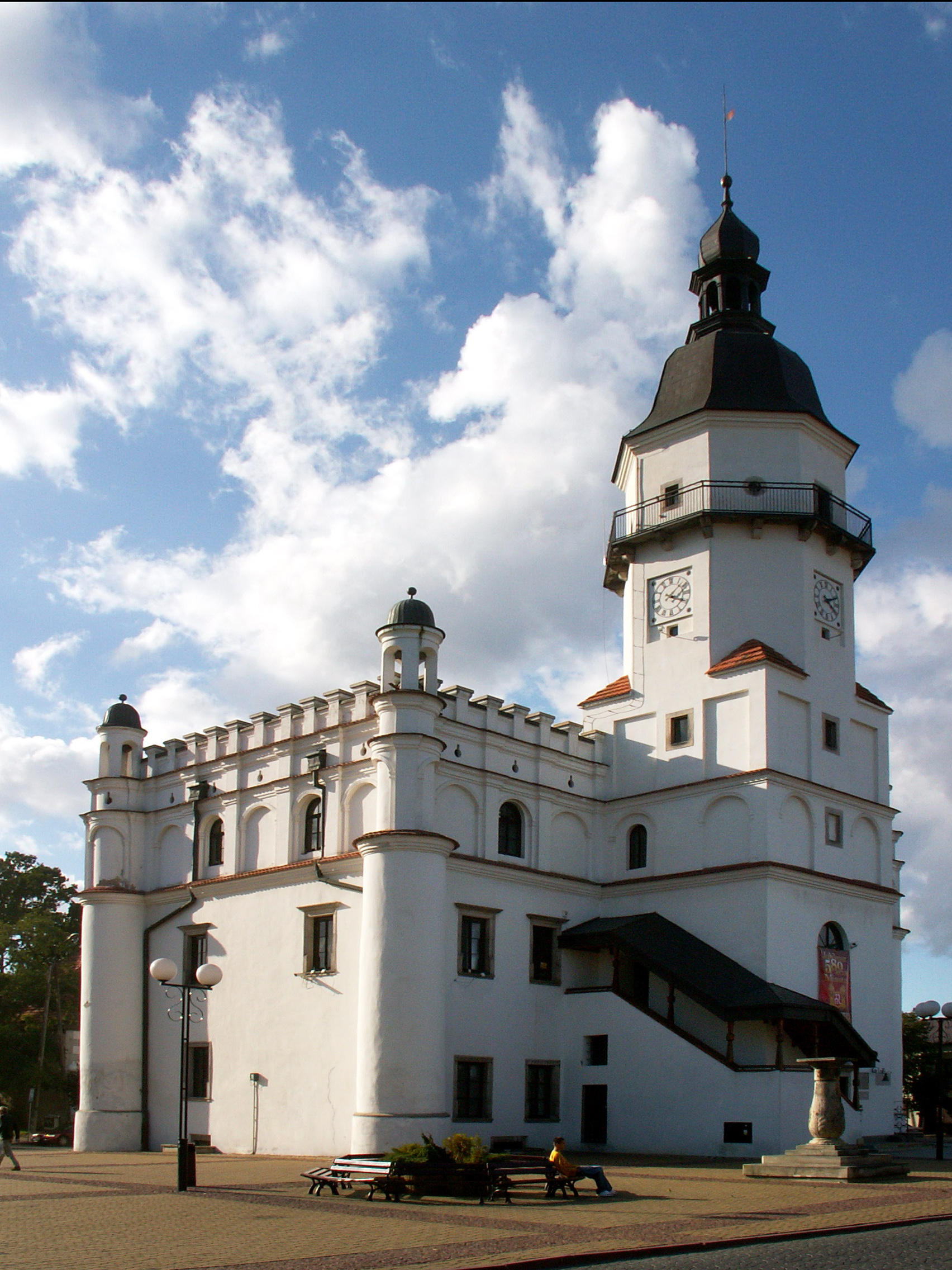
Szydłowiec Town Hall

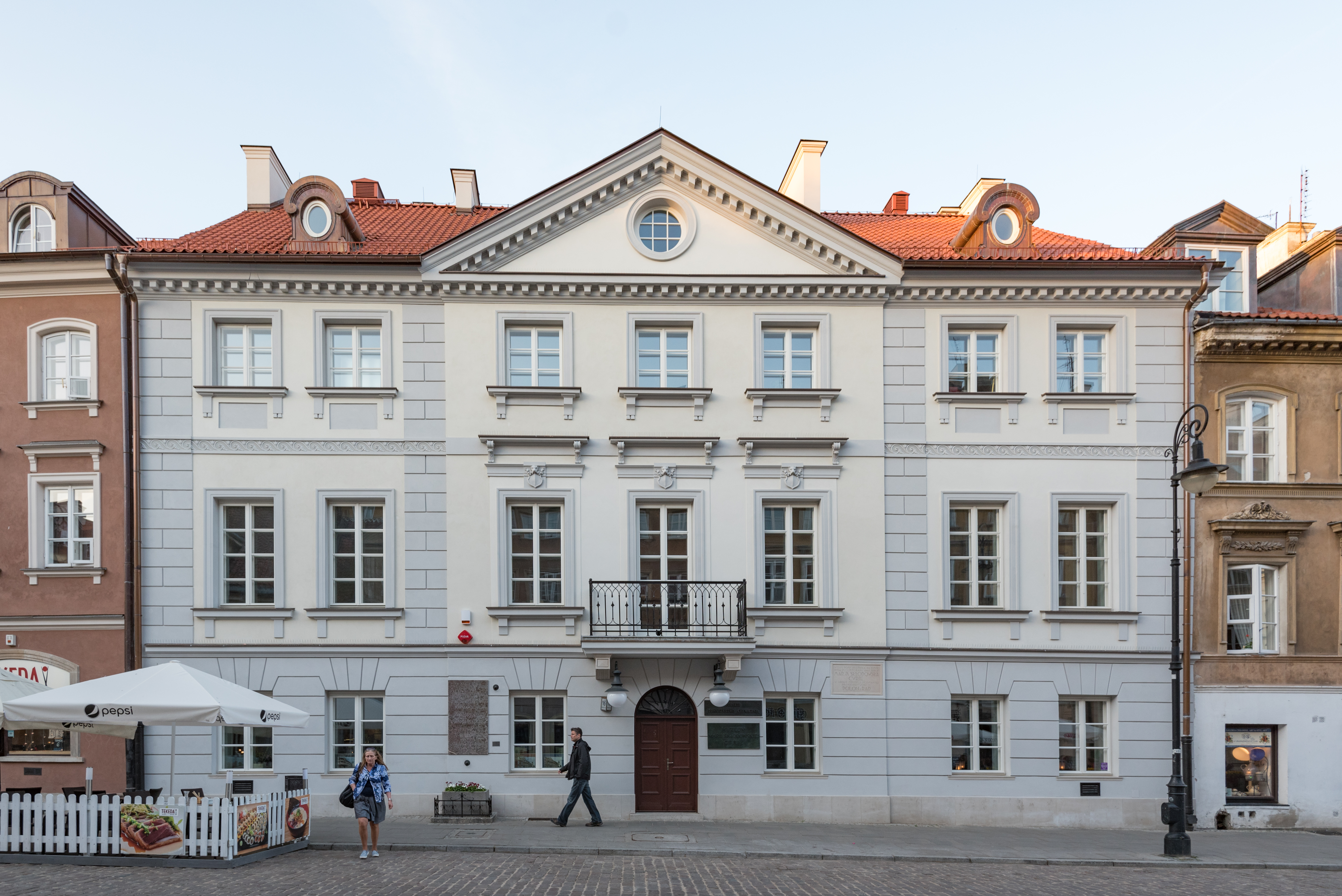
Łyszkiewicz Apartment in Warsaw, birthplace of Marie Curie, presently a museum of the Nobel Prize winner

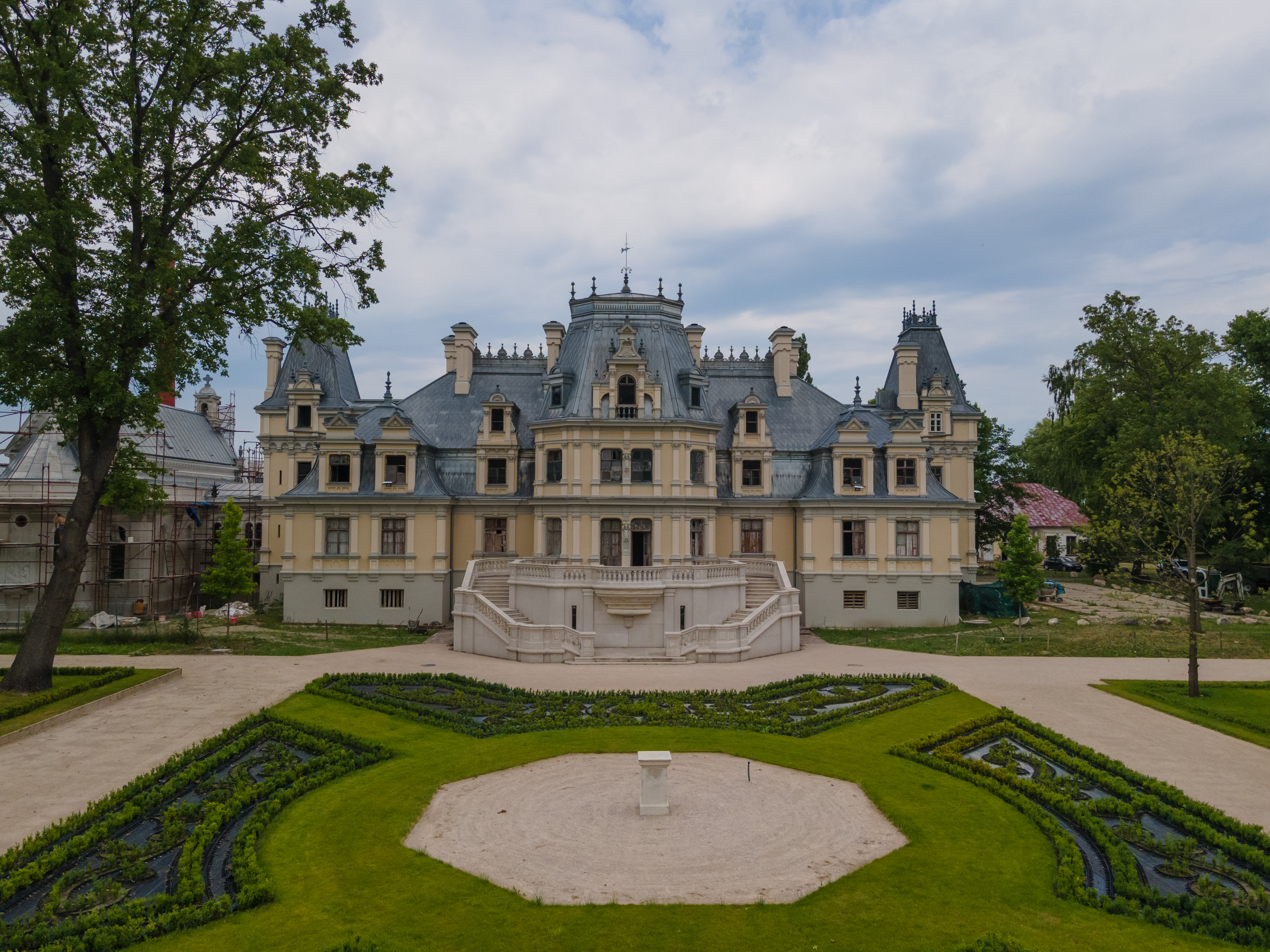
Sobański Palace in Guzów

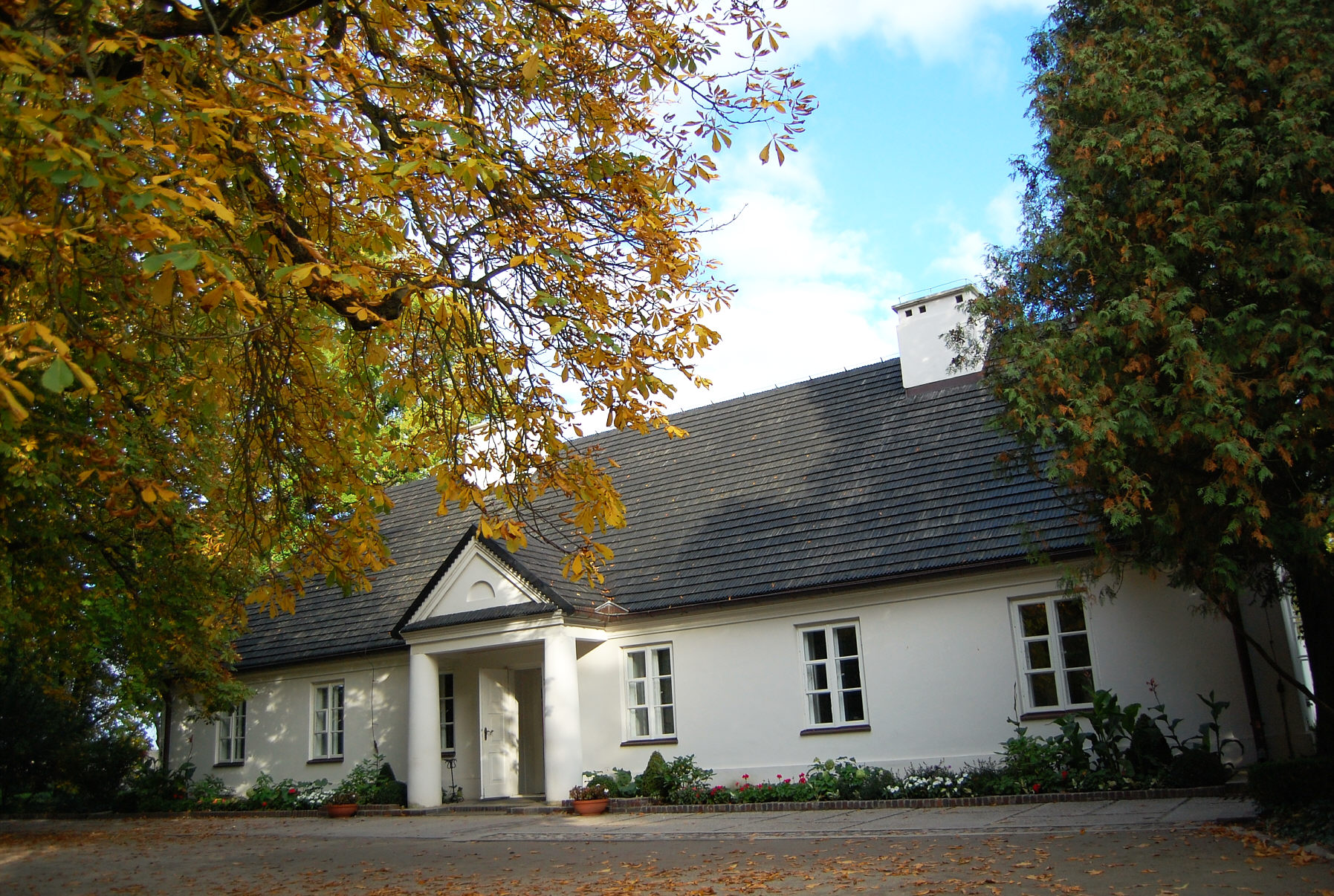
Birthplace of Frédéric Chopin in Żelazowa Wola, presently a museum of the composer

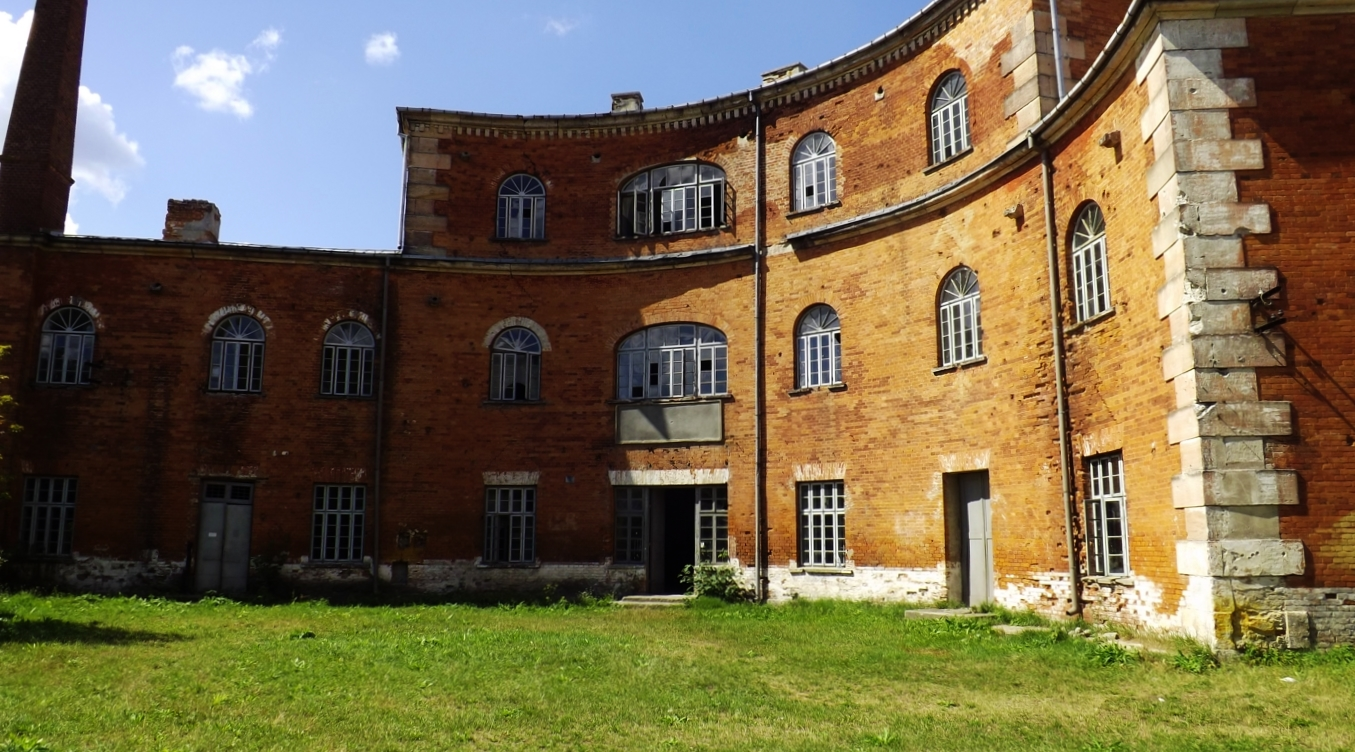
Modlin Fortress

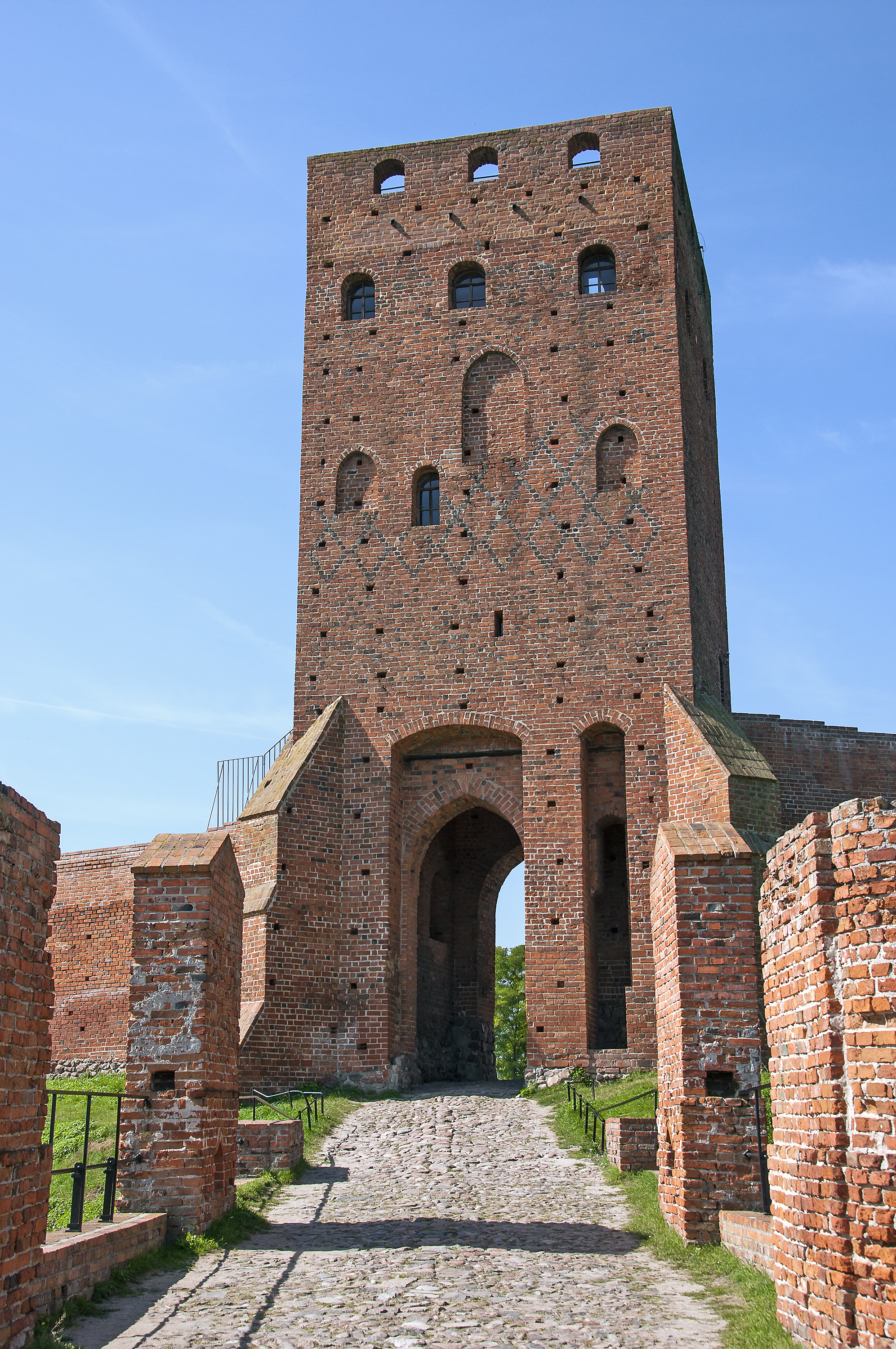
Czersk Castle

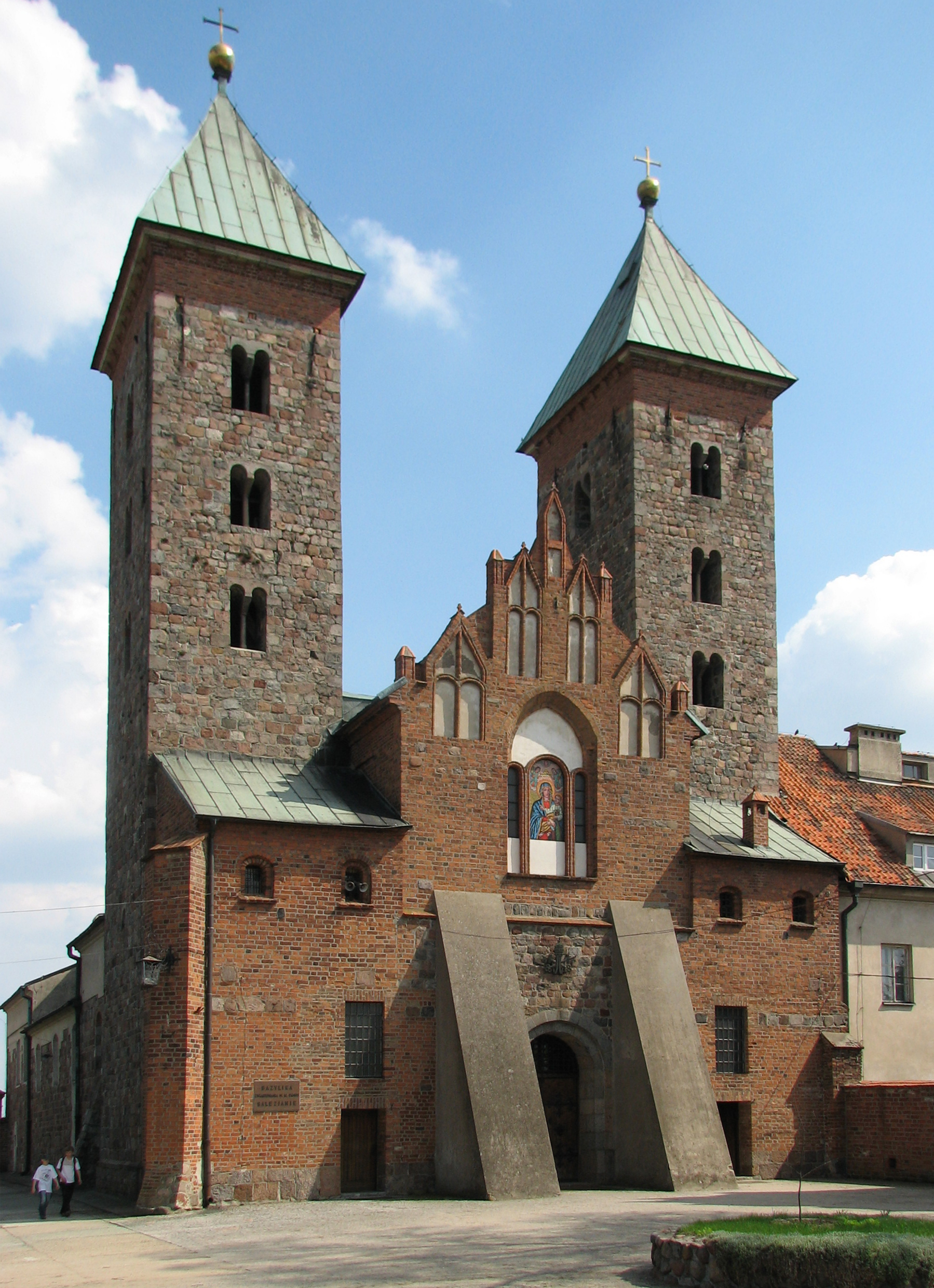
Abbey Church in Czerwińsk nad Wisłą

== See also ==
- Warsaw Voivodeship (1919–1939)
