= Biejków =

- Village
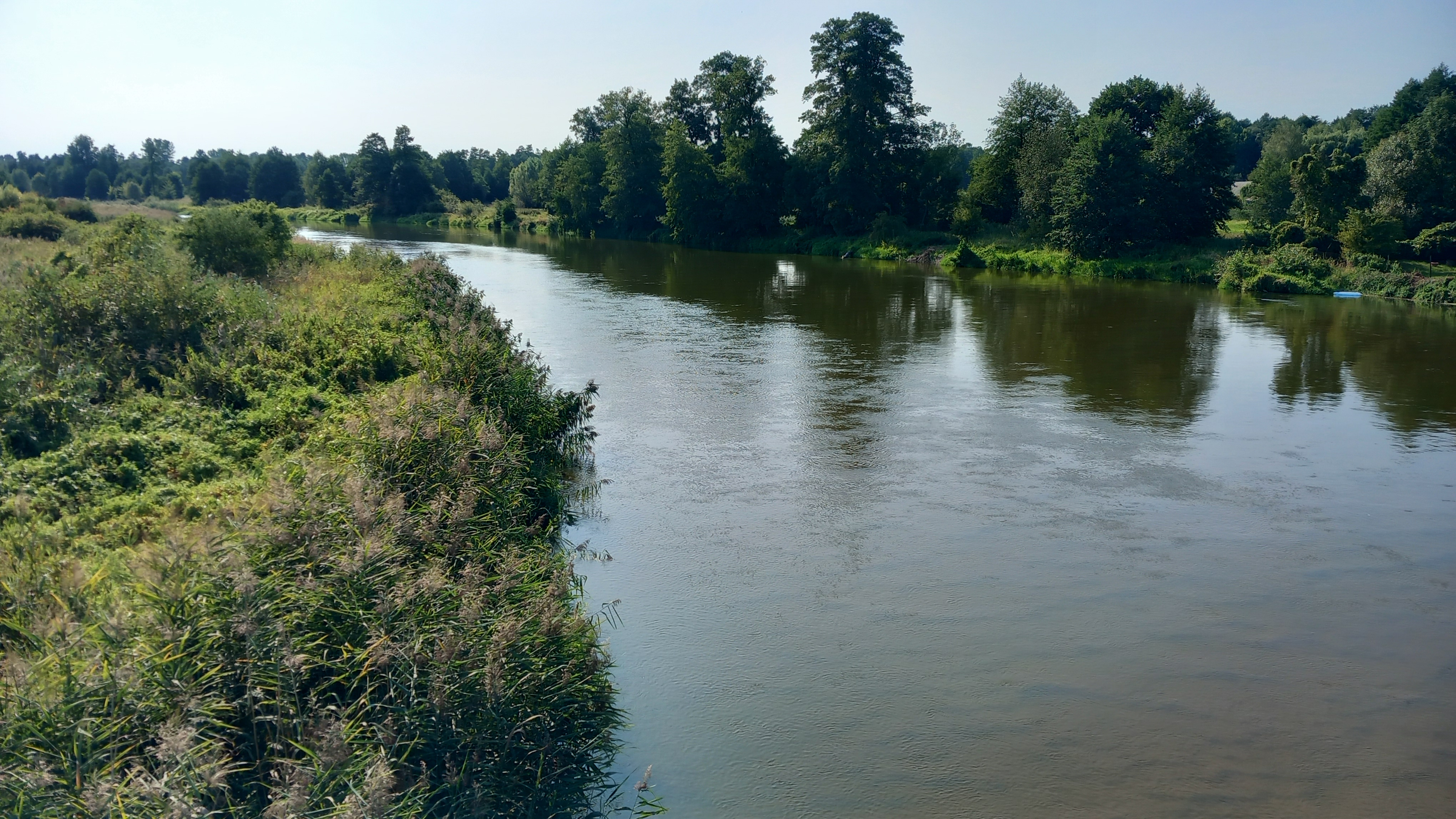
- Pilica River in Biejków

- Location within Poland
- Coordinates: 51°42′N 21°0′E
- Country: Poland
- Voivodeship: Masovian
- County: Białobrzegi
- Gmina: Promna
- Time zone: UTC+1 (CET)
  - Summer (DST): UTC+2 (CEST)

Biejków [ˈbjɛi̯kuf] is a village in the administrative district of Gmina Promna, in Białobrzegi County, Masovian Voivodeship, south-central Poland. It is approximately 4 km (2 mi) northeast of Promna, 7 km (4 mi) northeast of Białobrzegi, and 58 km (36 mi) south of Warsaw.

Five Polish citizens were murdered by Nazi Germany in the village during World War II.
