= Kobylnik =

Kobylnik may refer to:

- Kobylnik, Złotów County
- Stary Kobylnik
- Nowy Kobylnik
- Narach (village), a.k.a. Kobylnik or Kobylniki
