= Sopot (disambiguation) =

Sopot may refer to:

== Albania ==
- Sopot, Albania (Sopoti), a region, mountain and village

== Antarctica ==
- Sopot Ice Piedmont, an ice piedmont on Livingston Island

== Bosnia and Herzegovina ==
- Sopot, Konjic, a village

== Bulgaria ==
- Sopot, Plovdiv Province, a town and seat of the Sopot Municipality
  - Sopot Municipality, Bulgaria
- Sopot, Lovech Province, a village in the Ugarchin Municipality

== Croatia ==
- Sopot, Krapina-Zagorje County, a village in the city of Pregrada
- Sopot, Zagreb, a neighbourhood of Zagreb
- Sopot, Vinkovci, an archaeological site located near the city of Vinkovci

== North Macedonia ==
- Sopot, Veles, a village in Veles Municipality
- Sopot, Kumanovo, a village
- Sopot, Kavadarci, a village
- Sopot, Sveti Nikole, a village in Sveti Nikole Municipality

== Poland ==
- Sopot (river), a tributary of the Tanew
- Sopot, a seaside resort city in Pomeranian Voivodeship

== Romania ==
- Sopot, Dolj, a commune in Dolj County

== Serbia ==
- Sopot, Belgrade, a town and municipality
- Sopot, Pirot, a village

== Kosovo ==
- Sopot, Gjakova, a village in the municipality of Gjakova

== See also ==
- Grodzisko in Sopot, an early settlement in Poland
- Šopot, a village in the city of Benkovac, Croatia
- Șopot (disambiguation)
- Stary Sopot, a village in Poland
- Sopoty, a village in Poland
- Victor Sopot, a main character in the video game Red Faction II
