= Krzywda =

Krzywda may refer to the following places:

- Krzywda, Lublin Voivodeship (east Poland)
- Krzywda, Białobrzegi County in Masovian Voivodeship (east-central Poland)
- Krzywda, Garwolin County in Masovian Voivodeship (east-central Poland)
- Krzywda, Zwoleń County in Masovian Voivodeship (east-central Poland)
- Krzywda, Greater Poland Voivodeship (west-central Poland)
- Krzywda, Pomeranian Voivodeship (north Poland)
