= Helenów =

Helenów may refer to the following places:

- Helenów, Gmina Bełchatów in Łódź Voivodeship (central Poland)
- Helenów, Gmina Drużbice in Łódź Voivodeship (central Poland)
- Helenów, Brzeziny County in Łódź Voivodeship (central Poland)
- Helenów, Rawa County in Łódź Voivodeship (central Poland)
- Helenów, Gmina Budziszewice in Łódź Voivodeship (central Poland)
- Helenów, Gmina Czerniewice in Łódź Voivodeship (central Poland)
- Helenów, Gmina Ujazd in Łódź Voivodeship (central Poland)
- Helenów, Gmina Głowno in Łódź Voivodeship (central Poland)
- Helenów, Gmina Ozorków in Łódź Voivodeship (central Poland)
- Helenów, Chełm County in Lublin Voivodeship (east Poland)
- Helenów, Gmina Adamów in Lublin Voivodeship (east Poland)
- Helenów, Gmina Wojcieszków in Lublin Voivodeship (east Poland)
- Helenów, Białobrzegi County in Masovian Voivodeship (east-central Poland)
- Helenów, Gmina Gostynin in Masovian Voivodeship (east-central Poland)
- Helenów, Gmina Szczawin Kościelny in Masovian Voivodeship (east-central Poland)
- Helenów, Kozienice County in Masovian Voivodeship (east-central Poland)
- Helenów, Lipsko County in Masovian Voivodeship (east-central Poland)
- Helenów, Przasnysz County in Masovian Voivodeship (east-central Poland)
- Helenów, Radom County in Masovian Voivodeship (east-central Poland)
- Helenów, Gmina Wiśniew in Masovian Voivodeship (east-central Poland)
- Helenów, Gmina Wodynie in Masovian Voivodeship (east-central Poland)
- Helenów, Sochaczew County in Masovian Voivodeship (east-central Poland)
- Helenów, Szydłowiec County in Masovian Voivodeship (east-central Poland)
- Helenów, Węgrów County in Masovian Voivodeship (east-central Poland)
- Helenów, Gmina Wołomin in Masovian Voivodeship (east-central Poland)
- Helenów, Gmina Poświętne in Masovian Voivodeship (east-central Poland)
- Helenów, Gmina Zwoleń in Masovian Voivodeship (east-central Poland)
- Helenów, Gmina Policzna in Masovian Voivodeship (east-central Poland)
- Helenów, Gmina Przyłęk in Masovian Voivodeship (east-central Poland)
- Helenów, Gmina Szczytniki in Greater Poland Voivodeship (west-central Poland)
- Helenów, Gmina Żelazków in Greater Poland Voivodeship (west-central Poland)
