= Chruściechów, Masovian Voivodeship =

Chruściechów
- Village
- Location within Poland
- Coordinates: 51°34′43″N 20°57′40″E
- Country: Poland
- Voivodeship: Masovian
- County: Białobrzegi
- Gmina: Stara Błotnica
- Population: 150

Chruściechów [xruɕˈt͡ɕɛxuf] is a village in the administrative district of Gmina Stara Błotnica, within Białobrzegi County, Masovian Voivodeship, in east-central Poland.
