= Wojciechówka, Gmina Białobrzegi =

Wojciechówka
- Village
- Location within Poland
- Coordinates: 51°37′35″N 21°00′55″E
- Country: Poland
- Voivodeship: Masovian
- County: Białobrzegi
- Gmina: Białobrzegi

Wojciechówka (Polish pronunciation: [vɔjt͡ɕɛˈxufka]) is a village in the administrative district of Gmina Białobrzegi, within Białobrzegi County, Masovian Voivodeship, in east-central Poland.
