= Domaniewice =

Domaniewice may refer to the following places:

- Domaniewice, Lesser Poland Voivodeship (south Poland)
- Domaniewice, Łódź Voivodeship (central Poland)
- Domaniewice, Białobrzegi County in Masovian Voivodeship (east-central Poland)
- Domaniewice, Grójec County in Masovian Voivodeship (east-central Poland)
