= Stanisławów, Białobrzegi County =

Stanisławów
- Village
- Location within Poland
- Coordinates: 51°42′28″N 20°56′23″E
- Country: Poland
- Voivodeship: Masovian
- County: Białobrzegi
- Gmina: Promna

Stanisławów [staniˈswavuf] is a village in the administrative district of Gmina Promna, within Białobrzegi County, Masovian Voivodeship, in east-central Poland.
