= Stary Kiełbów =

- Village
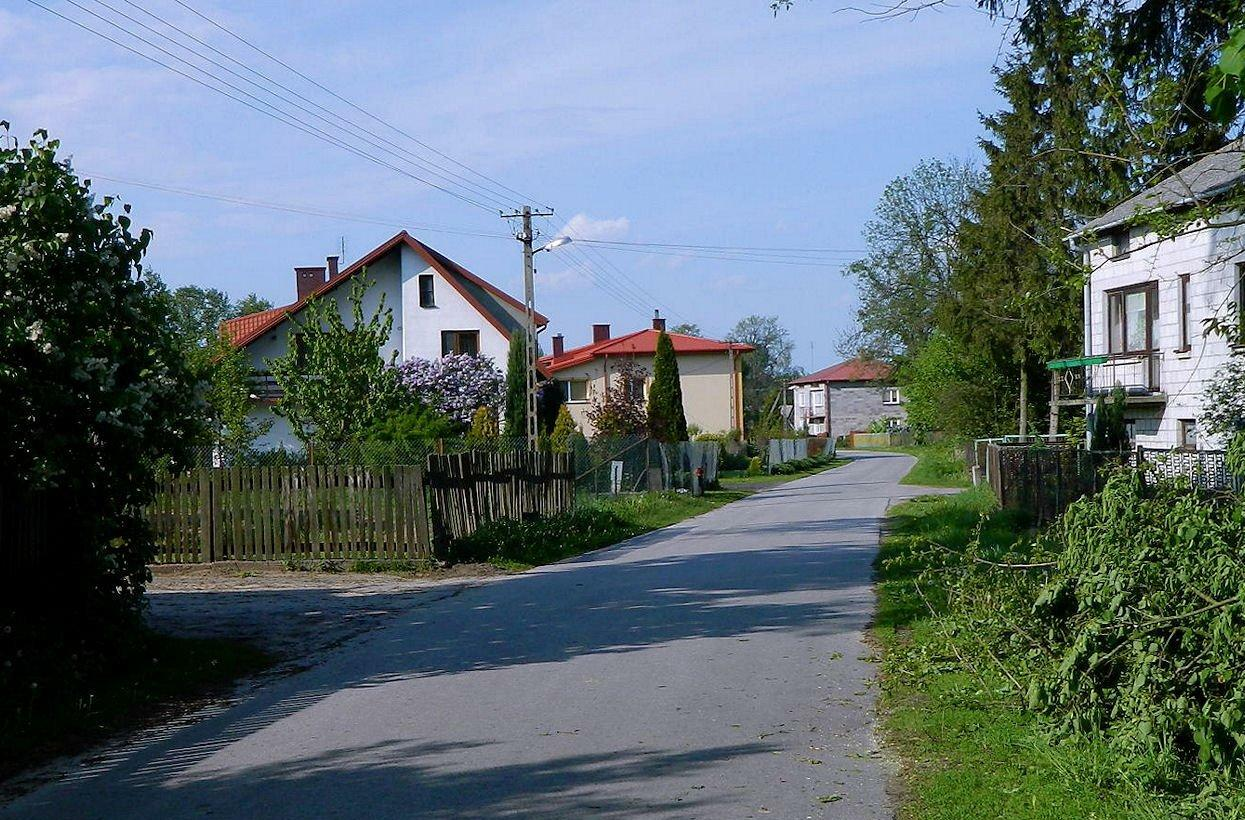

- Location within Poland
- Coordinates: 51°33′51″N 21°00′06″E
- Country: Poland
- Voivodeship: Masovian
- County: Białobrzegi
- Gmina: Stara Błotnica
- Time zone: UTC+1 (CET)
  - Summer (DST): UTC+2 (CEST)
- Vehicle registration: WBR
- Primary airport: Radom Airport

Stary Kiełbów [ˈstarɨ ˈkʲɛu̯buf] is a village in the administrative district of Gmina Stara Błotnica, within Białobrzegi County, Masovian Voivodeship, in east-central Poland.

== History ==
Stary Kiełbów was the location of a motte-and-bailey castle from the 13th-14th century, located on a trade route which connected Radom and Grójec. It is now an archaeological site. Since the 1960s, archaeologists discovered fragments of medieval pottery and armor in the village. In the following centuries, Kiełbów was a private village of Polish nobility, administratively located in the Radom County in the Sandomierz Voivodeship in the Lesser Poland Province of the Polish Crown.

== Transport ==
The Voivodeship road 732 runs through the village, and the Expressway S7, part of the European route E77, runs nearby, east of the village.
