= Gmina Stara Błotnica =

Gmina Stara Błotnica Stara Błotnica Commune
- Gmina
- Flag Coat of arms
- Interactive map of Gmina Stara Błotnica
- Coordinates (Stara Błotnica): 51°33′N 20°59′E
- Country: Poland
- Voivodeship: Masovian
- County: Białobrzegi
- Seat: Stara Błotnica

Area
  - Total: 96.24 km^{2} (37.16 sq mi)

Population (2006)
  - Total: 5,252
  - Density: 54.57/km^{2} (141.3/sq mi)
- Website: http://www.starablotnica.pl

Gmina Stara Błotnica is a rural gmina (administrative district) in Białobrzegi County, Masovian Voivodeship, in east-central Poland. Its seat is the village of Stara Błotnica, which lies approximately 11 kilometres (7 mi) south of Białobrzegi and 76 km (47 mi) south of Warsaw.

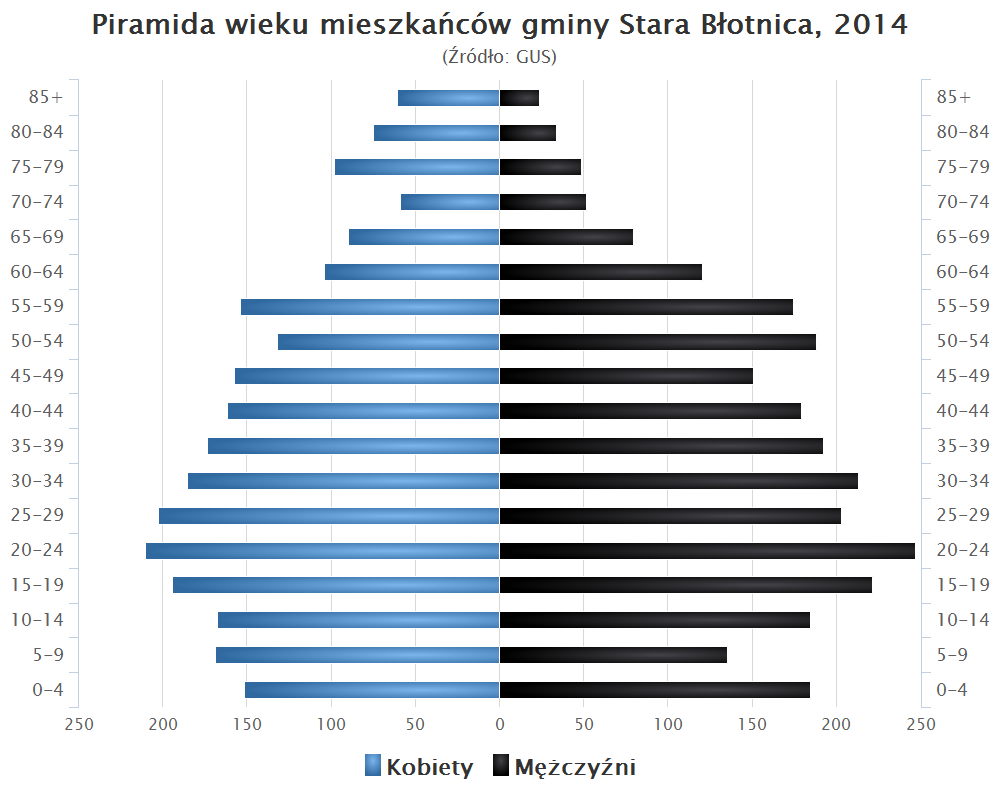

The gmina covers an area of 96.24 square kilometres (37.2 sq mi) and, in 2006, its total population was 5,252.

== Villages ==
Gmina Stara Błotnica contains the villages and settlements of Chruściechów, Cupel, Czyżówka, Grodzisko, Jakubów, Kaszów, Krzywda, Łępin, Nowy Gózd, Nowy Kadłubek, Nowy Kiełbów, Nowy Kobylnik, Pągowiec, Pierzchnia, Ryki, Siemiradz, Stara Błotnica, Stare Siekluki, Stare Żdżary, Stary Gózd, Stary Kadłub, Stary Kadłubek, Stary Kiełbów, Stary Kobylnik, Stary Osów, Stary Sopot, Tursk, Żabia Wola and Zamłynie.

== Neighbouring gminas ==
Gmina Stara Błotnica is bordered by the gminas of Białobrzegi, Jedlińsk, Przytyk, Radzanów, Stromiec and Zakrzew.
