= Pacew =

- Village
- Location within Poland
- Coordinates: 51°40′14″N 20°53′16″E
- Country: Poland
- Voivodeship: Masovian
- County: Białobrzegi
- Gmina: Promna

Pacew [ˈpat͡sɛf] is a village in the administrative district of Gmina Promna, within Białobrzegi County, Masovian Voivodeship, in east-central Poland.
