= Gmina Promna =

Gmina Promna Promna Commune
- Gmina
- Interactive map of Gmina Promna
- Coordinates (Promna): 51°41′N 20°57′E
- Country: Poland
- Voivodeship: Masovian
- County: Białobrzegi
- Seat: Promna

Area
  - Total: 120.74 km^{2} (46.62 sq mi)

Population (2006)
  - Total: 5,612
  - Density: 46.48/km^{2} (120.4/sq mi)
- Website: http://www.promna.pl

Gmina Promna is a rural gmina (administrative district) in Białobrzegi County, Masovian Voivodeship, in east-central Poland. Its seat is the village of Promna, which lies approximately 4 kilometres (2 mi) north of Białobrzegi and 60 km (37 mi) south of Warsaw.

The gmina covers an area of 120.74 square kilometres (46.6 sq mi), and as of 2006 its total population is 5,612.

== Villages ==
Gmina Promna contains the villages and settlements of Adamów, Biejków, Biejkowska Wola, Bronisławów, Broniszew, Daltrozów, Domaniewice, Falęcice, Falęcice-Parcela, Falęcice-Wola, Gajówka Jastrzębia, Góry, Helenów, Jadwigów, Karolin, Lekarcice, Lekarcice Nowe, Lekarcice Stare, Lisów, Mała Wieś, Mała Wysoka, Olkowice, Olszamy, Osuchów, Pacew, Pelinów, Piekarty, Piotrów, Pnie, Promna, Promna-Kolonia, Przybyszew, Rykały, Sielce, Stanisławów, Wojciechówka, Wola Branecka and Zbrosza Mała.

== Neighbouring gminas ==
Gmina Promna is bordered by the gminas of Białobrzegi, Goszczyn, Jasieniec, Mogielnica, Warka and Wyśmierzyce.
