= Jabłonna, Białobrzegi County =

Jabłonna
- Village
- Location within Poland
- Coordinates: 51°34′N 20°44′E
- Country: Poland
- Voivodeship: Masovian
- County: Białobrzegi
- Gmina: Wyśmierzyce

Jabłonna [jaˈbwɔnna] is a village in the administrative district of Gmina Wyśmierzyce, within Białobrzegi County, Masovian Voivodeship, in east-central Poland.
