= Sucha, Białobrzegi County =

Sucha
- Village
- Location within Poland
- Coordinates: 51°37′13″N 20°56′48″E
- Country: Poland
- Voivodeship: Masovian
- County: Białobrzegi
- Gmina: Białobrzegi
- Population: 1,000

Sucha [ˈsuxa] is a village in the administrative district of Gmina Białobrzegi, within Białobrzegi County, Masovian Voivodeship, in east-central Poland.
