= Gmina Wyśmierzyce =

Gmina Wyśmierzyce Wyśmierzyce Commune
- Gmina
- Coat of arms
- Interactive map of Gmina Wyśmierzyce
- Coordinates (Wyśmierzyce): 51°37′25″N 20°49′12″E
- Country: Poland
- Voivodeship: Masovian
- County: Białobrzegi
- Seat: Wyśmierzyce

Area
  - Total: 104.31 km^{2} (40.27 sq mi)

Population (2006)
  - Total: 2,897
  - Density: 27.77/km^{2} (71.93/sq mi)
  - Urban: 889
  - Rural: 2,008

Gmina Wyśmierzyce is an urban-rural gmina (administrative district) in Białobrzegi County, Masovian Voivodeship, in east-central Poland. Its seat is the town of Wyśmierzyce, which lies approximately 10 kilometres (6 mi) west of Białobrzegi and 67 km (42 mi) south of Warsaw.

The gmina covers an area of 104.31 square kilometres (40.3 sq mi), and as of 2006 its total population is 2,897 (out of which the population of Wyśmierzyce amounts to 889, and the population of the rural part of the gmina is 2,008).

== Villages ==
Apart from the town of Wyśmierzyce, Gmina Wyśmierzyce contains the villages and settlements of Brodek, Górki, Grzmiąca, Jabłonna, Jeruzal, Kiedrzyn, Klamy, Korzeń, Kostrzyn, Kozłów, Kożuchów, Olszowe, Paprotno, Redlin, Romanów, Ulaski Grzmiąckie, Ulaski Stamirowskie, Witaszyn, and Wólka Kożuchowska.

== Neighbouring gminas ==
Gmina Wyśmierzyce is bordered by the gminas of Białobrzegi, Klwów, Mogielnica, Nowe Miasto nad Pilicą, Potworów, Promna, and Radzanów.
