= Kiedrzyn, Białobrzegi County =

Kiedrzyn
- Village
- Location within Poland
- Coordinates: 51°35′51″N 20°43′9″E
- Country: Poland
- Voivodeship: Masovian
- County: Białobrzegi
- Gmina: Wyśmierzyce
- Population: 50

Kiedrzyn [ˈkʲɛdʐɨn] is a village in the administrative district of Gmina Wyśmierzyce, within Białobrzegi County, Masovian Voivodeship, in east-central Poland.
