= Kamień, Białobrzegi County =

Kamień
- Village
- Location within Poland
- Coordinates: 51°36′23″N 20°59′14″E
- Country: Poland
- Voivodeship: Masovian
- County: Białobrzegi
- Gmina: Białobrzegi
- Population: 290

Kamień (Polish pronunciation: [ˈkamjɛj̃]) is a village in the administrative district of Gmina Białobrzegi, within Białobrzegi County, Masovian Voivodeship, in east-central Poland.
