= Dąbrówka, Białobrzegi County =

Dąbrówka
- Village
- Location within Poland
- Coordinates: 51°36′12″N 20°56′0″E
- Country: Poland
- Voivodeship: Masovian
- County: Białobrzegi
- Gmina: Białobrzegi
- Population: 67

Dąbrówka [dɔmˈbrufka] is a village in the administrative district of Gmina Białobrzegi, within Białobrzegi County, Masovian Voivodeship, in east-central Poland.
