= Kolonia Brzeźce =

- Settlement
- Location within Poland
- Coordinates: 51°39′53″N 20°59′45″E
- Country: Poland
- Voivodeship: Masovian
- County: Białobrzegi
- Gmina: Białobrzegi

Kolonia Brzeźce [kɔˈlɔɲa ˈbʐɛɕt͡sɛ] is a settlement in the administrative district of Gmina Białobrzegi, within Białobrzegi County, Masovian Voivodeship, in east-central Poland.
