= Łępin =

- Village
- Location within Poland
- Coordinates: 51°30′58″N 20°58′1″E
- Country: Poland
- Voivodeship: Masovian
- County: Białobrzegi
- Gmina: Stara Błotnica
- Population: 148

Łępin [ˈwɛmpin] is a village in the administrative district of Gmina Stara Błotnica, within Białobrzegi County, Masovian Voivodeship, in east-central Poland.
