= Nowy Gózd =

- Village
- Location within Poland
- Coordinates: 51°33′42″N 21°1′33″E
- Country: Poland
- Voivodeship: Masovian
- County: Białobrzegi
- Gmina: Stara Błotnica

Nowy Gózd [ˈnɔvɨ ˈɡust] is a village in the administrative district of Gmina Stara Błotnica, within Białobrzegi County, Masovian Voivodeship, in east-central Poland.
