= Adamów, Białobrzegi County =

Adamów
- Village
- Location within Poland
- Coordinates: 51°40′11″N 20°54′33″E
- Country: Poland
- Voivodeship: Masovian
- County: Białobrzegi
- Gmina: Promna

Adamów (Polish pronunciation: [aˈdamuf]) is a village in the administrative district of Gmina Promna, within Białobrzegi County, Masovian Voivodeship, in east-central Poland.
