= Suski Młynek =

- Village
- Location within Poland
- Coordinates: 51°36′50″N 20°55′47″E
- Country: Poland
- Voivodeship: Masovian
- County: Białobrzegi
- Gmina: Białobrzegi

Suski Młynek (Polish pronunciation: [ˈsuskʲi ˈmwɨnɛk]) is a village in the administrative district of Gmina Białobrzegi, within Białobrzegi County, Masovian Voivodeship, in east-central Poland.
