= Lisów =

Lisów may refer to the following places:

- Lisów, Lublin Voivodeship (east Poland)
- Lisów, Subcarpathian Voivodeship (south-east Poland)
- Lisów, Kielce County in Świętokrzyskie Voivodeship (south-central Poland)
- Lisów, Opatów County in Świętokrzyskie Voivodeship (south-central Poland)
- Lisów, Białobrzegi County in Masovian Voivodeship (east-central Poland)
- Lisów, Radom County in Masovian Voivodeship (east-central Poland)
- Lisów, Silesian Voivodeship (south Poland)
- Lisów, Lubusz Voivodeship (west Poland)
- Lisów, Warmian-Masurian Voivodeship (north Poland)
