= Lekarcice Stare =

- Village
- Location within Poland
- Coordinates: 51°43′22″N 20°54′40″E
- Country: Poland
- Voivodeship: Masovian
- County: Białobrzegi
- Gmina: Promna

Lekarcice Stare [lɛkarˈt͡ɕit͡sɛ ˈstarɛ] is a village in the administrative district of Gmina Promna, within Białobrzegi County, Masovian Voivodeship, in east-central Poland.
