= Trzęsów =

Trzęsów may refer to the following places in Poland:

- Trzęsów, Lower Silesian Voivodeship (south-west Poland)
- Trzęsów, Greater Poland Voivodeship (west-central Poland)
