= Redlin =

- Village
- Location within Poland
- Coordinates: 51°38′9″N 20°51′38″E
- Country: Poland
- Voivodeship: Masovian
- County: Białobrzegi
- Gmina: Wyśmierzyce
- Population: 90

Redlin [ˈrɛdlin] is a village in the administrative district of Gmina Wyśmierzyce, within Białobrzegi County, Masovian Voivodeship, in east-central Poland.
