= Piotrów, Białobrzegi County =

Piotrów
- Village
- Location within Poland
- Coordinates: 51°42′53″N 20°59′15″E
- Country: Poland
- Voivodeship: Masovian
- County: Białobrzegi
- Gmina: Promna

Piotrów [ˈpjɔtruf] is a village in the administrative district of Gmina Promna, within Białobrzegi County, Masovian Voivodeship, in east-central Poland.
