= Ryki (disambiguation) =

Ryki may refer to the following places:

- Ryki in Lublin Voivodeship (east Poland)
- Ryki, Masovian Voivodeship (east-central Poland)
- Ryki, Pomeranian Voivodeship (north Poland)
