= Stary Kadłubek =

- Village
- Location within Poland
- Coordinates: 51°35′8″N 21°3′52″E
- Country: Poland
- Voivodeship: Masovian
- County: Białobrzegi
- Gmina: Stara Błotnica
- Population: 180

Stary Kadłubek [ˈstarɨ kadˈwubɛk] is a village in the administrative district of Gmina Stara Błotnica, within Białobrzegi County, Masovian Voivodeship, in east-central Poland.
