= Leopoldów, Białobrzegi County =

Leopoldów
- Village
- Location within Poland
- Coordinates: 51°37′15″N 21°1′38″E
- Country: Poland
- Voivodeship: Masovian
- County: Białobrzegi
- Gmina: Białobrzegi

Leopoldów [lɛɔˈpɔlduf] is a village in the administrative district of Gmina Białobrzegi, within Białobrzegi County, Masovian Voivodeship, in east-central Poland.
