= Promna-Kolonia =

- Village
- Location within Poland
- Coordinates: 51°41′40″N 20°55′39″E
- Country: Poland
- Voivodeship: Masovian
- County: Białobrzegi
- Gmina: Promna

Promna-Kolonia [ˈprɔmna kɔˈlɔɲa] is a village in the administrative district of Gmina Promna, within Białobrzegi County, Masovian Voivodeship, in east-central Poland.
