= Okrąglik, Masovian Voivodeship =

Okrąglik
- Village
- Location within Poland
- Coordinates: 51°38′8″N 21°2′8″E
- Country: Poland
- Voivodeship: Masovian
- County: Białobrzegi
- Gmina: Białobrzegi
- Population: 120

Okrąglik [ɔˈkrɔŋɡlik] is a village in the administrative district of Gmina Białobrzegi, within Białobrzegi County, Masovian Voivodeship, in east-central Poland.
