= Szczyty, Masovian Voivodeship =

Szczyty
- Village
- Location within Poland
- Coordinates: 51°38′33″N 21°0′36″E
- Country: Poland
- Voivodeship: Masovian
- County: Białobrzegi
- Gmina: Białobrzegi
- Population: 320

Szczyty [ˈʂt͡ʂɨtɨ] is a village in the administrative district of Gmina Białobrzegi, within Białobrzegi County, Masovian Voivodeship, in east-central Poland.
