= Mała Wysoka, Masovian Voivodeship =

Mała Wysoka
- Village
- Location within Poland
- Coordinates: 51°41′09″N 20°50′22″E
- Country: Poland
- Voivodeship: Masovian
- County: Białobrzegi
- Gmina: Promna

Mała Wysoka [ˈmawa vɨˈsɔka] is a village in the administrative district of Gmina Promna, within Białobrzegi County, Masovian Voivodeship, in east-central Poland.
