= Olszowe, Masovian Voivodeship =

Olszowe
- Village
- Location within Poland
- Coordinates: 51°35′N 20°45′E
- Country: Poland
- Voivodeship: Masovian
- County: Białobrzegi
- Gmina: Wyśmierzyce
- Population: 90

Olszowe [ɔlˈʂɔvɛ] is a village in the administrative district of Gmina Wyśmierzyce, within Białobrzegi County, Masovian Voivodeship, in east-central Poland.
