= Żabia Wola, Białobrzegi County =

Żabia Wola
- Village
- Location within Poland
- Coordinates: 51°31′N 21°0′E
- Country: Poland
- Voivodeship: Masovian
- County: Białobrzegi
- Gmina: Stara Błotnica

Żabia Wola [ˈʐabja ˈvɔla] is a village in the administrative district of Gmina Stara Błotnica, within Białobrzegi County, Masovian Voivodeship, in east-central Poland.
