= Budy Brankowskie =

- Village
- Location within Poland
- Coordinates: 51°42′N 21°2′E
- Country: Poland
- Voivodeship: Masovian
- County: Białobrzegi
- Gmina: Białobrzegi

Budy Brankowskie [ˈbudɨ branˈkɔfskʲɛ] is a village in the administrative district of Gmina Białobrzegi, within Białobrzegi County, Masovian Voivodeship, in east-central Poland.
