= Czyżówka, Masovian Voivodeship =

Czyżówka
- Village
- Location within Poland
- Coordinates: 51°32′22″N 20°59′34″E
- Country: Poland
- Voivodeship: Masovian
- County: Białobrzegi
- Gmina: Stara Błotnica
- Population (approx.): 250

Czyżówka [t͡ʂɨˈʐufka] is a village in the administrative district of Gmina Stara Błotnica, within Białobrzegi County, Masovian Voivodeship, in east-central Poland.
