= Zamłynie, Masovian Voivodeship =

Zamłynie
- Settlement
- Location within Poland
- Coordinates: 51°34′33″N 20°55′27″E
- Country: Poland
- Voivodeship: Masovian
- County: Białobrzegi
- Gmina: Stara Błotnica

Zamłynie [zamˈwɨɲɛ] is a settlement in the administrative district of Gmina Stara Błotnica, within Białobrzegi County, Masovian Voivodeship, in east-central Poland.
