= Paprotno, Masovian Voivodeship =

Paprotno
- Village
- Location within Poland
- Coordinates: 51°36′N 20°49′E
- Country: Poland
- Voivodeship: Masovian
- County: Białobrzegi
- Gmina: Wyśmierzyce

Paprotno [paˈprɔtnɔ] is a village in the administrative district of Gmina Wyśmierzyce, within Białobrzegi County, Masovian Voivodeship, in east-central Poland.
