= Jasionna, Masovian Voivodeship =

Jasionna
- Village
- Location within Poland
- Coordinates: 51°37′9″N 20°54′26″E
- Country: Poland
- Voivodeship: Masovian
- County: Białobrzegi
- Gmina: Białobrzegi
- Population: 130

Jasionna [jaˈɕɔnna] is a village in the administrative district of Gmina Białobrzegi, within Białobrzegi County, Masovian Voivodeship, in east-central Poland.
