= Osuchów, Białobrzegi County =

Osuchów
- Village
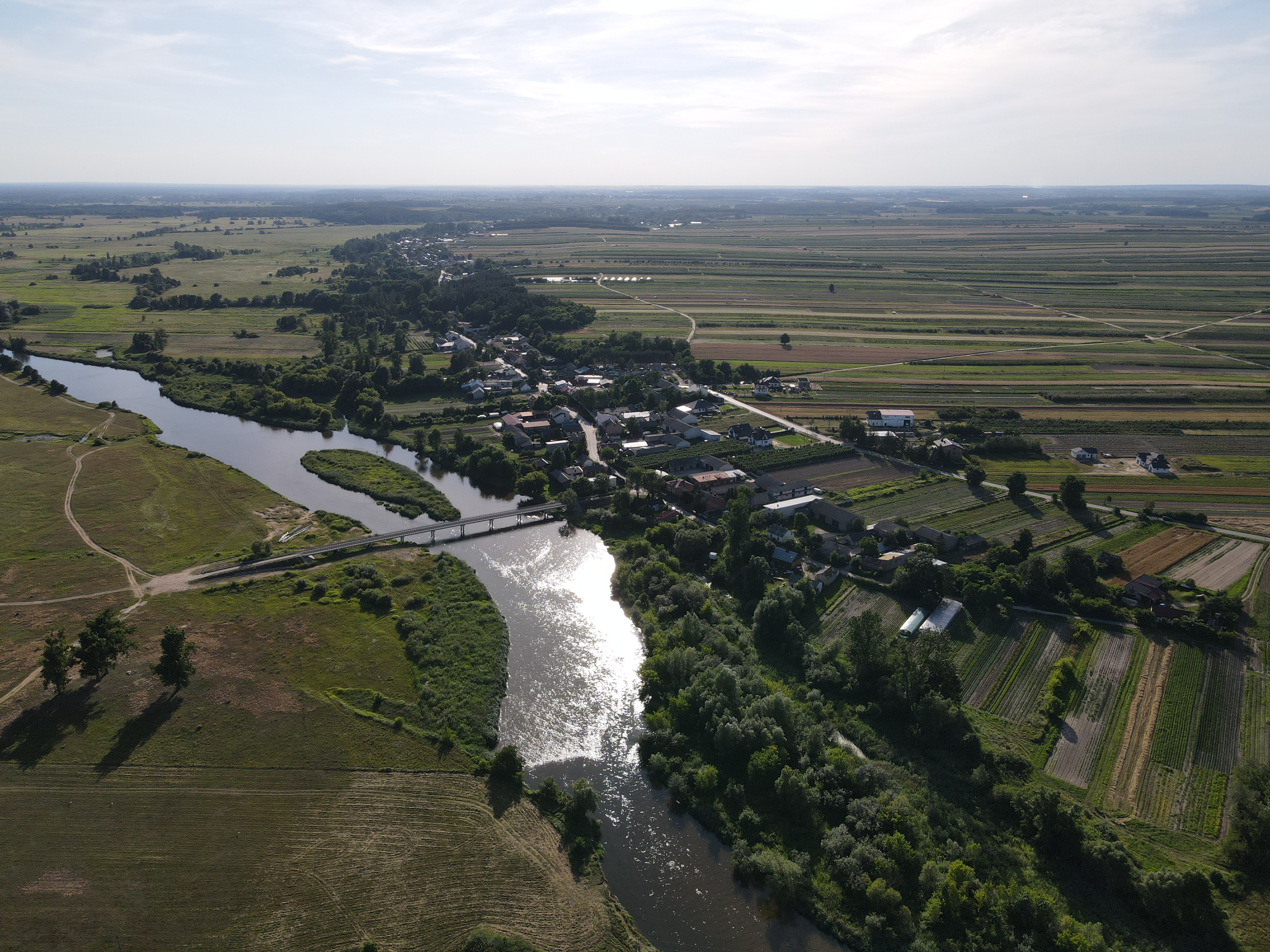

- Location within Poland
- Coordinates: 51°40′N 20°50′E
- Country: Poland
- Voivodeship: Masovian
- County: Białobrzegi
- Gmina: Promna

Osuchów [ɔˈsuxuf] is a village in the administrative district of Gmina Promna, within Białobrzegi County, Masovian Voivodeship, in east-central Poland.
