= Kożuchów (disambiguation) =

Kożuchów may refer to the following places:

- Kożuchów in Lubusz Voivodeship (west Poland)
- Kożuchów, Białobrzegi County in Masovian Voivodeship (east-central Poland)
- Kożuchów, Subcarpathian Voivodeship (south-east Poland)
- Kożuchów, Sokołów County in Masovian Voivodeship (east-central Poland)
