= Olszamy =

- Village
- Location within Poland
- Coordinates: 51°45′N 20°57′E
- Country: Poland
- Voivodeship: Masovian
- County: Białobrzegi
- Gmina: Promna

Olszamy [ɔlˈʂamɨ] is a village in the administrative district of Gmina Promna, within Białobrzegi County, Masovian Voivodeship, in east-central Poland.
