= Gajówka Jastrzębia =

- Village
- Location within Poland
- Coordinates: 51°41′18″N 20°47′19″E
- Country: Poland
- Voivodeship: Masovian
- County: Białobrzegi
- Gmina: Promna

Gajówka Jastrzębia [ɡaˈjufka jasˈtʂɛmbja] is a village in the administrative district of Gmina Promna, within Białobrzegi County, Masovian Voivodeship, in east-central Poland.
