= Wola Branecka =

- Village
- Location within Poland
- Coordinates: 51°42′31″N 21°00′24″E
- Country: Poland
- Voivodeship: Masovian
- County: Białobrzegi
- Gmina: Promna

Wola Branecka [ˈvɔla braˈnɛt͡ska] is a village in the administrative district of Gmina Promna, within Białobrzegi County, Masovian Voivodeship, in east-central Poland.
