= Górki, Białobrzegi County =

Górki
- Village
- Location within Poland
- Coordinates: 51°37′11″N 20°46′0″E
- Country: Poland
- Voivodeship: Masovian
- County: Białobrzegi
- Gmina: Wyśmierzyce
- Population: 40

Górki [ˈɡurki] is a village in the administrative district of Gmina Wyśmierzyce, within Białobrzegi County, Masovian Voivodeship, in east-central Poland.
