= Daniel, Greater Poland Voivodeship =

Daniel
- Village
- Location within Poland
- Coordinates: 51°39′23″N 18°17′13″E
- Country: Poland
- Voivodeship: Greater Poland
- Powiat: Kaliszshire
- Gmina: Szczytniki
- Population: 40

Daniel [ˈdaɲɛl] is a part of Pośrednik village in the administrative district of Gmina Szczytniki, within Kalisz County, Greater Poland Voivodeship, in west-central Poland.
