= Przybyszew, Masovian Voivodeship =

Przybyszew
- Village
- Location within Poland
- Coordinates: 51°39′49″N 20°51′19″E
- Country: Poland
- Voivodeship: Masovian
- County: Białobrzegi
- Gmina: Promna
- Population: 780

Przybyszew [pʂɨˈbɨʂɛf] is a village in the administrative district of Gmina Promna, within Białobrzegi County, Masovian Voivodeship, in east-central Poland.
