= Sielce (disambiguation) =

Sielce is a part of the Mokotów district of Warsaw, Poland.

Sielce may also refer to:

- Sielce, Lublin Voivodeship (east Poland)
- Sielce, Gmina Promna in Masovian Voivodeship (east-central Poland)
- Sielce, Gmina Stromiec in Masovian Voivodeship (east-central Poland)
- Sielce, Gostynin County in Masovian Voivodeship (central Poland)
- Sielce, Polish name for Seltsy, Ryazan Oblast, Russia
