= Brodek =

- Village
- Location within Poland
- Coordinates: 51°35′15″N 20°49′36″E
- Country: Poland
- Voivodeship: Masovian
- County: Białobrzegi
- Gmina: Wyśmierzyce
- Population: 30

Brodek [ˈbrɔdɛk] is a village in the administrative district of Gmina Wyśmierzyce, within Białobrzegi County, Masovian Voivodeship, in east-central Poland.
