= Korzeń, Masovian Voivodeship =

Korzeń
- Village
- Location within Poland
- Coordinates: 51°38′28″N 20°52′42″E
- Country: Poland
- Voivodeship: Masovian
- County: Białobrzegi
- Gmina: Wyśmierzyce
- Population: 130

Korzeń (Polish pronunciation: [ˈkɔʐɛj̃]) is a village in the administrative district of Gmina Wyśmierzyce, within Białobrzegi County, Masovian Voivodeship, in east-central Poland.
