= Brzeska Wola =

- Village
- Location within Poland
- Coordinates: 51°36′51″N 21°1′16″E
- Country: Poland
- Voivodeship: Masovian
- County: Białobrzegi
- Gmina: Białobrzegi
- Population: 170

Brzeska Wola [ˈbʐɛska ˈvɔla] is a village in the administrative district of Gmina Białobrzegi, within Białobrzegi County, Masovian Voivodeship, in east-central Poland.
