= Kostrzyn, Masovian Voivodeship =

Kostrzyn
- Village
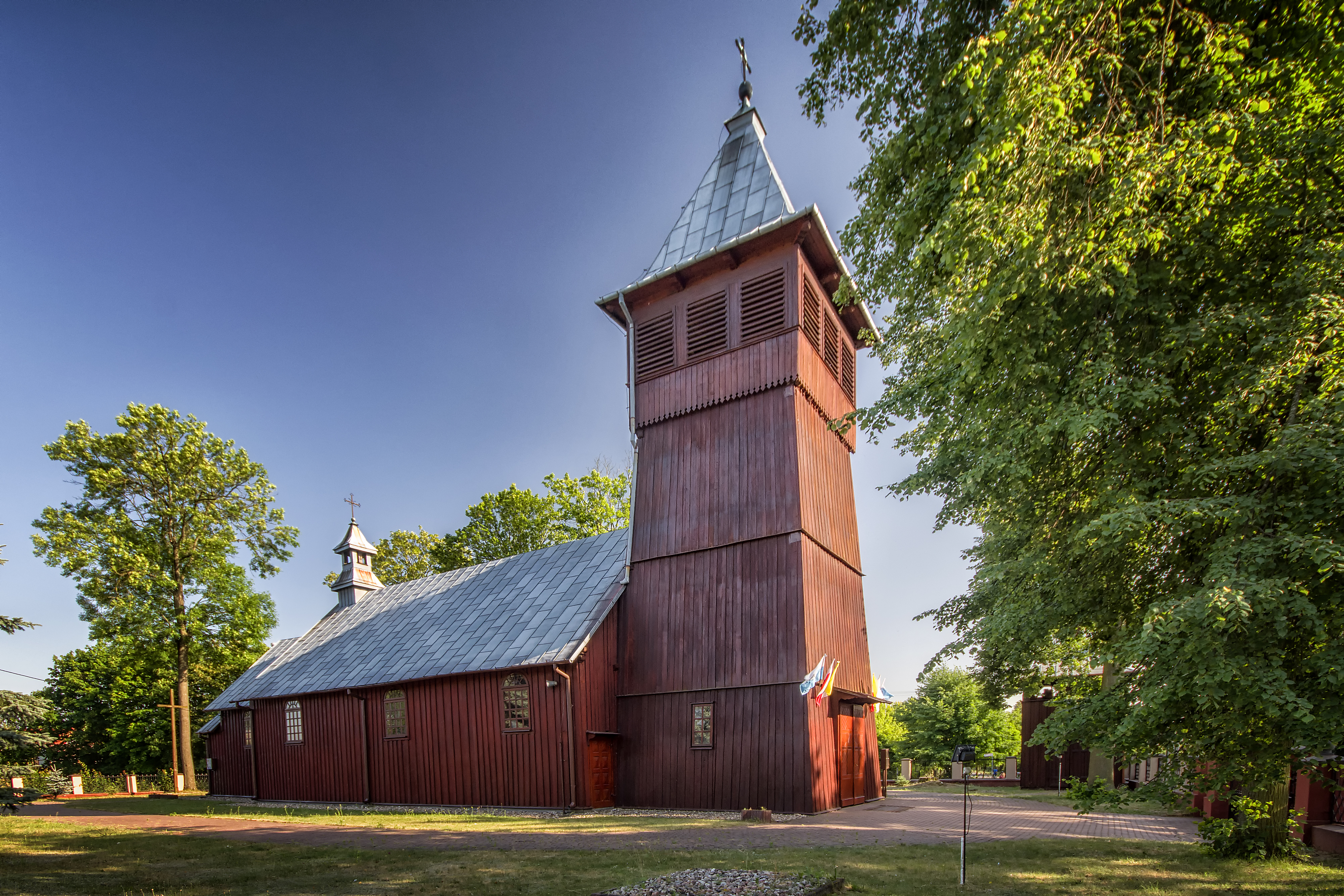
- Saint Stanislaus church in Kostrzyn

- Location within Poland
- Coordinates: 51°33′0″N 20°39′30″E
- Country: Poland
- Voivodeship: Masovian
- County: Białobrzegi
- Gmina: Wyśmierzyce
- Population: 300
- Time zone: UTC+1 (CET)
  - Summer (DST): UTC+2 (CEST)
- Vehicle registration: WBR

Kostrzyn [ˈkɔstʂɨn] is a village in the administrative district of Gmina Wyśmierzyce, within Białobrzegi County, Masovian Voivodeship, in east-central Poland.

== History ==
Kostrzyn was a private village of Polish nobility, administratively located in the Radom County in the Sandomierz Voivodeship in the Lesser Poland Province. In 1827, the village had a population of 85.
