= Pelinów, Białobrzegi County =

Pelinów
- Village
- Location within Poland
- Coordinates: 51°44′52″N 20°56′47″E
- Country: Poland
- Voivodeship: Masovian
- County: Białobrzegi
- Gmina: Promna

Pelinów [pɛˈlinuf] is a village in the administrative district of Gmina Promna, within Białobrzegi County, Masovian Voivodeship, in east-central Poland.
