= Mikówka =

- Village
- Location within Poland
- Coordinates: 51°37′N 20°59′E
- Country: Poland
- Voivodeship: Masovian
- County: Białobrzegi
- Gmina: Białobrzegi
- Population: 140

Mikówka [miˈkufka] is a village in the administrative district of Gmina Białobrzegi, within Białobrzegi County, Masovian Voivodeship, in east-central Poland.
