= Cupel =

Cupel may refer to:

- A porous pot used in cupellation
- Cupel, Białobrzegi County in Masovian Voivodeship (east-central Poland)
- Cupel, Legionowo County in Masovian Voivodeship (east-central Poland)
- Cupel, Ostrołęka County in Masovian Voivodeship (east-central Poland)
