= Grodzisko, Masovian Voivodeship =

Grodzisko
- Village
- Location within Poland
- Coordinates: 51°34′19″N 21°4′21″E
- Country: Poland
- Voivodeship: Masovian
- County: Białobrzegi
- Gmina: Stara Błotnica
- Population: 300

Grodzisko [ɡrɔˈd͡ʑiskɔ] is a village in the administrative district of Gmina Stara Błotnica, within Białobrzegi County, Masovian Voivodeship, in east-central Poland.
