= Wojciechówka, Gmina Promna =

Wojciechówka
- Village
- Location within Poland
- Coordinates: 51°42′08″N 21°58′29″E
- Country: Poland
- Voivodeship: Masovian
- County: Białobrzegi
- Gmina: Promna

Wojciechówka (Polish pronunciation: [vɔjt͡ɕɛˈxufka]) is a village in the administrative district of Gmina Promna, within Białobrzegi County, Masovian Voivodeship, in east-central Poland.
