= Nowy Kadłubek =

- Village
- Location within Poland
- Coordinates: 51°35′28″N 21°04′53″E
- Country: Poland
- Voivodeship: Masovian
- County: Białobrzegi
- Gmina: Stara Błotnica

Nowy Kadłubek [ˈnɔvɨ kadˈwubɛk] is a village in the administrative district of Gmina Stara Błotnica, within Białobrzegi County, Masovian Voivodeship, in east-central Poland.
