= Kozłów, Gmina Wyśmierzyce =

Kozłów
- Village
- Location within Poland
- Coordinates: 51°35′12″N 20°44′10″E
- Country: Poland
- Voivodeship: Masovian
- County: Białobrzegi
- Gmina: Wyśmierzyce

Kozłów [ˈkɔzwuf] is a village in the administrative district of Gmina Wyśmierzyce, within Białobrzegi County, Masovian Voivodeship, in east-central Poland.
