= Brzeźce, Masovian Voivodeship =

Brzeźce
- Village
- Location within Poland
- Coordinates: 51°40′19″N 21°0′14″E
- Country: Poland
- Voivodeship: Masovian
- County: Białobrzegi
- Gmina: Białobrzegi
- Population: 220

Brzeźce [ˈbʐɛɕt͡sɛ] is a village in the administrative district of Gmina Białobrzegi, within Białobrzegi County, Masovian Voivodeship, in east-central Poland.
