= Falęcice-Wola =

- Village
- Location within Poland
- Coordinates: 51°40′17″N 20°56′9″E
- Country: Poland
- Voivodeship: Masovian
- County: Białobrzegi
- Gmina: Promna

Falęcice-Wola [falɛnˈt͡ɕit͡sɛ ˈvɔla] is a village in the administrative district of Gmina Promna, within Białobrzegi County, Masovian Voivodeship, in east-central Poland.
