= Falęcice-Parcela =

- Village
- Location within Poland
- Coordinates: 51°43′N 20°54′E
- Country: Poland
- Voivodeship: Masovian
- County: Białobrzegi
- Gmina: Promna

Falęcice-Parcela [falɛnˈt͡ɕit͡sɛ parˈt͡sɛla] is a village in the administrative district of Gmina Promna, within Białobrzegi County, Masovian Voivodeship, in east-central Poland.
