= Bronisławów, Białobrzegi County =

Bronisławów
- Village
- Location within Poland
- Coordinates: 51°43′30″N 20°59′4″E
- Country: Poland
- Voivodeship: Masovian
- County: Białobrzegi
- Gmina: Promna

Bronisławów [brɔniˈswavuf] is a village in the administrative district of Gmina Promna, within Białobrzegi County, Masovian Voivodeship, in east-central Poland.
