= Pohulanka, Masovian Voivodeship =

Pohulanka
- Village
- Location within Poland
- Coordinates: 51°39′N 21°3′E
- Country: Poland
- Voivodeship: Masovian
- County: Białobrzegi
- Gmina: Białobrzegi

Pohulanka [pɔxuˈlaŋka] is a village in the administrative district of Gmina Białobrzegi, within Białobrzegi County, Masovian Voivodeship, in east-central Poland.
