= Șopot =

Șopot may refer to following rivers in Romania:

- Șopot (Bega), a tributary of the Bega in Timiș County
- Șopot (Olt), a tributary of the Olt in the city of Slatina, Olt County
- Șopot (Valea Mare), a tributary of the Valea Mare in Timiș County

== See also ==
- Șopotu, a tributary of the Nera in Caraș-Severin County, Romania
- Sopot (river), a tributary of the Tanew, Poland
- Sopot (disambiguation)
- Šopot, a village in the city of Benkovac, Croatia
