= Joanka, Kalisz County =

Joanka
- Village
- Location within Poland
- Coordinates: 51°37′57″N 18°20′57″E
- Country: Poland
- Voivodeship: Greater Poland
- County: Kalisz
- Gmina: Szczytniki

Joanka [jɔˈanka] is a village in the administrative district of Gmina Szczytniki, within Kalisz County, Greater Poland Voivodeship, in west-central Poland.
