= Tymieniec-Dwór =

- Village
- Location within Poland
- Coordinates: 51°43′49″N 18°22′55″E
- Country: Poland
- Voivodeship: Greater Poland
- County: Kalisz
- Gmina: Szczytniki

Tymieniec-Dwór [tɨˈmjɛɲɛt͡s ˈdvur] is a village in the administrative district of Gmina Szczytniki, within Kalisz County, Greater Poland Voivodeship, in west-central Poland.
