= Włodzimierz, Greater Poland Voivodeship =

Włodzimierz
- Village
- Location within Poland
- Coordinates: 51°40′2″N 18°16′5″E
- Country: Poland
- Voivodeship: Greater Poland
- County: Kalisz
- Gmina: Szczytniki
- Population: 110

Włodzimierz [vwɔˈd͡ʑimjɛʂ] is a village in the administrative district of Gmina Szczytniki, within Kalisz County, Greater Poland Voivodeship, in west-central Poland.
