= Borek, Gmina Szczytniki =

Borek
- Village
- Location within Poland
- Coordinates: 51°39′35″N 18°16′48″E
- Country: Poland
- Voivodeship: Greater Poland
- County: Kalisz
- Gmina: Szczytniki

Borek [ˈbɔrɛk] is a village in the administrative district of Gmina Szczytniki, within Kalisz County, Greater Poland Voivodeship, in west-central Poland.
