= Wyśmierzyce =

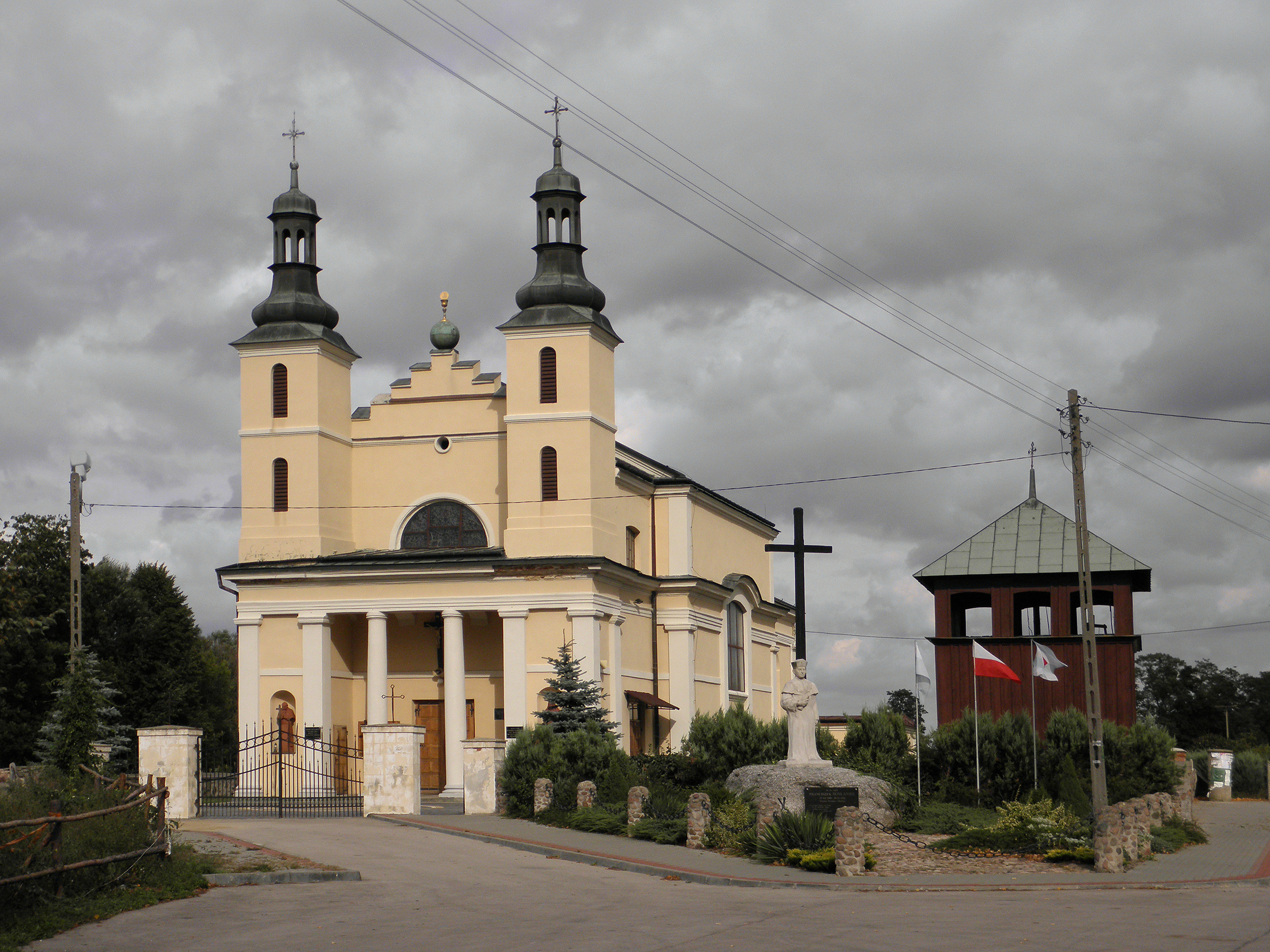
- Church of Saint Theresa of Ávila

- Coat of arms

- Location within Poland
- Coordinates: 51°37′25″N 20°49′12″E
- Country: Poland
- Voivodeship: Masovian
- County: Białobrzegi
- Gmina: Wyśmierzyce
- Established: fourteenth century
- Town rights: 1338-1870, 1922

Government
  - Mayor: Marek Bielewski

Area
  - Total: 16.56 km^{2} (6.39 sq mi)

Population (2015)
  - Total: 920
  - Density: 54.6/km^{2} (141/sq mi)
- Time zone: UTC+1 (CET)
  - Summer (DST): UTC+2 (CEST)
- Postal code: 26-811
- Area code: +48 48
- Car plates: WBR
- Website: Wyśmierzyce.pl

Wyśmierzyce [vɨɕmjɛˈʐɨt͡sɛ] is a town in Białobrzegi County, Masovian Voivodeship, Poland, with 884 inhabitants (2004). Until 2017 it was the smallest town in Poland.

It lies along National Road Nr. 48, on the right, southern bank of the Pilica River. Historically Wyśmierzyce belongs to the region of Mazovia, and is located close to its border with Lesser Poland. The area of the town is approximately 16.84 km^{2} (6.50 sq mi).

== History ==
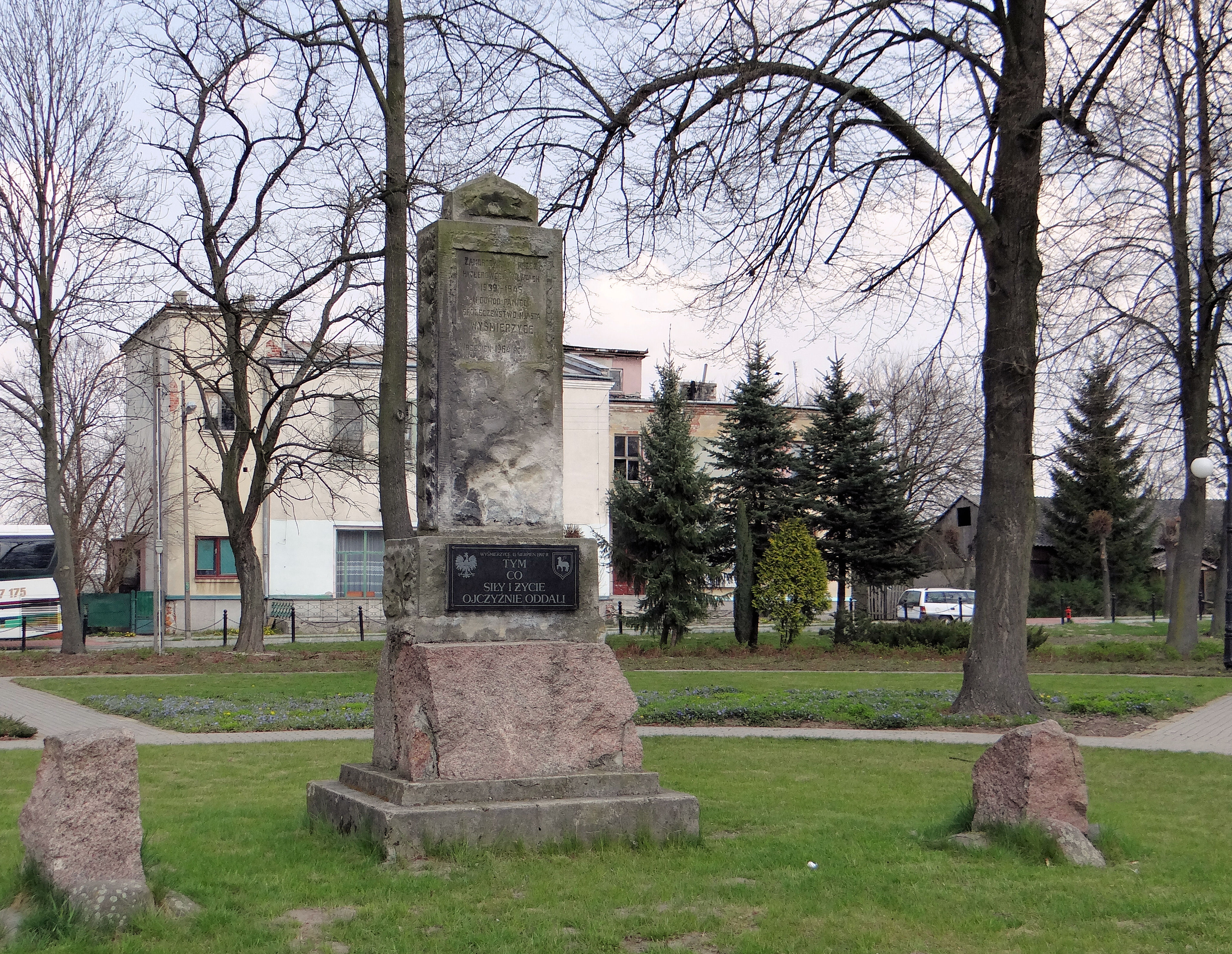
World War II memorial

Until the late 17th century, the name of the town was spelled Wyszemierzyce (also Vyszemierzice and Wyssemierzyce). The name comes from a male given name Wyszemir. Wyśmierzyce was granted Magdeburg rights on December 12, 1338. In 1378, first Roman Catholic parish was opened here, and in 1657, the town was completely destroyed by the army of Transilvanian prince George II Rakoczi during the Swedish Invasion of Poland. The town was administratively located in the Warka County in the Masovian Voivodeship in the Greater Poland Province of the Kingdom of Poland, however by the 18th century it was transferred to the Sandomierz Voivodeship in the Lesser Poland Province.

Following the Third Partition of Poland, in 1795, it fell to Austria, within which it was administratively part of so-called West Galicia. It was regained by Poles following the Austro–Polish War of 1809, and included within the short-lived Duchy of Warsaw. Following the duchy's dissolution, the town fell to Russian-controlled Congress Poland, from 1844 on as part of Radom Governorate. In 1869, it was one of many towns stripped of its town rights by the Russian administration as a punishment for the unsuccessful Polish January Uprising of 1863–1864. After World War I, in 1918, Poland regained independence and control of Wyśmierzyce. In 1922, town rights were restored. Within the interwar Second Polish Republic it was administratively part of the Kielce Voivodeship.

Between 1973 and 2017 Wyśmierzyce was the smallest town in Poland. It ceased to be the smallest town when Wiślica, with a population of 503 (population in 2016), regained its city rights on 1 January 2018.

== Notable people ==
- Andrzej Konopka (born 1969), Polish actor
