= Ryki, Masovian Voivodeship =

Ryki
- Village
- Location within Poland
- Coordinates: 51°33′37″N 20°56′43″E
- Country: Poland
- Voivodeship: Masovian
- County: Białobrzegi
- Gmina: Stara Błotnica

Ryki [ˈrɨki] is a village in the administrative district of Gmina Stara Błotnica, within Białobrzegi County, Masovian Voivodeship, in east-central Poland.
