= Nowy Kobylnik =

- Village
- Location within Poland
- Coordinates: 51°31′30″N 21°1′9″E
- Country: Poland
- Voivodeship: Masovian
- County: Białobrzegi
- Gmina: Stara Błotnica

Nowy Kobylnik [ˈnɔvɨ kɔˈbɨlnik] is a village in the administrative district of Gmina Stara Błotnica, within Białobrzegi County, Masovian Voivodeship, in east-central Poland.
