= Górki, Kalisz County =

Górki
- Village
- Location within Poland
- Coordinates: 51°39′00″N 18°19′18″E
- Country: Poland
- Voivodeship: Greater Poland
- County: Kalisz
- Gmina: Szczytniki

Górki [ˈɡurki] is a village in the administrative district of Gmina Szczytniki, within Kalisz County, Greater Poland Voivodeship, in west-central Poland.
