= Stara Błotnica =

- Village
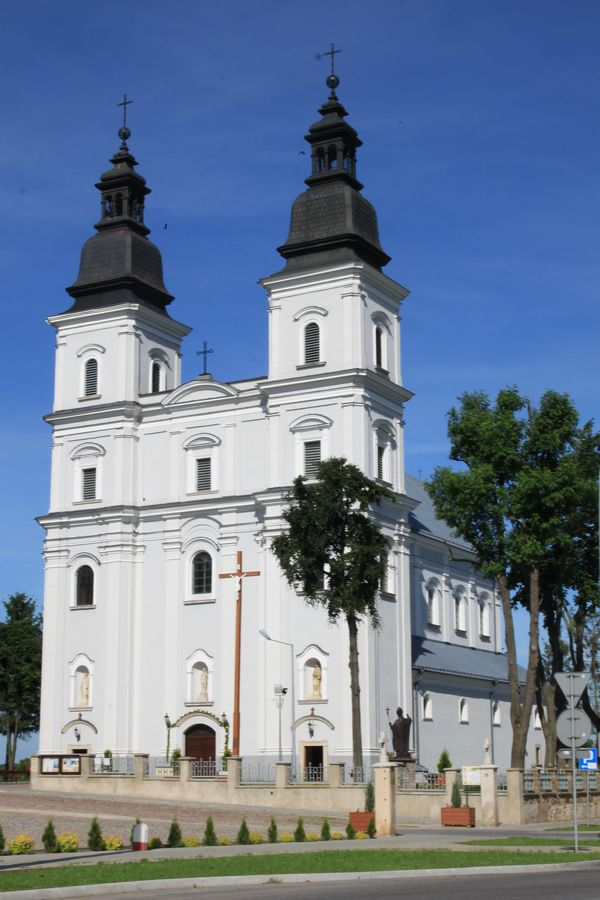
- Church of the Nativity of the Virgin Mary

- Location within Poland
- Coordinates: 51°33′N 20°59′E
- Country: Poland
- Voivodeship: Masovian
- County: Białobrzegi
- Gmina: Stara Błotnica
- Time zone: UTC+1 (CET)
  - Summer (DST): UTC+2 (CEST)

Stara Błotnica [ˈstara bwɔtˈnit͡sa] is a village in Białobrzegi County, Masovian Voivodeship, in east-central Poland. It is the seat of the gmina (administrative district) called Stara Błotnica.

Eight Polish citizens were murdered by Nazi Germany in the village during World War II.
