= Lipka, Kalisz County =

Lipka
- Village
- Location within Poland
- Coordinates: 51°42′28″N 18°23′29″E
- Country: Poland
- Voivodeship: Greater Poland
- County: Kalisz
- Gmina: Szczytniki
- Population: 220

Lipka [ˈlipka] is a village in the administrative district of Gmina Szczytniki, within Kalisz County, Greater Poland Voivodeship, in west-central Poland.
