= Korzekwin =

- Village
- Location within Poland
- Coordinates: 51°40′N 18°20′E
- Country: Poland
- Voivodeship: Greater Poland
- County: Kalisz
- Gmina: Szczytniki

Korzekwin [kɔˈʐɛkfin] is a village in the administrative district of Gmina Szczytniki, within Kalisz County, Greater Poland Voivodeship, in west-central Poland.
