= Grab, Kalisz County =

Grab
- Village
- Location within Poland
- Coordinates: 51°43′34″N 18°18′54″E
- Country: Poland
- Voivodeship: Greater Poland
- County: Kalisz
- Gmina: Szczytniki

Grab [ɡrap] is a village in the administrative district of Gmina Szczytniki, within Kalisz County, Greater Poland Voivodeship, in west-central Poland.

It registered a population of 429 in the March 2021 census.
