= Gmina Białobrzegi, Masovian Voivodeship =

Gmina Białobrzegi Białobrzegi Commune
- Gmina
- Flag Coat of arms
- Interactive map of Gmina Białobrzegi
- Coordinates (Białobrzegi): 51°39′N 20°57′E
- Country: Poland
- Voivodeship: Masovian
- County: Białobrzegi
- Seat: Białobrzegi

Area
  - Total: 78.93 km^{2} (30.48 sq mi)

Population (2006)
  - Total: 10,278
  - Density: 130.2/km^{2} (337.3/sq mi)
  - Urban: 7,320
  - Rural: 2,958
- Website: http://www.bialobrzegi.pl/

Gmina Białobrzegi is an urban-rural gmina (administrative district) in Białobrzegi County, Masovian Voivodeship, in east-central Poland. Its seat is the town of Białobrzegi, which lies approximately 63 kilometres (39 mi) south of Warsaw.

The gmina covers an area of 78.93 square kilometres (30.5 sq mi), and as of 2006 its total population is 10,278 (out of which the population of Białobrzegi amounts to 7,320, and the population of the rural part of the gmina is 2,958).

== Villages ==
Apart from the town of Białobrzegi, Gmina Białobrzegi contains the villages and settlements of Brzeska Wola, Brzeźce, Budy Brankowskie, Dąbrówka, Jasionna, Kamień, Kolonia Brzeźce, Leopoldów, Mikówka, Okrąglik, Pohulanka, Stawiszyn, Sucha, Suski Młynek, Szczyty and Wojciechówka.

== Neighbouring gminas ==
Gmina Białobrzegi is bordered by the gminas of Promna, Radzanów, Stara Błotnica, Stromiec, Warka and Wyśmierzyce.
