= Stary Sopot =

- Village
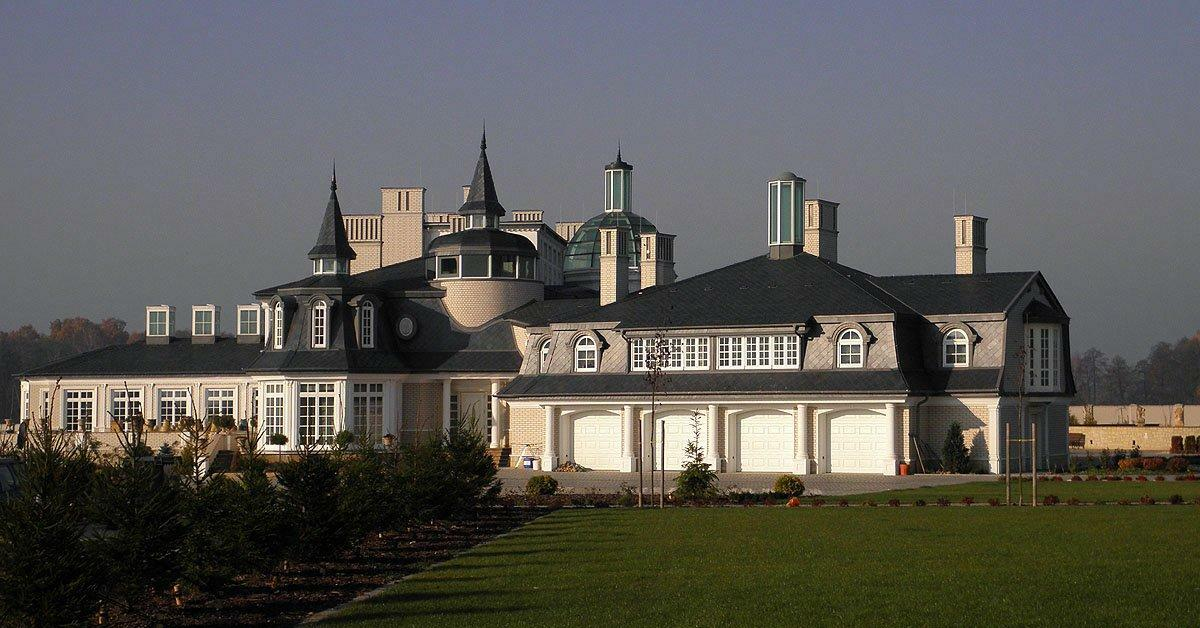

- Location within Poland
- Coordinates: 51°32′27″N 21°01′15″E
- Country: Poland
- Voivodeship: Masovian
- County: Białobrzegi
- Gmina: Stara Błotnica
- Population (approx.): 100

Stary Sopot [ˈstarɨ ˈsɔpɔt] is a village in the administrative district of Gmina Stara Błotnica, within Białobrzegi County, Masovian Voivodeship, in east-central Poland.
