= Tymieniec-Jastrząb =

- Village
- Location within Poland
- Coordinates: 51°43′37″N 18°23′10″E
- Country: Poland
- Voivodeship: Greater Poland
- County: Kalisz
- Gmina: Szczytniki

Tymieniec-Jastrząb [tɨˈmjɛɲɛt͡s ˈjastʂɔmp] is a village in the administrative district of Gmina Szczytniki, within Kalisz County, Greater Poland Voivodeship, in west-central Poland.
