= Sobiesęki Pierwsze =

- Village
- Location within Poland
- Coordinates: 51°37′41″N 18°18′56″E
- Country: Poland
- Voivodeship: Greater Poland
- County: Kalisz
- Gmina: Szczytniki

Sobiesęki Pierwsze [sɔbjɛˈsɛnki ˈpjɛrfʂɛ] is a village in the administrative district of Gmina Szczytniki, within Kalisz County, Greater Poland Voivodeship, in west-central Poland.
