= Kożuchów, Białobrzegi County =

Kożuchów
- Village
- Location within Poland
- Coordinates: 51°36′55″N 20°51′21″E
- Country: Poland
- Voivodeship: Masovian
- County: Białobrzegi
- Gmina: Wyśmierzyce
- Population: 170

Kożuchów [kɔˈʐuxuf] is a village in the administrative district of Gmina Wyśmierzyce, within Białobrzegi County, Masovian Voivodeship, in east-central Poland.
