= Staw, Kalisz County =

Staw
- Village
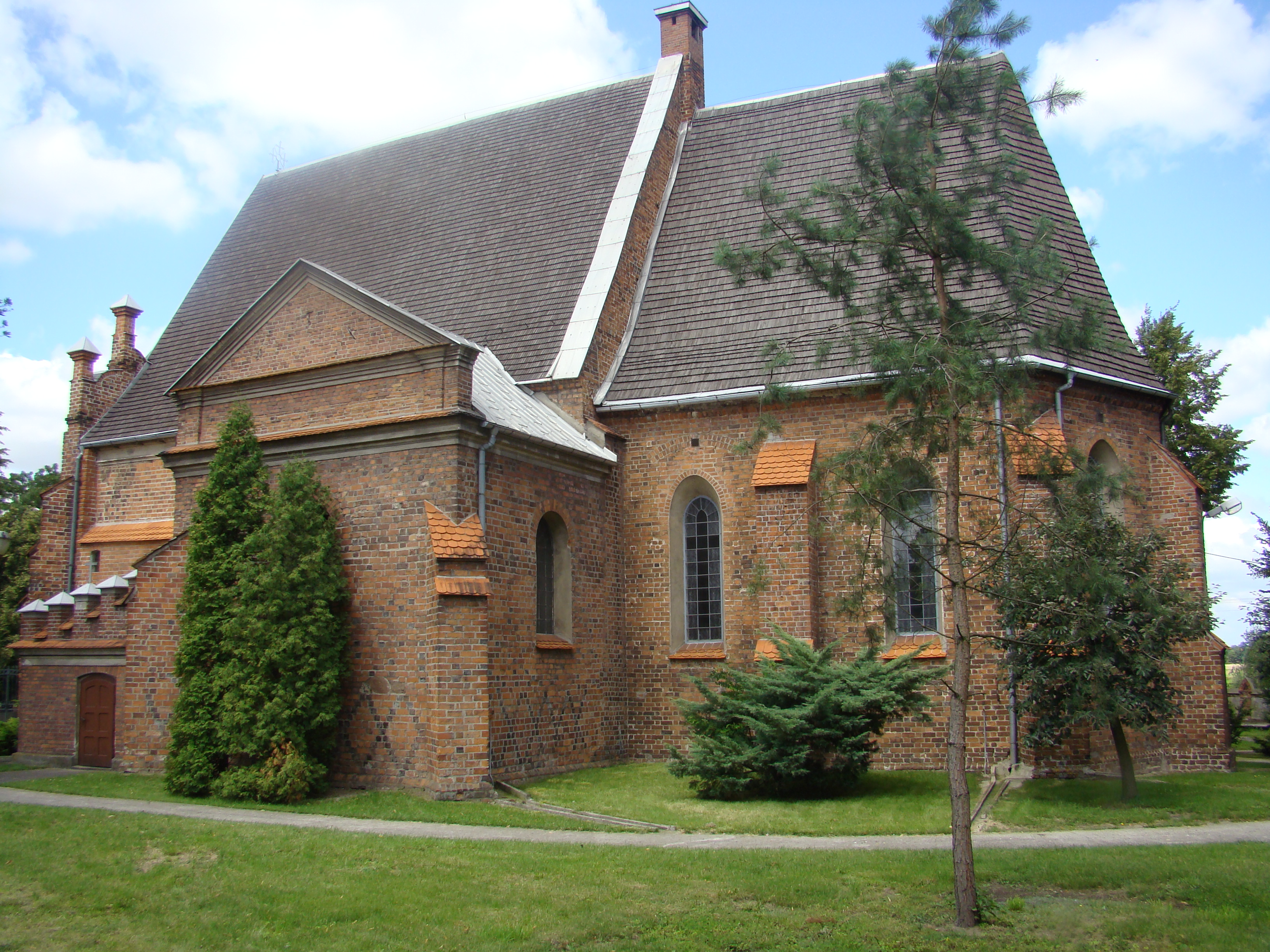
- Saint Nicholas church in Staw

- Location within Poland
- Coordinates: 51°43′N 18°23′E
- Country: Poland
- Voivodeship: Greater Poland
- County: Kalisz
- Gmina: Szczytniki

Population (approx.)
  - Total: 600
- Time zone: UTC+1 (CET)
  - Summer (DST): UTC+2 (CEST)
- Vehicle registration: PKA

Staw [staf] is a village in the administrative district of Gmina Szczytniki, within Kalisz County, Greater Poland Voivodeship, in west-central Poland. It is located in the Sieradz Land.

It was a private town, administratively located in the Sieradz County in the Sieradz Voivodeship in the Greater Poland Province of the Kingdom of Poland.
