= Kornelin, Greater Poland Voivodeship =

Kornelin
- Village
- Location within Poland
- Coordinates: 51°38′10″N 18°21′21″E
- Country: Poland
- Voivodeship: Greater Poland
- County: Kalisz
- Gmina: Szczytniki

Kornelin [kɔrˈnɛlin] is a village in the administrative district of Gmina Szczytniki, within Kalisz County, Greater Poland Voivodeship, in west-central Poland.
