= Krzywda, Białobrzegi County =

Krzywda
- Village
- Location within Poland
- Coordinates: 51°35′0″N 20°59′18″E
- Country: Poland
- Voivodeship: Masovian
- County: Białobrzegi
- Gmina: Stara Błotnica
- Population: 320

Krzywda [ˈkʂɨvda] is a village in the administrative district of Gmina Stara Błotnica, within Białobrzegi County, Masovian Voivodeship, in east-central Poland.
