= Rudunki Szczytnickie =

- Village
- Location within Poland
- Coordinates: 51°41′11″N 18°16′34″E
- Country: Poland
- Voivodeship: Greater Poland
- County: Kalisz
- Gmina: Szczytniki

Rudunki Szczytnickie [ruˈdunki ʂt͡ʂɨtˈnit͡skʲɛ] is a village in the administrative district of Gmina Szczytniki, within Kalisz County, Greater Poland Voivodeship, in west-central Poland.
