= Mroczki Wielkie =

- Village
- Location within Poland
- Coordinates: 51°44′N 18°25′E
- Country: Poland
- Voivodeship: Greater Poland
- County: Kalisz
- Gmina: Szczytniki

Mroczki Wielkie (Polish pronunciation: [ˈmrɔt͡ʂkʲi ˈvjɛlkʲɛ]) is a village in the administrative district of Gmina Szczytniki, within Kalisz County, Greater Poland Voivodeship, in west-central Poland.
