= Marcjanów, Kalisz County =

Marcjanów
- Village
- Location within Poland
- Coordinates: 51°41′N 18°17′E
- Country: Poland
- Voivodeship: Greater Poland
- County: Kalisz
- Gmina: Szczytniki

Marcjanów [mart͡sˈjanuf] is a village in the administrative district of Gmina Szczytniki, within Kalisz County, Greater Poland Voivodeship, in west-central Poland.
