= Antonin, Kalisz County =

Antonin
- Village
- Location within Poland
- Coordinates: 51°39′14″N 18°21′17″E
- Country: Poland
- Voivodeship: Greater Poland
- County: Kalisz
- Gmina: Szczytniki
- Population: 160

Antonin (Polish pronunciation: [anˈtɔɲin]) is a village in the administrative district of Gmina Szczytniki, within Kalisz County, Greater Poland Voivodeship, in west-central Poland.
