= Sobiesęki Trzecie =

- Village
- Location within Poland
- Coordinates: 51°38′15″N 18°16′33″E
- Country: Poland
- Voivodeship: Greater Poland
- County: Kalisz
- Gmina: Szczytniki

Sobiesęki Trzecie [sɔbjɛˈsɛnki ˈtʂɛt͡ɕɛ] is a village in the administrative district of Gmina Szczytniki, within Kalisz County, Greater Poland Voivodeship, in west-central Poland.
