= Kuczewola =

- Village
- Location within Poland
- Coordinates: 51°40′N 18°16′E
- Country: Poland
- Voivodeship: Greater Poland
- County: Kalisz
- Gmina: Szczytniki
- Time zone: UTC+1 (CET)
  - Summer (DST): UTC+2 (CEST)
- Vehicle registration: PKA

Kuczewola [kut͡ʂɛˈvɔla] is a village in the administrative district of Gmina Szczytniki, within Kalisz County, Greater Poland Voivodeship, in central Poland.

== History ==
As part of the region of Greater Poland, i.e. the cradle of the Polish state, the area formed part of Poland since its establishment in the 10th century. Kuczewola was a private village of Polish nobility, administratively located in the Kalisz County in the Kalisz Voivodeship in the Greater Poland Province of the Kingdom of Poland.

During the German occupation of Poland (World War II), in 1940 and 1942, the occupiers carried out expulsions of Poles, whose houses and farms were handed over to German colonists as part of the Lebensraum policy. Poles expelled in 1942 were deported to forced labour in Germany and German-annexed Austria, and a two-year-old girl died during the deportation.
