= Główczyn, Greater Poland Voivodeship =

Główczyn
- Village
- Location within Poland
- Coordinates: 51°39′11″N 18°21′33″E
- Country: Poland
- Voivodeship: Greater Poland
- County: Kalisz
- Gmina: Szczytniki

Główczyn [ˈɡwuft͡ʂɨn] is a village in the administrative district of Gmina Szczytniki, within Kalisz County, Greater Poland Voivodeship, in west-central Poland.
