= Chojno, Kalisz County =

Chojno
- Village
- Location within Poland
- Coordinates: 51°40′N 18°21′E
- Country: Poland
- Voivodeship: Greater Poland
- County: Kalisz
- Gmina: Szczytniki

Chojno (Polish pronunciation: [ˈxɔjnɔ]) is a village in the administrative district of Gmina Szczytniki, within Kalisz County, Greater Poland Voivodeship, in west-central Poland.
