= Helenów, Białobrzegi County =

Helenów
- Village
- Location within Poland
- Coordinates: 51°41′34″N 20°53′58″E
- Country: Poland
- Voivodeship: Masovian
- County: Białobrzegi
- Gmina: Promna

Helenów [xɛˈlɛnuf] is a village in the administrative district of Gmina Promna, within Białobrzegi County, Masovian Voivodeship, in east-central Poland.
