= Domaniewice, Białobrzegi County =

Domaniewice
- Village
- Location within Poland
- Coordinates: 51°43′10″N 20°57′16″E
- Country: Poland
- Voivodeship: Masovian
- County: Białobrzegi
- Gmina: Promna

Domaniewice [dɔmaɲɛˈvit͡sɛ] is a village in the administrative district of Gmina Promna, within Białobrzegi County, Masovian Voivodeship, in east-central Poland.
