= Pieńki, Greater Poland Voivodeship =

Pieńki
- Village
- Location within Poland
- Coordinates: 51°43′23″N 18°20′45″E
- Country: Poland
- Voivodeship: Greater Poland
- County: Kalisz
- Gmina: Szczytniki

Pieńki [ˈpjɛɲki] is a village in the administrative district of Gmina Szczytniki, within Kalisz County, Greater Poland Voivodeship, in west-central Poland.
