= Cupel, Białobrzegi County =

Cupel
- Settlement
- Location within Poland
- Coordinates: 51°34′4″N 20°54′40″E
- Country: Poland
- Voivodeship: Masovian
- County: Białobrzegi
- Gmina: Stara Błotnica

Cupel [ˈt͡supɛl] is a settlement in the administrative district of Gmina Stara Błotnica, within Białobrzegi County, Masovian Voivodeship, in east-central Poland.
