= Gmina Szczytniki =

Gmina Szczytniki Szczytniki Commune
- Gmina
- Coat of arms

- Coordinates (Szczytniki): 51°41′N 18°20′E
- Country: Poland
- Voivodeship: Greater Poland
- County: Kalisz County
- Seat: Szczytniki

Area
  - Total: 110.66 km^{2} (42.73 sq mi)

Population (2006)
  - Total: 8,086
  - Density: 73.07/km^{2} (189.3/sq mi)

Gmina Szczytniki is a rural gmina (administrative district) in Kalisz County, Greater Poland Voivodeship, in west-central Poland. Its seat is the village of Szczytniki, which lies approximately 20 kilometres (12 mi) south-east of Kalisz and 126 km (78 mi) south-east of the regional capital Poznań.

The gmina covers an area of 110.66 square kilometres (42.7 sq mi), and as of 2006 its total population is 8,086.

== Villages ==
Gmina Szczytniki contains the villages and settlements of Antonin, Borek, Bronibór, Chojno, Cieszyków, Daniel, Główczyn, Górki, Gorzuchy, Grab, Guzdek, Helenów, Joanka, Kobylarka, Kornelin, Korzekwin, Kościany, Krowica Pusta, Krowica Zawodnia, Krzywda, Kuczewola, Lipka, Mała Gmina, Marchwacz, Marchwacz-Kolonia, Marcjanów, Mroczki Wielkie, Murowaniec, Niemiecka Wieś, Pamiątków, Pieńki, Popów, Poręby, Pośrednik, Radliczyce, Rudunki Szczytnickie, Sobiesęki Drugie, Sobiesęki Pierwsze, Sobiesęki Trzecie, Staw, Strużka, Szczytniki, Trzęsów, Tymieniec, Tymieniec-Dwór, Tymieniec-Jastrząb, Tymieniec-Kąty, Tymieniec-Niwka and Włodzimierz.

== Neighbouring gminas ==
Gmina Szczytniki is bordered by the gminas of Błaszki, Brzeziny, Godziesze Wielkie, Goszczanów, Koźminek and Opatówek.
