= Marchwacz =

- Village
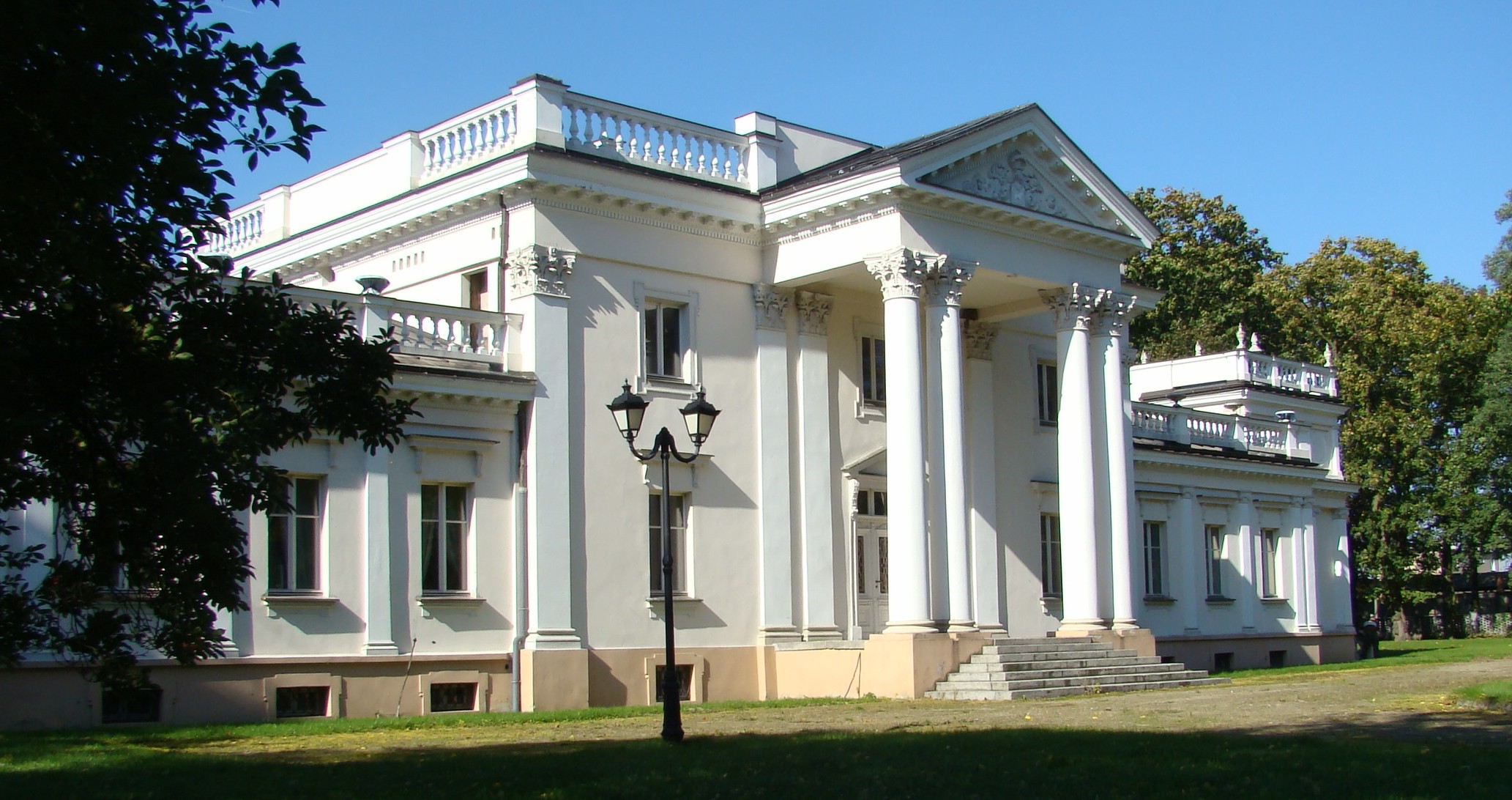
- Niemojowski Palace in Marchwacz

- Location within Poland
- Coordinates: 51°44′N 18°18′E
- Country: Poland
- Voivodeship: Greater Poland
- County: Kalisz
- Gmina: Szczytniki
- Time zone: UTC+1 (CET)
  - Summer (DST): UTC+2 (CEST)
- Vehicle registration: PKA

Marchwacz [ˈmarxfat͡ʂ] is a village in the administrative district of Gmina Szczytniki, within Kalisz County, Greater Poland Voivodeship, in central Poland.

== History ==
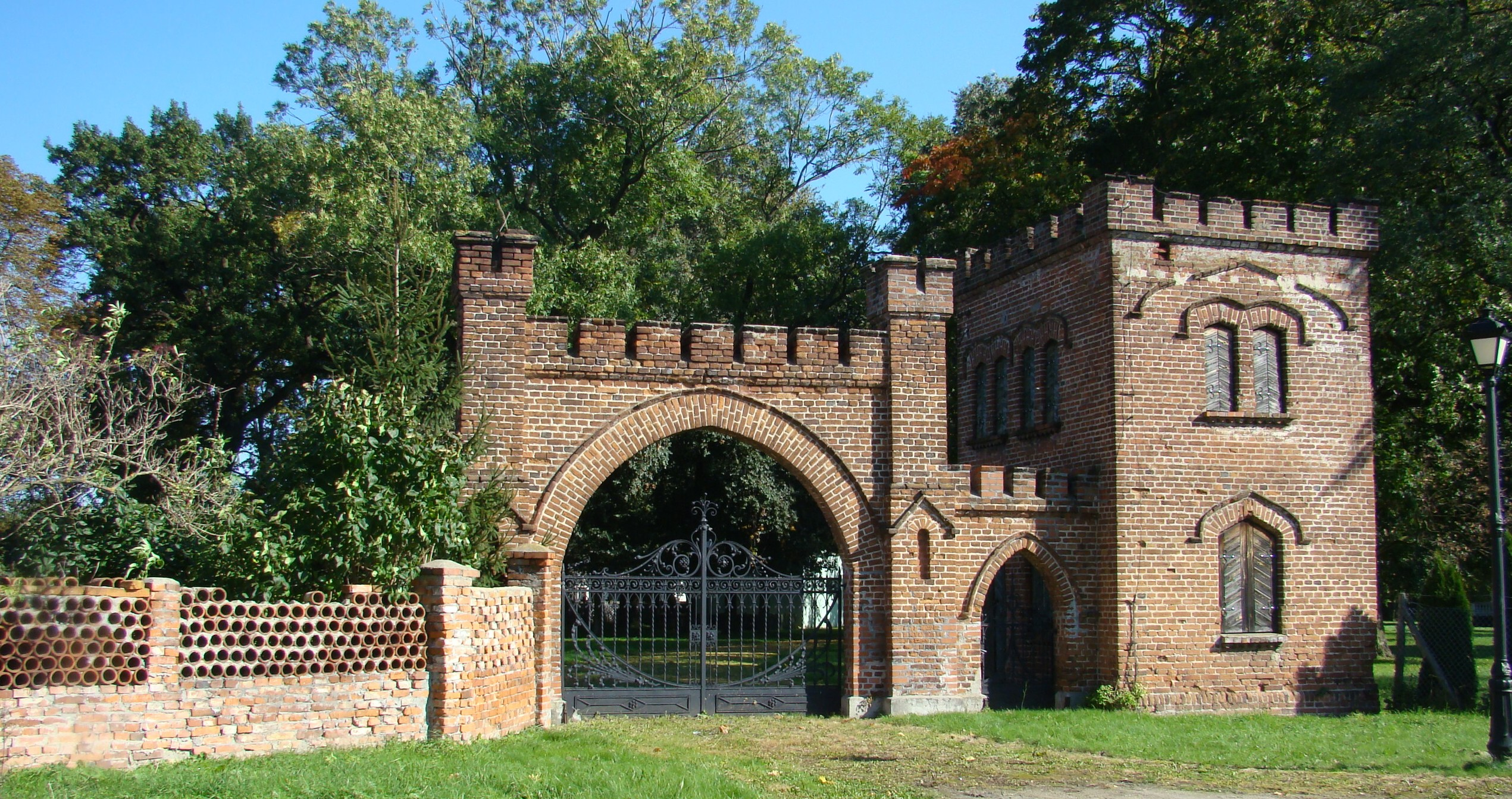
Entrance gate to the park

As part of the region of Greater Poland, i.e. the cradle of the Polish state, the area formed part of Poland since its establishment in the 10th century. Marchwacz was a private church village, administratively located in the Kalisz County in the Kalisz Voivodeship in the Greater Poland Province of the Kingdom of Poland.

In 1827, it had a population of 126. According to the 1921 census, the village with the adjacent manor farm had a population of 424, entirely Polish by nationality and Roman Catholic by confession.

Following the joint German-Soviet invasion of Poland, which started World War II in September 1939, the village was occupied by Germany. Shortly before their withdrawal, on January 21–22, 1945, German troops committed a massacre of 57 Polish inhabitants of Marchwacz, six other Poles, and twelve captured Soviet prisoners of war (see Nazi crimes against the Polish nation).

== Notable people ==
- Bonawentura Niemojowski (1787–1835), Polish lawyer, politician and writer
