= Strużka, Greater Poland Voivodeship =

Strużka
- Village
- Location within Poland
- Coordinates: 51°38′51″N 18°18′31″E
- Country: Poland
- Voivodeship: Greater Poland
- County: Kalisz
- Gmina: Szczytniki

Strużka [ˈstruʂka] is a village in the administrative district of Gmina Szczytniki, within Kalisz County, Greater Poland Voivodeship, in west-central Poland.
