= Gorzuchy =

- Village
- Location within Poland
- Coordinates: 51°43′25″N 18°22′01″E
- Country: Poland
- Voivodeship: Greater Poland
- County: Kalisz
- Gmina: Szczytniki

Gorzuchy [ɡɔˈʐuxɨ] is a village in the administrative district of Gmina Szczytniki, within Kalisz County, Greater Poland Voivodeship, in west-central Poland.
