= Marchwacz-Kolonia =

- Village
- Location within Poland
- Coordinates: 51°44′09″N 18°19′14″E
- Country: Poland
- Voivodeship: Greater Poland
- County: Kalisz
- Gmina: Szczytniki

Marchwacz-Kolonia [ˈmarxfat͡ʂ kɔˈlɔɲa] is a village in the administrative district of Gmina Szczytniki, within Kalisz County, Greater Poland Voivodeship, in west-central Poland.
