= Tymieniec-Niwka =

- Village
- Location within Poland
- Coordinates: 51°44′05″N 18°23′34″E
- Country: Poland
- Voivodeship: Greater Poland
- County: Kalisz
- Gmina: Szczytniki

Tymieniec-Niwka [tɨˈmjɛɲɛt͡s ˈnifka] is a village in the administrative district of Gmina Szczytniki, within Kalisz County, Greater Poland Voivodeship, in west-central Poland.
