= Sielce, Gmina Promna =

Sielce
- Village
- Location within Poland
- Coordinates: 51°42′56″N 21°00′15″E
- Country: Poland
- Voivodeship: Masovian
- County: Białobrzegi
- Gmina: Promna

Sielce [ˈɕɛlt͡sɛ] is a village in the administrative district of Gmina Promna, within Białobrzegi County, Masovian Voivodeship, in east-central Poland.
