= Tymieniec =

- Village
- Location within Poland
- Coordinates: 51°43′51″N 18°23′03″E
- Country: Poland
- Voivodeship: Greater Poland
- County: Kalisz
- Gmina: Szczytniki

Tymieniec [tɨˈmjɛɲɛt͡s] is a village in the administrative district of Gmina Szczytniki, within Kalisz County, Greater Poland Voivodeship, in west-central Poland.
