= Niemiecka Wieś =

- Village
- Location within Poland
- Coordinates: 51°39′18″N 18°19′57″E
- Country: Poland
- Voivodeship: Greater Poland
- County: Kalisz
- Gmina: Szczytniki

Niemiecka Wieś [ɲɛˈmjɛt͡ska ˈvjɛɕ] is a village in the administrative district of Gmina Szczytniki, within Kalisz County, Greater Poland Voivodeship, in west-central Poland.
