= Murowaniec, Gmina Szczytniki =

Murowaniec
- Village
- Location within Poland
- Coordinates: 51°42′36″N 18°17′33″E
- Country: Poland
- Voivodeship: Greater Poland
- County: Kalisz
- Gmina: Szczytniki

Murowaniec [murɔˈvaɲɛt͡s] is a village in the administrative district of Gmina Szczytniki, within Kalisz County, Greater Poland Voivodeship, in west-central Poland.
