= Guzdek =

- Village
- Location within Poland
- Coordinates: 51°39′4″N 18°15′53″E
- Country: Poland
- Voivodeship: Greater Poland
- County: Kalisz
- Gmina: Szczytniki
- Population: 40

Guzdek [ˈɡuzdɛk] is a village in the administrative district of Gmina Szczytniki, within Kalisz County, Greater Poland Voivodeship, in west-central Poland.
