= Sopot, Kavadarci =

Sopot Сопот
- Village
- Location within North Macedonia
- Coordinates: 41.491018°N 22.024126°E
- Country: North Macedonia
- Region: Vardar
- Municipality: Kavadarci

Population (2002)
  - Total: 804
- Time zone: UTC+1 (CET)
  - Summer (DST): UTC+2 (CEST)
- Website: .

Sopot (Macedonian: Сопот) is a village in the municipality of Kavadarci, North Macedonia.

== Demographics ==
According to the statistics of Bulgarian ethnographer Vasil Kanchov from 1900, 360 inhabitants lived in Sopot, 225 Muslim Bulgarians, 130 Christian Bulgarians and 5 Romani. According to the 2002 census, the village had a total of 804 inhabitants. Ethnic groups in the village include:

- Macedonians 800
- Serbs 1
- Romani 2
- Others 1
