= Trzęsów, Greater Poland Voivodeship =

Trzęsów
- Village
- Location within Poland
- Coordinates: 51°44′41″N 18°19′21″E
- Country: Poland
- Voivodeship: Greater Poland
- County: Kalisz
- Gmina: Szczytniki
- Population: 100

Trzęsów [ˈtʂɛ̃suf] is a village in the administrative district of Gmina Szczytniki, within Kalisz County, Greater Poland Voivodeship, in west-central Poland.
