= Helenów, Gmina Szczytniki =

Helenów
- Village
- Location within Poland
- Coordinates: 51°37′30″N 18°17′27″E
- Country: Poland
- Voivodeship: Greater Poland
- County: Kalisz
- Gmina: Szczytniki
- Time zone: UTC+1 (CET)
  - Summer (DST): UTC+2 (CEST)

Helenów [xɛˈlɛnuf] is a village in the administrative district of Gmina Szczytniki, within Kalisz County, Greater Poland Voivodeship, in central Poland.
