= Promna =

- Village
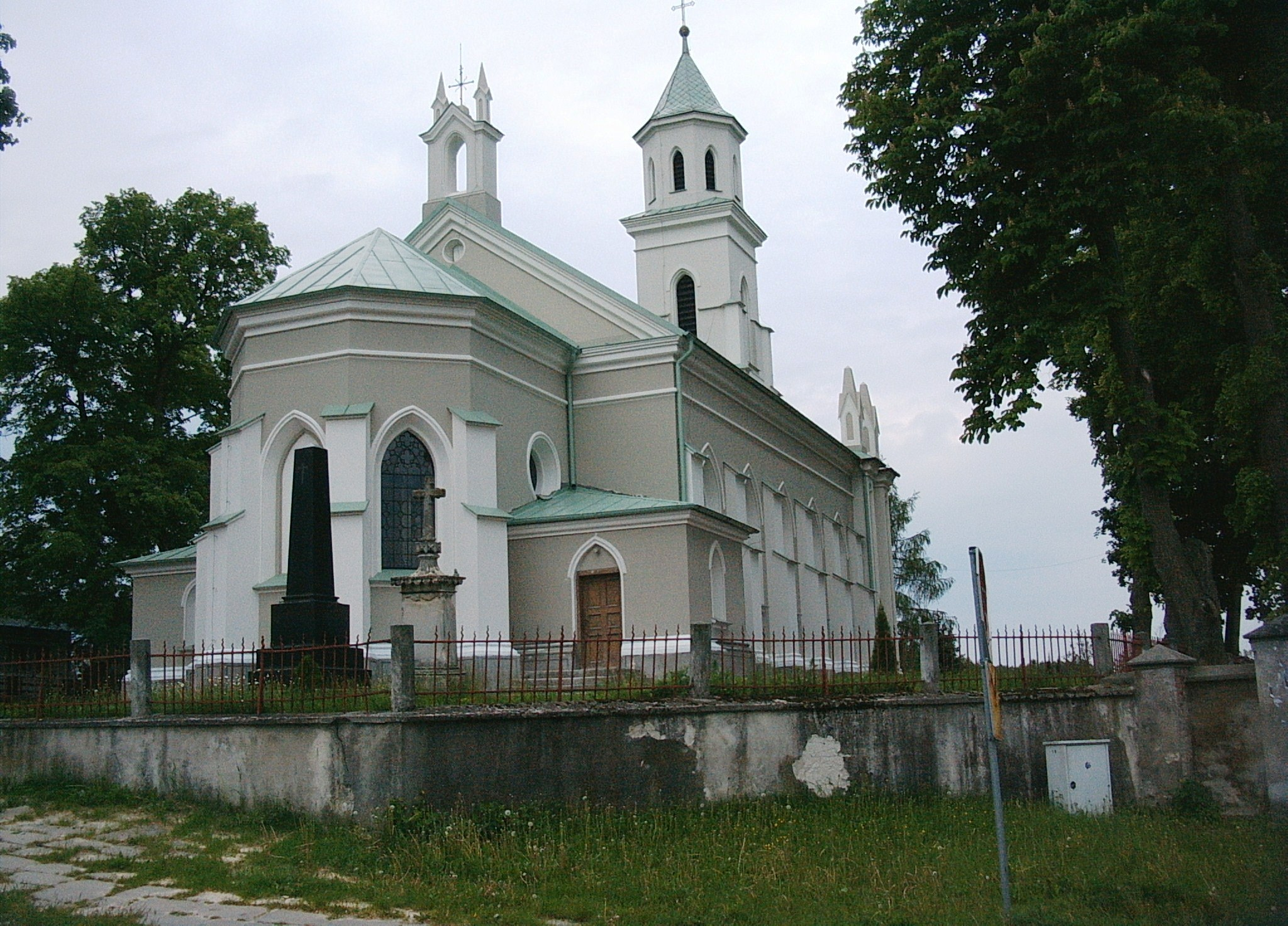

- Location within Poland
- Coordinates: 51°41′N 20°57′E
- Country: Poland
- Voivodeship: Masovian
- County: Białobrzegi
- Gmina: Promna

Promna [ˈprɔmna] is a village in Białobrzegi County, Masovian Voivodeship, in east-central Poland. It is the seat of the gmina (administrative district) called Gmina Promna.
