= Białobrzegi =

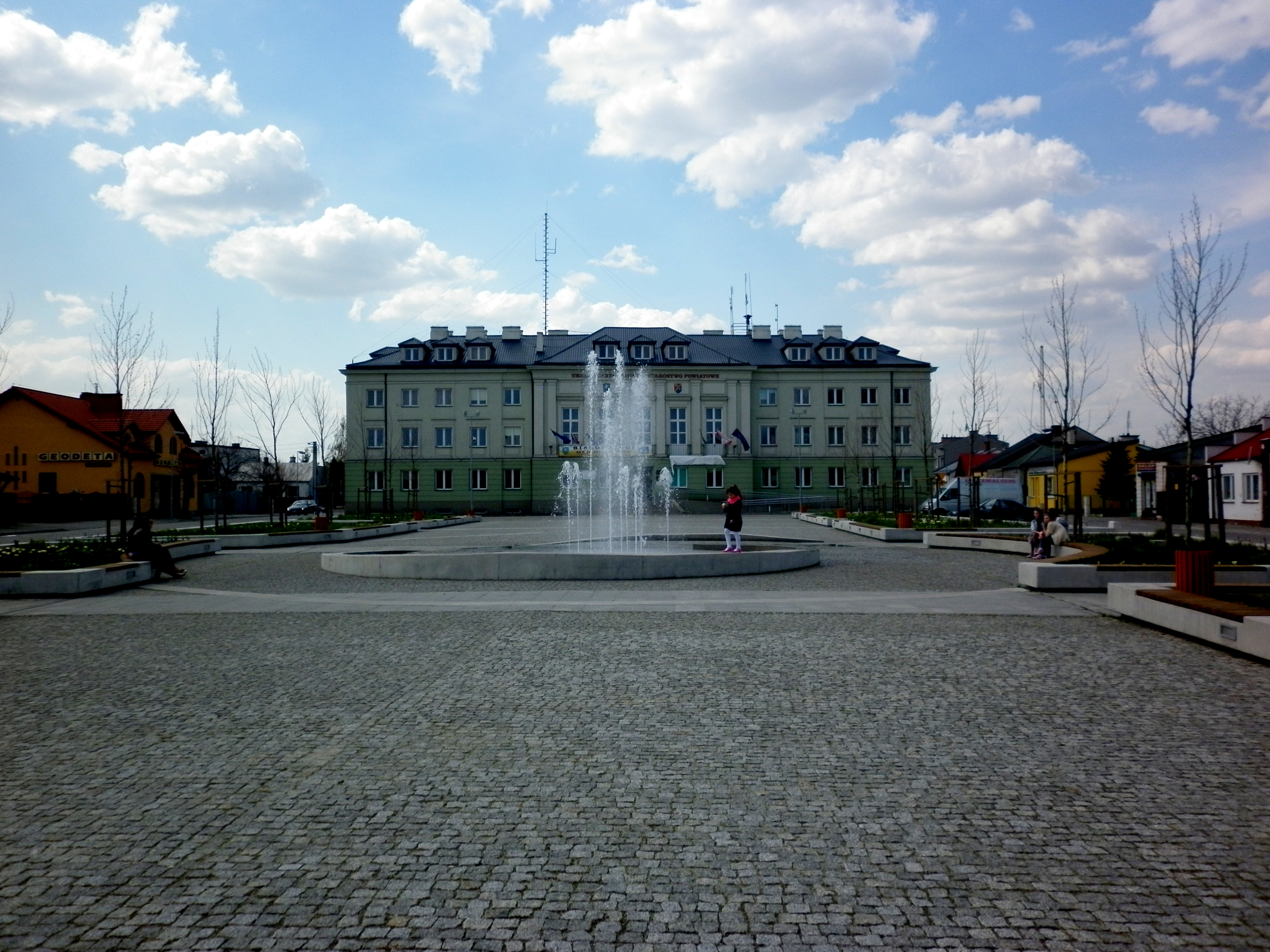
- Plac Zygmunta Starego (Sigismund the Old Square) with the municipal, commune and county office

- Flag Coat of arms

- Location within Poland
- Coordinates: 51°39′N 20°57′E
- Country: Poland
- Voivodeship: Masovian
- County: Białobrzegi
- Gmina: Gmina Białobrzegi
- Established: 14th century
- Town rights: 1541-1870, 1958

Government
  - Mayor: Adam Bolek

Area
  - Total: 7.51 km^{2} (2.90 sq mi)

Population (31 December 2021)
  - Total: 6,749
  - Density: 899/km^{2} (2,330/sq mi)
- Time zone: UTC+1 (CET)
  - Summer (DST): UTC+2 (CEST)
- Postal code: 26-800
- Area code: +48 48
- Car plates: WBR
- Website: http://www.bialobrzegi.pl

Białobrzegi [bʲawɔˈbʐɛɡʲi] is a town in Masovian Voivodeship, Poland, about 65 kilometres (40 miles) south of Warsaw. It is the capital of the Białobrzegi County and Gmina Białobrzegi (commune). The town is located on the border of the Białobrzegi Valley and Radom Plain, about 30 kilometres (19 miles) northwest of Radom. The river Pilica flows through the town. Białobrzegi is located in the Polish historic region of Mazovia, near its boundary with Lesser Poland. As of December 2021, the town has a population of 6,749.

== History ==
The history of the town dates back to 1540, when King Sigismund I the Old granted town rights to the town of Brzegi, which was located on the left bank of the Pilica, administratively in the Masovian Voivodeship in the Greater Poland Province. At that time, Brzegi belonged to a local noblewoman Anna Fałęcka, then it was property of other families. The town never gained significance and remained a small center, whose population was involved in trade and agriculture.

From 1815 it was located in the Russian Partition of Poland. During the Polish January Uprising, several units operated in the area, and in 1870, as a Russian reprisal for residents’ support of the insurrection, Białobrzegi was stripped of its town privileges and became a settlement. In 1910, a fire destroyed much of Białobrzegi. During World War I, there was further destruction, but afterwards the town slowly grew, due to the Warsaw-Kraków road, which passed through it. In 1918, following the war, Poland regained independence and control of Białobrzegi. Administratively, it was located in the Kielce Voivodeship. Following the joint German-Soviet invasion of Poland, which started World War II in September 1939, the settlement was occupied by Germany until 1945.

In 1958 Białobrzegi regained its town rights. Administratively, it was located in the Kielce Voivodeship, then the Radom Voivodeship from 1975 to 1998, and the Masovian Voivodeship since 1999.

== Demographics ==
Historical population

Year	Pop.	±%
1995	7,466	—
1997	7,464	−0.0%

Year	Pop.	±%
2000	7,171	−3.9%
2002	7,196	+0.3%

Year	Pop.	±%
2004	7,262	+0.9%
2006	7,301	+0.5%

== Transport ==
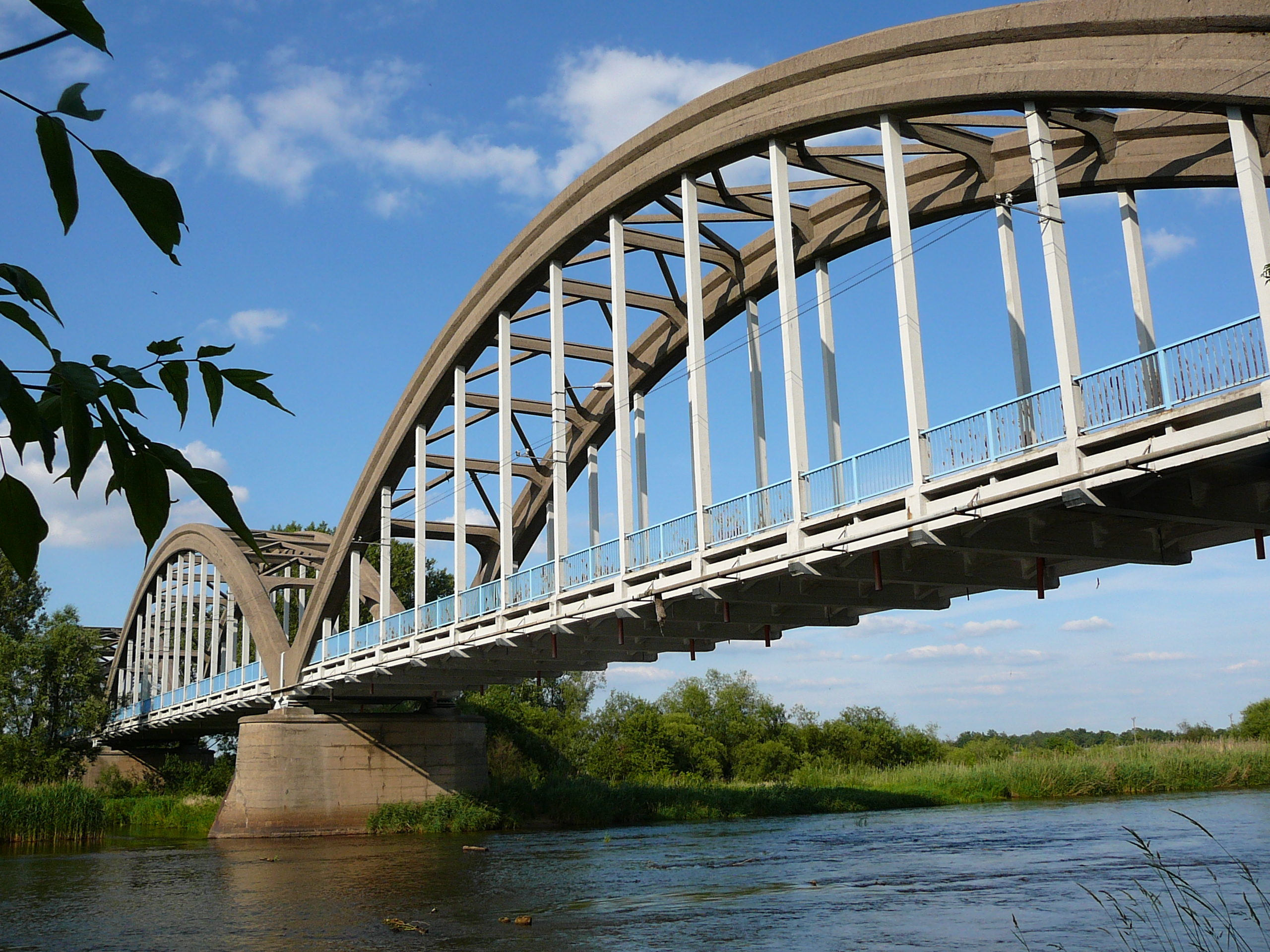
Bridge from 1936 over Pilica River

Białobrzegi is an important road hub, where expressway S7, which is part of the european route E77, crosses with national road no. 48.

== Sports ==
The town's main sports club is Pilica Białobrzegi with football, athletics and boxing sections.

== Twin towns and sister cities ==
Białobrzegi is twinned with:

- Allennes-les-Marais, France
