= Białobrzegi County =

Białobrzegi County Powiat białobrzeski
- County
- Flag Coat of arms

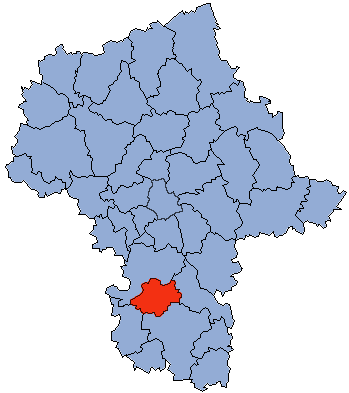
- Location within the voivodeship

- Division into gminas
- Coordinates (Białobrzegi): 51°39′N 20°57′E
- Country: Poland
- Voivodeship: Masovian
- Seat: Białobrzegi
- Gminas: Total 6: Gmina Białobrzegi; Gmina Promna; Gmina Radzanów; Gmina Stara Błotnica; Gmina Stromiec; Gmina Wyśmierzyce

Area
  - Total: 639.28 km^{2} (246.83 sq mi)

Population (2019)
  - Total: 33,524
  - Density: 52.440/km^{2} (135.82/sq mi)
  - Urban: 7,836
  - Rural: 25,688
- Car plates: WBR
- Website: www.bialobrzegipowiat.pl

Białobrzegi County (Polish: powiat białobrzeski) is a unit of territorial administration and local government (powiat) in Masovian Voivodeship, east-central Poland. It came into being on January 1, 1999, as a result of the Polish local government reforms passed in 1998. Its administrative seat and largest town is Białobrzegi, which lies 63 kilometres (39 mi) south of Warsaw. The only other town in the county is Wyśmierzyce, lying 10 km (6 mi) west of Białobrzegi.

The county covers an area of 639.28 square kilometres (246.8 sq mi). As of 2019 its total population is 33,524, out of which the population of Białobrzegi is 6,951, that of Wyśmierzyce is 885, and the rural population is 25,688.

== Neighbouring counties ==
Białobrzegi County is bordered by Grójec County to the north, Kozienice County to the east, Radom County to the south and Przysucha County to the south-west.

== Administrative divisions ==
The county is subdivided into six gminas (two urban-rural and four rural). These are listed in the following table, in descending order of population.

Gmina	Type	Area (km^{2})	Population (2019)	Seat
Gmina Białobrzegi	urban-rural	78.9	10,300	Białobrzegi
Gmina Stromiec	rural	156.5	5,664	Stromiec
Gmina Promna	rural	120.7	5,573	Promna
Gmina Stara Błotnica	rural	96.2	5,321	Stara Błotnica
Gmina Radzanów	rural	82.6	3,900	Radzanów
Gmina Wyśmierzyce	urban-rural	104.3	2,766	Wyśmierzyce
