= Bukowno (disambiguation) =

Bukowno is a town in Lesser Poland Voivodeship, south Poland.

Bukowno may refer to the following places:

- Bukowno, Silesian Voivodeship (south Poland)
- Bukowno, Choszczno County in West Pomeranian Voivodeship (north-west Poland)
- Bukówno, Masovian Voivodeship (east-central Poland)
