= Kępina =

Kępina may refer to the following places:

- Kępina, Białobrzegi County in Masovian Voivodeship (east-central Poland)
- Kępina, Grójec County in Masovian Voivodeship (east-central Poland)
- Kępina, Płock County in Masovian Voivodeship (east-central Poland)
- Kępina, Greater Poland Voivodeship (west-central Poland)
- Kępina, Pomeranian Voivodeship (north Poland)
