= The Polish Rider =

1650s painting by Rembrandt

- Jeździec Polski (Lisowczyk) (Polish)
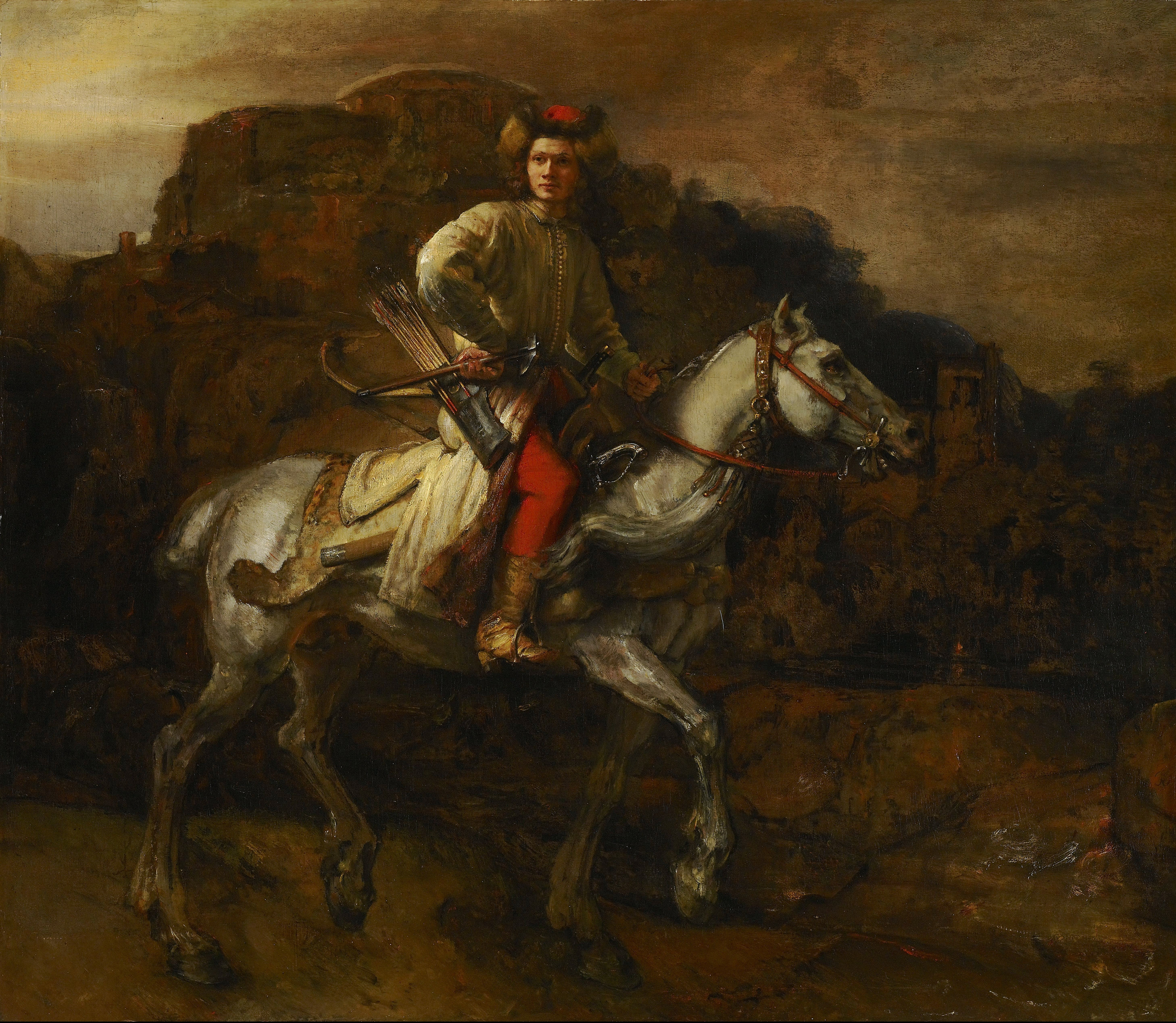
- Artist: Rembrandt
- Year: 1650s
- Dimensions: 117 cm × 135 cm (45.9 in × 53.1 in)
- Location: Frick Collection, New York

The Polish Rider is a seventeenth-century painting by Rembrandt, usually dated to the 1650s, of a young man traveling on horseback through a murky landscape, now in the Frick Collection in New York. When the painting was sold by Zdzisław Tarnowski to Henry Frick in 1910, there was consensus that the work was by the Dutch painter Rembrandt. This attribution has since been contested, though those who contest it remain in the minority.

There has also been debate over whether the painting was intended as a portrait of a particular person, living or historical, and if so of whom, or if not, what it was intended to represent. Both the quality of the painting and its slight air of mystery are commonly recognized, though parts of the background are very sketchily painted or unfinished.

== Attribution to Rembrandt ==
The first western scholar to discuss the painting was Wilhelm von Bode who in his History of Dutch Painting (1883) stated that it was a Rembrandt dating from his "late" period, that is, 1654. Somewhat later, Abraham Bredius examined the picture quite closely and had no doubts that its author was Rembrandt. At the beginning of the twentieth century, Alfred von Wurzbach suggested that Rembrandt's student Aert de Gelder might have been the author, but his opinion was generally disregarded. Throughout most of the twentieth century, there was general agreement that the painting was indeed by Rembrandt and even Julius S. Held, who at one time questioned its Polish connection, never doubted Rembrandt's authorship. However, in 1984, Josua Bruyn, then a member of the Rembrandt Research Project (RRP) tentatively suggested that certain characteristics of the work of Willem Drost, another student of Rembrandt, could be observed in the painting. Though the mysterious and somewhat solemn expression on the Rider's brilliantly painted face point to Rembrandt, The Polish Rider is unlike Rembrandt's other work in certain other ways. In particular, Rembrandt rarely worked on equestrian paintings, the only other known equestrian portrait in Rembrandt's work being the Portrait of Frederick Rihel, 1663 (National Gallery, London).

But Bruyn's remained a minority opinion, the suggestion of Drost's authorship is now generally rejected, and the Frick itself never changed its own attribution, the label still reading "Rembrandt" and not "attributed to" or "school of". More recent opinion has shifted even more decisively in favor of the Frick, with Simon Schama in his 1999 book Rembrandt's Eyes, and scholar Ernst van de Wetering, chair of the Rembrandt Project (Melbourne Symposium, 1997), both arguing for attribution to the master. Those few scholars who still question Rembrandt's authorship feel that the execution is uneven, and favour different attributions for different parts of the work. A 1998 study published by the RRP concluded that another artist's hand, besides that of Rembrandt, was involved in the work. Rembrandt may have started the painting in the 1650s, but perhaps he left it unfinished and it may have been completed by someone else.

== Subject ==
The idealised, inscrutable character has encouraged various theories about its subject, if the picture is a portrait. Candidates have included Marcjan Aleksander Ogiński from the Polish-Lithuanian Ogiński family, as asserted by the 18th-century owners of the painting; and Jonasz Szlichtyng, Polish Protestant theologian. Others believe that the outfit of the rider, the weapons and even the breed of horse are all Polish. Dutch equestrian portraits were infrequent in the 17th century and traditionally showed a fashionably dressed rider on a well-bred, spirited horse, as in Rembrandt's Frederick Rihel.

Historical characters have also been suggested, ranging from Old Testament David to the Prodigal Son and the Mongolian warrior Tamerlane, or the Dutch medieval hero, Gijsbrecht IV of Amstel. A “soldier of Christ”, an idealistic representation of a mounted soldier defending Eastern Europe against the Turks, or simply a foreign soldier have been suggested. The young rider appears to many people to face nameless danger in a bare mountainous landscape that contains a mysterious building, dark water and in the distance evidence of a fire. In his film The Art Mysteries, the Polish art critic Waldemar Januszczak argues that the rider represents the First Horseman of the Apocalypse, who rides a white horse, carries a bow and brings 'Conquest', as described in the Book of Revelation (6:2). The rider is crossing the devastated landscape of Europe after the Thirty Years' War, and is on the way to the New Jerusalem as predicted by millenarians in the Second Coming of Christ.

In a 1793 letter to King Stanislaus Augustus of the Polish–Lithuanian Commonwealth, the painting's owner Michał Kazimierz Ogiński identified the rider as "a Cossack on horseback", and the king recognized the subject as a member of the irregular military unit known as Lisowczyk. In 1883, Wilhelm Bode, an expert in Dutch painting, described the rider as a Polish magnate in the national costume. In 1944, the American Rembrandt scholar Julius S. Held contested the claim that the subject was Polish and suggested the rider's costume could be Hungarian. Two Polish scholars suggested in 1912 that the model for the portrait was Rembrandt's son Titus.

== Provenance ==
- Michał Kazimierz Ogiński, 1791.
- Stanislaus II Augustus of Poland, Warsaw, 1793.
- Estate of Stanislaus.
- Countess Teresa Tyszkiewicz, 1813.
- Prince Ksawery Drucki-Lubecki, 1814.
- Count Hieronim Stroynowski, 1815.
- Senator Walerian Stroynowski.
- Countess Waleria Tarnowska née Stroynowska, of Dzików, Galicia, 1834.
- Henry Frick, 1910, bequeathed to the Frick Collection.

== Related travesty picture ==
In 1993 the artist Russell Connor painted a portrait in the style of Rembrandt showing the Dutch master, palette in hand, standing in front of the incomplete Polish Rider. With a twist of dry irony, Connor attributed the painting to Rembrandt's pupil Carel Fabritius and submitted it to The New Yorker with a joke note saying that the painting had been found in a basement in Pinsk, Belarus. The magazine published a reproduction of Connor's painting with a slightly reworked version of his comments, obviously not intending to pass it off as genuine but as a comment on the zeal of the Rembrandt Commission, who at the time were questioning the authenticity of the Polish Rider and many other paintings formerly known as genuine Rembrandt canvases.

== See also ==
- List of paintings by Rembrandt
- A Polish Nobleman (1637), a painting by Rembrandt van Rijn.
- Xavier F. Salomon, chief curator at the Frick Collection, "Cocktails with a Curator" 17 April 2020
- Maira Kalman and Xavier F. Salomon, Rembrandt's Polish Rider, The Frick Collection, 2019.Rembrandt’s Polish Rider | The Frick Collection
- Coup de Grâce (novel) (1939), by Marguerite Yourcenar which features the painting being seen in the Frick
