= Łukaszów =

Łukaszów may refer to the following places in Poland:

- Łukaszów, Lower Silesian Voivodeship (south-west Poland)
- Łukaszów, Masovian Voivodeship (east-central Poland)
