= Michał Kleofas Ogiński =

Polish diplomat, politician, and composer

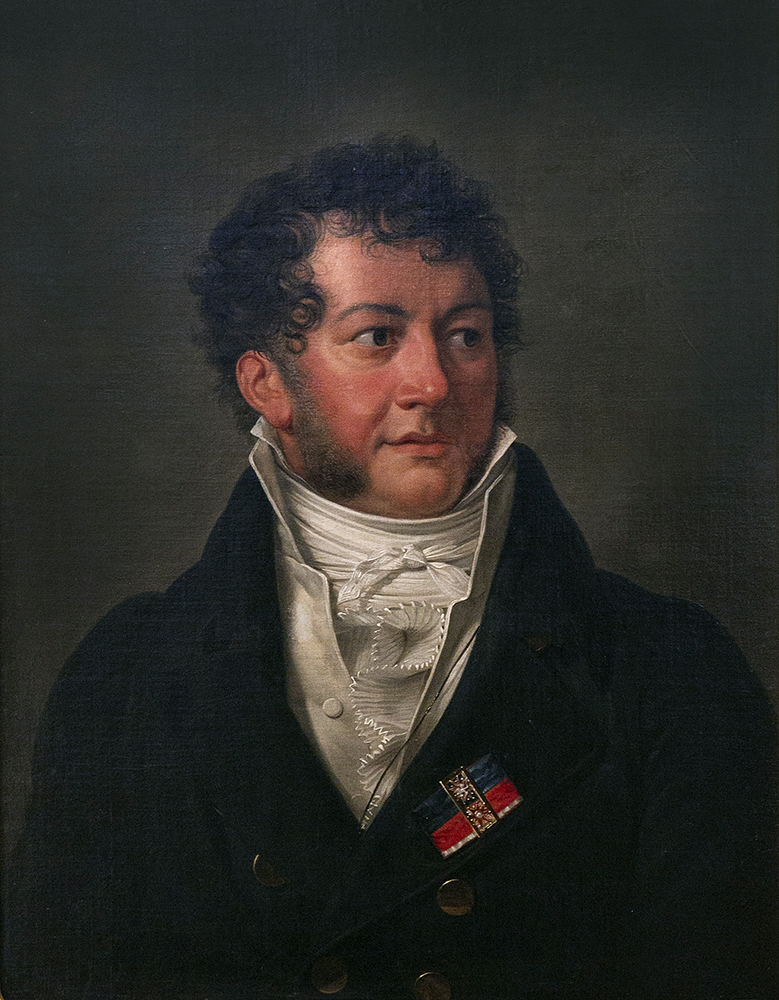
- Portrait by François-Xavier Fabre
- Born: Kleofas Michał Franciszek Feliks Antoni Ignacy Józef Tadeusz Ogiński; 25 September 1765; Guzów or the surroundings of Salantai, Polish–Lithuanian Commonwealth
- Died: 15 October 1833 (aged 68); Florence, Grand Duchy of Tuscany
- Known for: Music, diplomacy
- Notable work: Farewell to My Homeland
- Movement: Classicism and Romanticism
- Spouse(s): Izabela Lasocka (1789–1802), Maria de Néri (since 1802)

Michał Kleofas Ogiński (25 September 1765 – 15 October 1833) was a Polish-Lithuanian diplomat and politician, Grand Treasurer of Lithuania, and a senator of Tsar Alexander I. He was also a composer of late Classical and early Romantic music.

== Early life ==
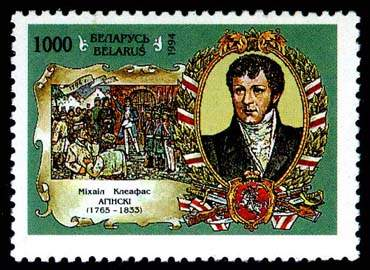
Michał Ogiński on a 1994 Belarusian stamp

It is claimed by some sources that Ogiński was born in Guzów in Mazovia (west of Warsaw) in the Kingdom of Poland. Nevertheless, in 2025 Lithuanian researchers found records in metrics of the Salantai Church of the Assumption where it is stated that Ogiński was born in the surroundings of Salantai (present-day Kretinga District Municipality of Lithuania) and was baptized in the Salantai Church of the Assumption. His father, Andrzej, was a Polish-Lithuanian nobleman from the Ogiński family and Trakai governor of the Grand Duchy of Lithuania. Hence, some sources indicate that Michał Ogiński was Lithuanian. His mother, Paulina Szembek (1740–1797), was the daughter of Polish magnate, Marek Szembek, whose ancestors were Austrian, and Jadwiga Rudnicka, who was of Lithuanian descent. His first introduction to music arose during a visit to relatives at Słonim where Michał Kazimierz Ogiński had a contemporary European theatre that hosted opera and ballet productions.

Michał Kleofas received an Enlightenment gentleman's education. He studied music with Józef Kozłowski and took violin lessons from Giovanni Battista Viotti, Pierre Baillot, and Ivan Mane Jarnović. Since his father's diplomatic mission to Vienna in 1772, the prince's tutor was Jean Rolay, later tutor to Emperor Leopold II. Michał Kleofas learned French, German and Latin. Years later, Ogiński erected a monument to his tutor at the palace in Zaliessie as a token of his gratitude.

Michał Kleofas had an older sister, Józefa, and half-brothers, his mother's sons from previous marriages: Feliks Łubieński and Antoni Protazy Potocki.

== Career ==
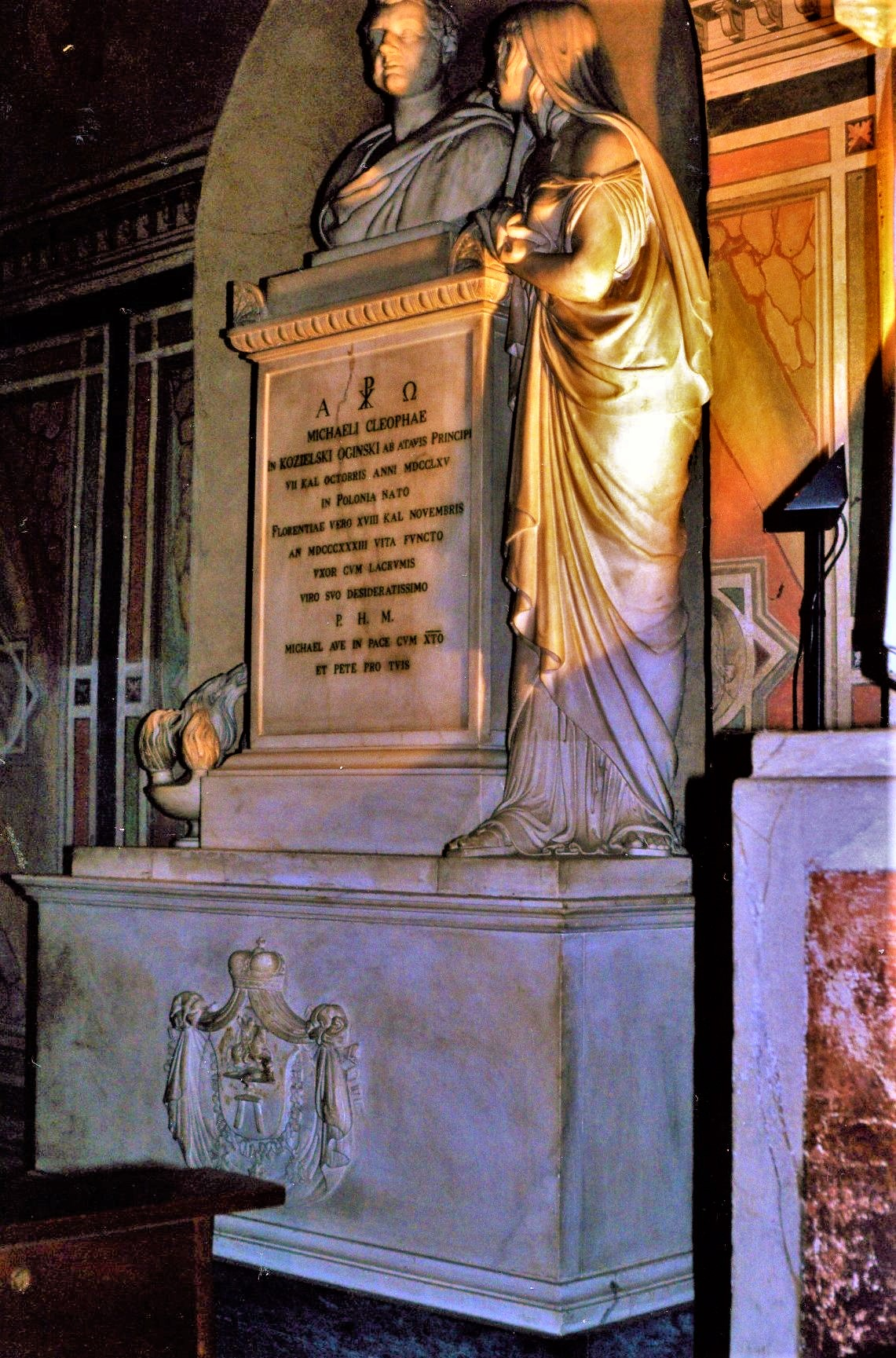
Ogiński's tomb at Basilica di Santa Croce in Florence

Aged only 20, Ogiński was chosen as an envoy of the Polish–Lithuanian Commonwealth. He served as an adviser to King Stanisław August Poniatowski and supported him during the Great Sejm of 1788–1792.

=== Great Sejm ===
In 1788 he received the Order of Saint Stanislaus and in 1789 - the Order of the White Eagle, Poland's highest order. In 1790 he was dispatched as a diplomatic representative to the United Kingdom, where he met with Lord Mansfield who warned him about the danger posed by the tri-partite powers about to dismember the Kingdom of Poland. After 1790, he was sent to The Hague as a diplomatic representative of Poland to the Netherlands and was Polish agent in Constantinople and Paris. In 1793, he was nominated to the office of Vice-Treasurer of Lithuania.

=== Kościuszko Uprising ===
During the Kościuszko Uprising in 1794, Ogiński commanded his own unit. After the insurrection was suppressed, he emigrated to Constantinople and later to France, where he sought support for the Polish-Lithuanian Commonwealth.

=== Napoleonic Wars ===
At that time he saw the creation of the Duchy of Warsaw by the Emperor as a stepping stone to the eventual full independence of the Commonwealth. He dedicated his only opera, Zelis et Valcour, to Napoleon. In 1810, Ogiński withdrew from political activity in exile and, disappointed with Napoleon, returned to Vilnius. Adam Jerzy Czartoryski introduced him to Tsar Alexander I, who made Ogiński a Russian Senator. Ogiński tried in vain to convince the Tsar to reconstitute the former Commonwealth. Disillusioned, he moved abroad in 1815. He died in Florence in 1833.

== Works ==
The polonaise Farewell to the Homeland (Pożegnanie Ojczyzny) is commonly attributed to Ogiński, allegedly written in 1794 in the Zalesie region (then part of the Polish-Lithuanian Commonwealth, today in Belarus), on the occasion of his emigration after the suppression of the Kościuszko Uprising. There is however no manuscript or document to support this attribution. Recent research shows that, although the real composer of the piece has not been identified, it is by all means not a composition by Ogiński.

Ogiński admired French and Italian opera as well as the works of Haydn and Mozart. He was a violinist, and played the clavichord and the balalaika. He began composing marches and military songs in the 1790s that gained popularity among the rebels of 1794. He composed some 20 polonaises, piano pieces, mazurkas, marches, romances and waltzes.

Some of his other popular works and compositions include:

- Opera Zelis et Valcour, ou 'Bonaparte au Caire' (1799).
- Treatise 'Letters about music' (1828).
- 'Mémoires sur la Pologne et les Polonais, depuis 1788 jusqu'à la fin de 1815' ('Memories of Poland and the Poles, from 1788 until the end of 1815'), published in Paris.

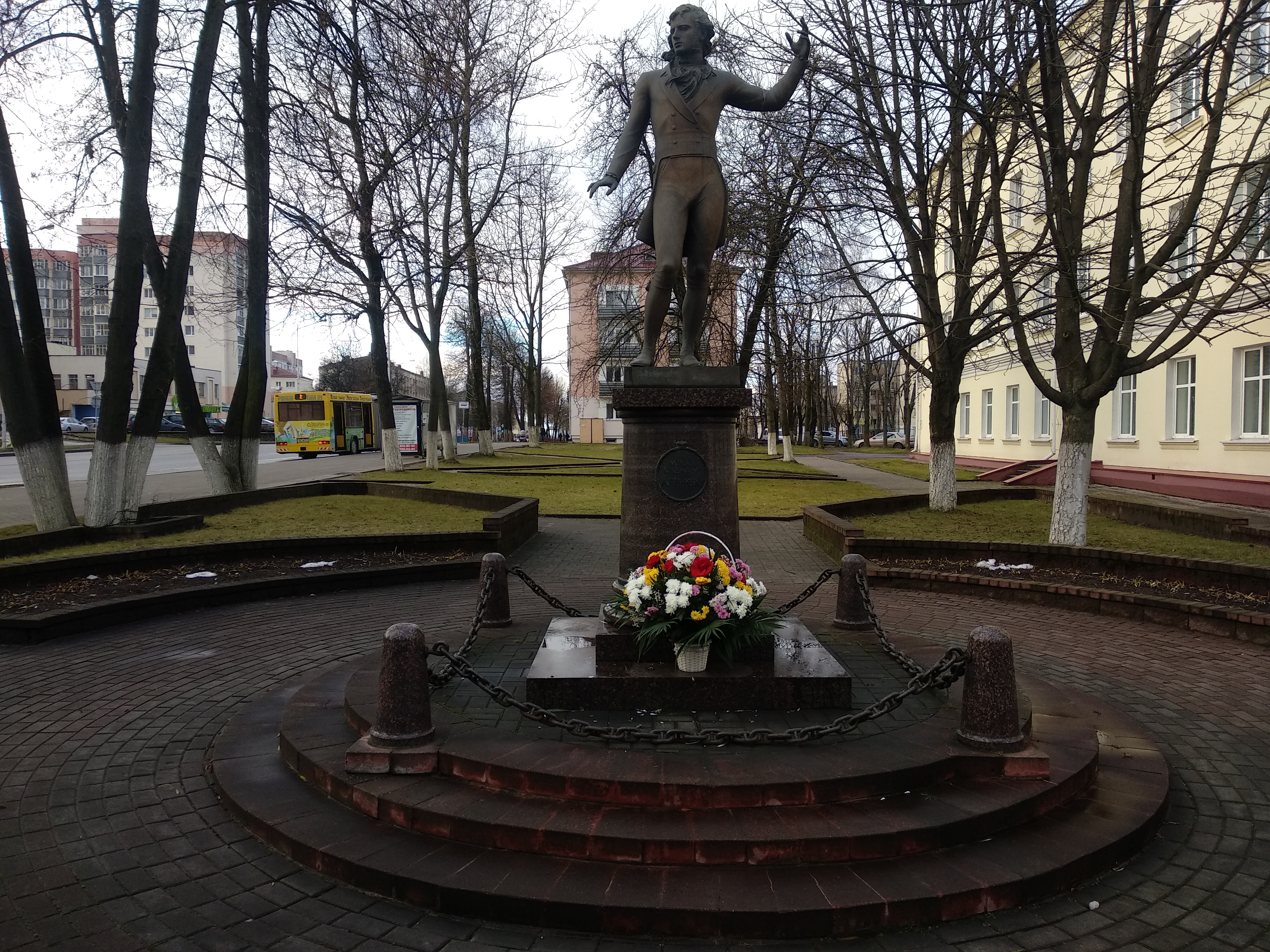
Monument of Michał Kleofas Ogiński in Maladzyechna, Belarus

== See also ==
- Feliks Łubieński
- Marcjan Aleksander Ogiński

== Sources ==
- Oginski (1829). "Oginski's Memoirs on Poland". The Foreign Quarterly Review. 3. Treuttel and Würtz.
- Garlington, J. C. (1865). Men of the Time. A biographical dictionary of eminent living characters of both sexes. London: George Routledge and sons.
- Konopczynski, Wadysaw (1919). "The Congress of Vienna". A brief outline of Polish history. Geneva.
- Pana Ministra (1938). Rocznik Służby Zagranicznej Rzeczypospolitej Polskiej według stanu na 1 kwietnia 1938 (in Polish). Warszawa.
- Brett-James, Antony (1966). 1812: Eyewitness Accounts of Napoleon's Defeat in Russia. St. Martin's Press.
- Lojek, Jerzy (1983). "British Policy toward Russia and Polish Affairs, 1790-1791". The Polish Review. 28 (2).
- Ehrman, John (1983). The Younger Pitt: The reluctant transition. Stanford University Press.
- Klimaszewski, Bolesław (1984). An outline of Polish Culture. Warsaw: Interpress.
- Cate, Curtis (1985). The War of the Two Emperors. New York: Random House. ISBN 978-0-394-53670-5.
- Karpińki, Maciej (1989). The Theatre of Andrzej Wajda. Cambridge University Press.
- Samson, Jim (1995). The Cambridge Companion to Chopin. Cambridge University Press.
- Marcinek, Roman; Chrzanowski, Tadeusz (1996). Encyklopedia Polski. Wydawnictwo Kluszczyński.
- Lerski, Jerzy Jan (1996). Historical dictionary of Poland, 966-1945. Greenwood Press.
- J. Mikoś, Michael (1996). Polish Baroque and Enlightenment literature: an anthology. Slavica Publishers.
- Randel, Don Michael (1996). The Harvard Bibliographical Dictionary of music. Cambridge University Press.
- Załuski, Iwo (February 1997). "A Polish family in music".
- Wintle, Justin (2002). Makers of Nineteenth-Century Culture: 1800–1914. Routledge.
- Kielian-Gilbert, Marianne (2004). "Chopiniana and Music's Contextual Allusions". In Goldberg, Halina (ed.). The Age of Chopin: Interdisciplinary Inquiries. Indiana University Press.
- Dunin-Wilczyński, Zbigniew (2006). Order Św. Stanisława (in Polish). Warszawa.
- Lennart, Bes (2007). Baltic connections: archival guide to the maritime relations of the countries around the Baltic Sea (including the Netherlands) 1450-1800. Vol. 1. Brill.
- Niewiadomska-Kocik, Joanna (2021). "Dom rodzinny Michała Kleofasa księcia Ogińskiego (1765–1833)". In Zemło, Mariusz (ed.). Małe Miasta. Dom polski w refleksji badawczej (in Polish). Wydawnictwo Uniwersytetu w Białymstoku.
