= Church of Mother of God of the Rosary, Soly =

Church of Mother of God of the Rosary
- Касцёл Маці Божай Ружанцовай
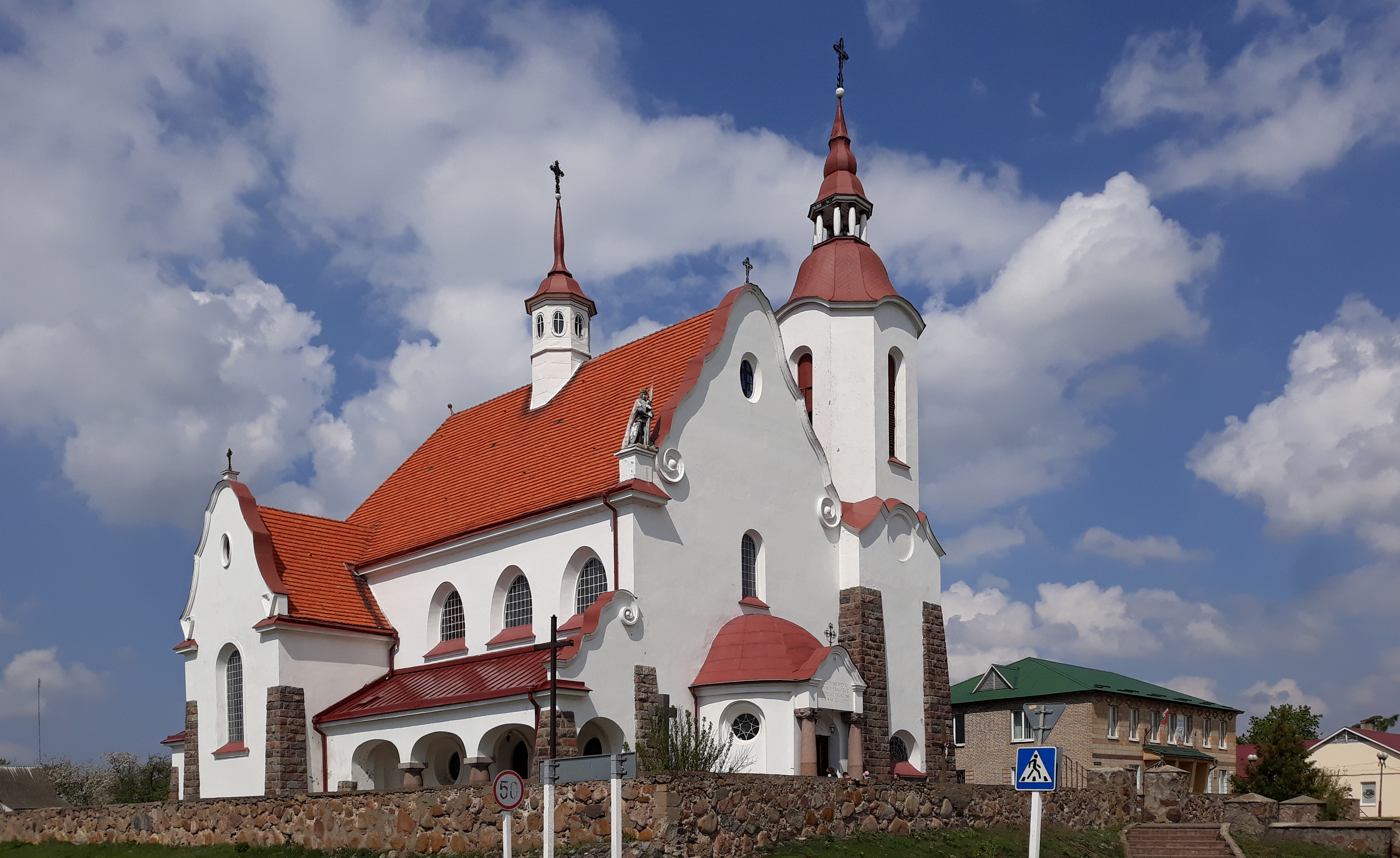
- Church of Mother of God of the Rosary
- 53°30′58″N 26°10′48″E
- Location: Soly, Smarhon District, Grodno Region
- Country: Belarus
- Denomination: Roman Catholic

History
- Status: Parish church

Architecture
- Functional status: Active
- Architect: Adam Dubanovich
- Completed: 1926—1934

Specifications
- Height: 35 m
- Materials: Brick

Church of Mother of God of the Rosary (Belarusian: Касцёл Маці Божай Ружанцовай, Polish: Maci Božaj Ružancovaj) is a Roman Catholic church in Soly, Smarhon District, Grodno Region, in Belarus. It is an example of the Belarusian Art Nouveau architecture and was built in 1926–1934. The church is a site of cultural heritage of Belarus.

== History ==
Soly had a Catholic church from 1589. The church building was destroyed during the Russo-Polish War (1654–1667) and then again in Napoleonic war, but every time was restored.

Modern brick building was built in place of old wooden one in 1926-1934 by architect Adam Dubanovich. The church was active after the Second World War till present day.

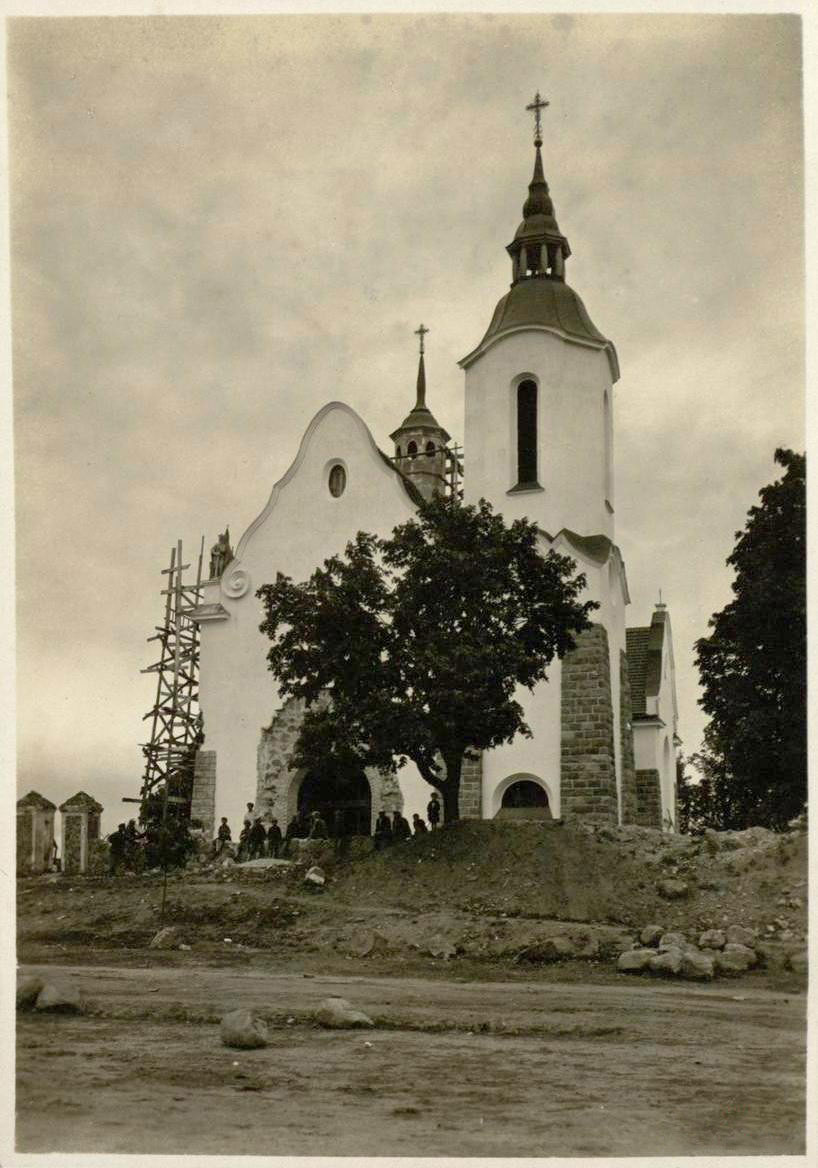
Church in 1930.

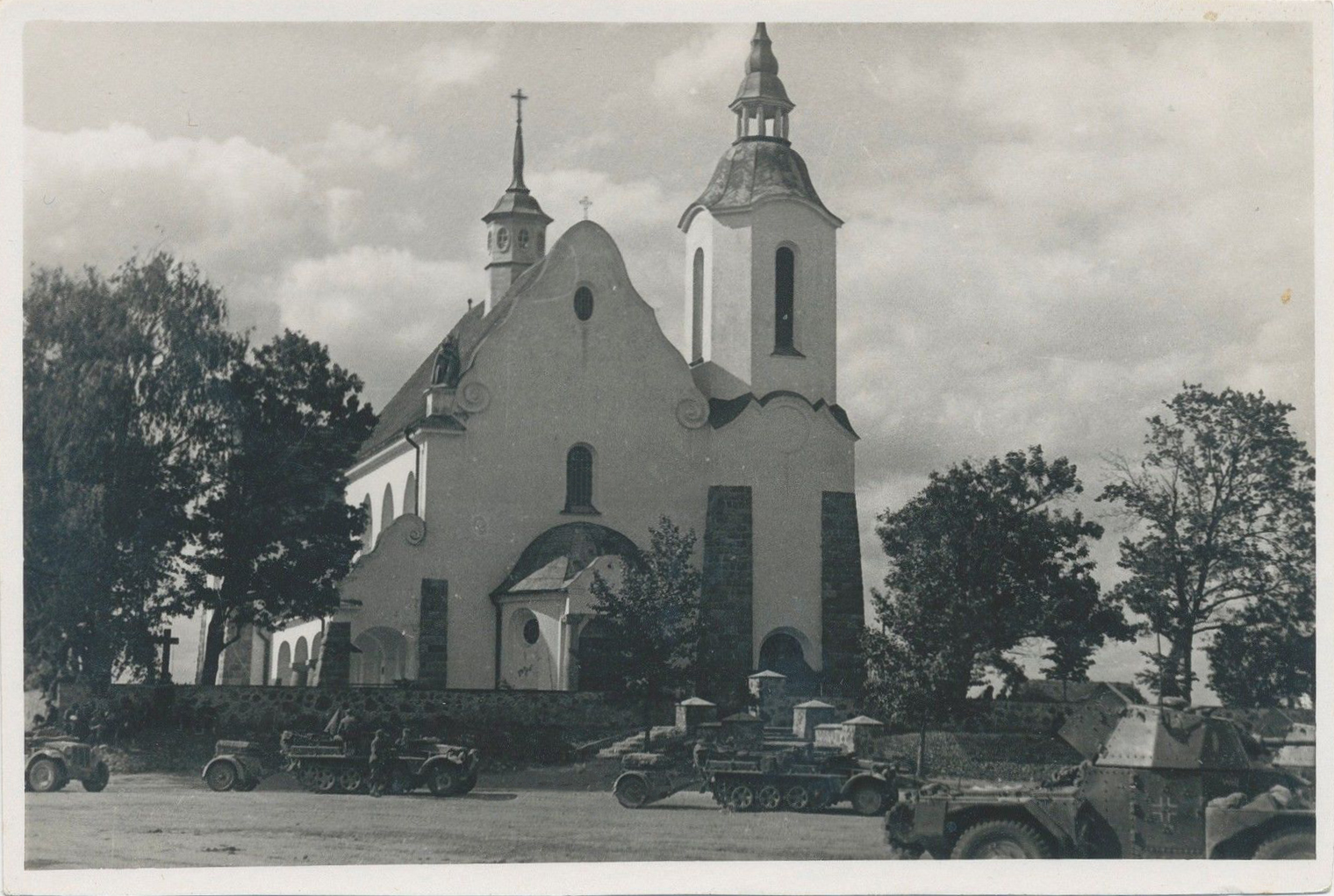
Church during German occupation, Second World War, 1941

== Plan of the church ==
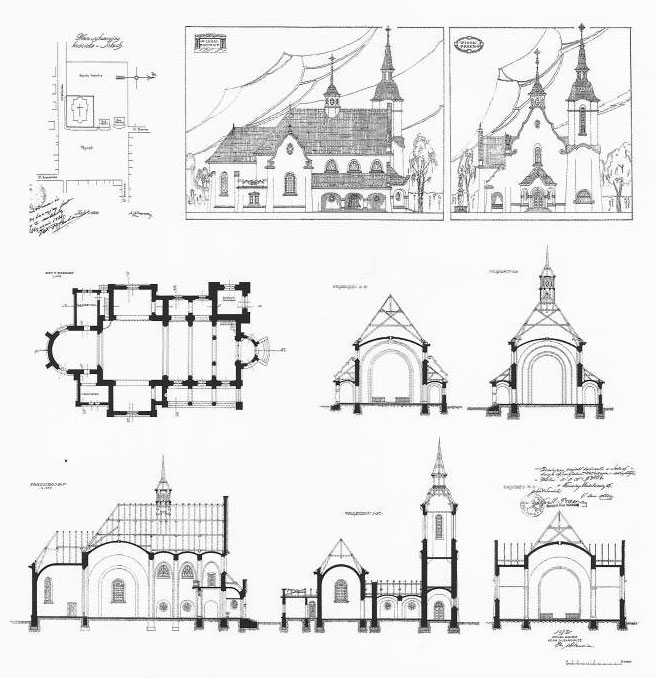
Plan of the church by its architect Adam Dubanovich, 1925
