= Ogiński family =

Lithuanian noble family

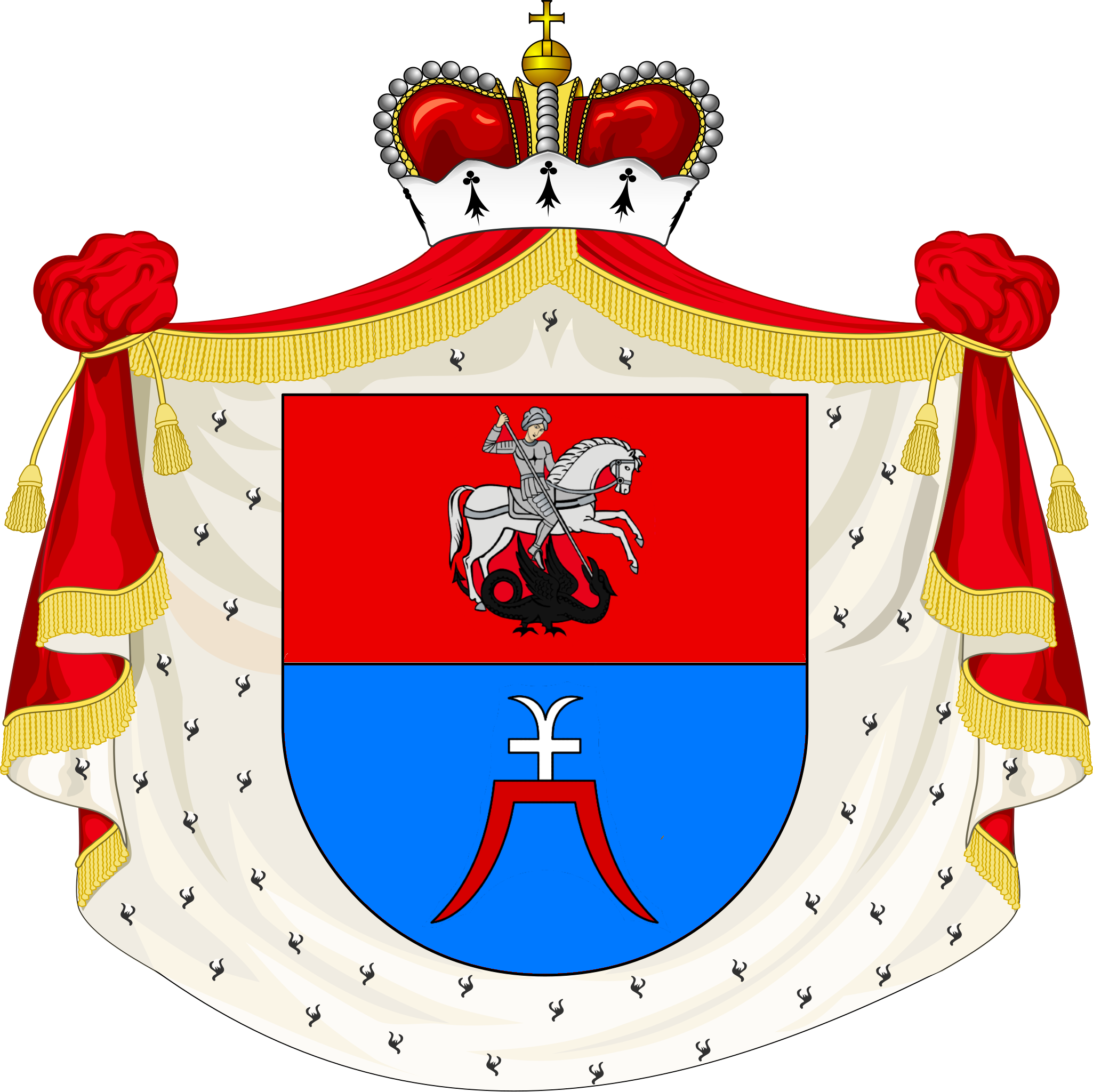
Coat of arms of the Ogiński family

The House of Ogiński, feminine form: Ogińska, plural: Ogińscy (Lithuanian: Oginskiai, Belarusian: Агінскія, Ahinskija) was a noble family of Grand Duchy of Lithuania and Poland (later, the Polish–Lithuanian Commonwealth), member of the Princely houses of Poland and Lithuania.

They were most likely of Rurikid stock, related to Chernihiv Knyaz family, and originated from the Smolensk region, incorporated into the Grand Duchy of Lithuania in approximately the fourteenth century. The family bears its name from Uogintai (Polish: Oginty, in present-day Kaišiadorys district of Lithuania), a major estate of the family in Lithuania that was granted to precursor of the family, Knyaz Dmitry Hlushonok (d. 1510), by Grand Duke of Lithuania Alexander in 1486.

An important family in the Grand Duchy of Lithuania, the family had produced many important officials of the state, as well as several notable musicians. The political stronghold of the Ogiński clan was the Vitebsk Voivodeship, where a palace was built in the first half of the seventeenth century by Samuel Ogiński. Until the beginning of the nineteenth century, it was the largest public building in the city of Vitebsk.

On September 18, 1711 Bishop Bogusław Gosiewski sold the town of Maladzyechna to the Ogiński family. Among the owners of the area were Kazimierz Ogiński and Tadeusz Ogiński, the Castellan of Trakai. The Ogiński family made the city one of the main centres of their domain. They erected a new, classicist palace with notable frescoes, as well as a late Renaissance church. In 1783 the family received the title of Prince from the Holy Roman Emperor. The continued existence of the family is noted among charts of the Princely Houses of Poland.

In 1882 the villages Zalavas and Kavarskas were bought by Michał Ogiński, an heir to the Ogiński family that had owned it in the eighteenth century. They also temporarily possessed Siedlce. They were the sponsors of Eastern Orthodox editions in Ruthenian and Slavonic languages. Orthodox publicists called the clan of Oginski "the bastion of Orthodox faith". The last orthodox magnate, Marcjan Aleksander Ogiński had to choose between Roman Catholic and Greek Catholic Church.

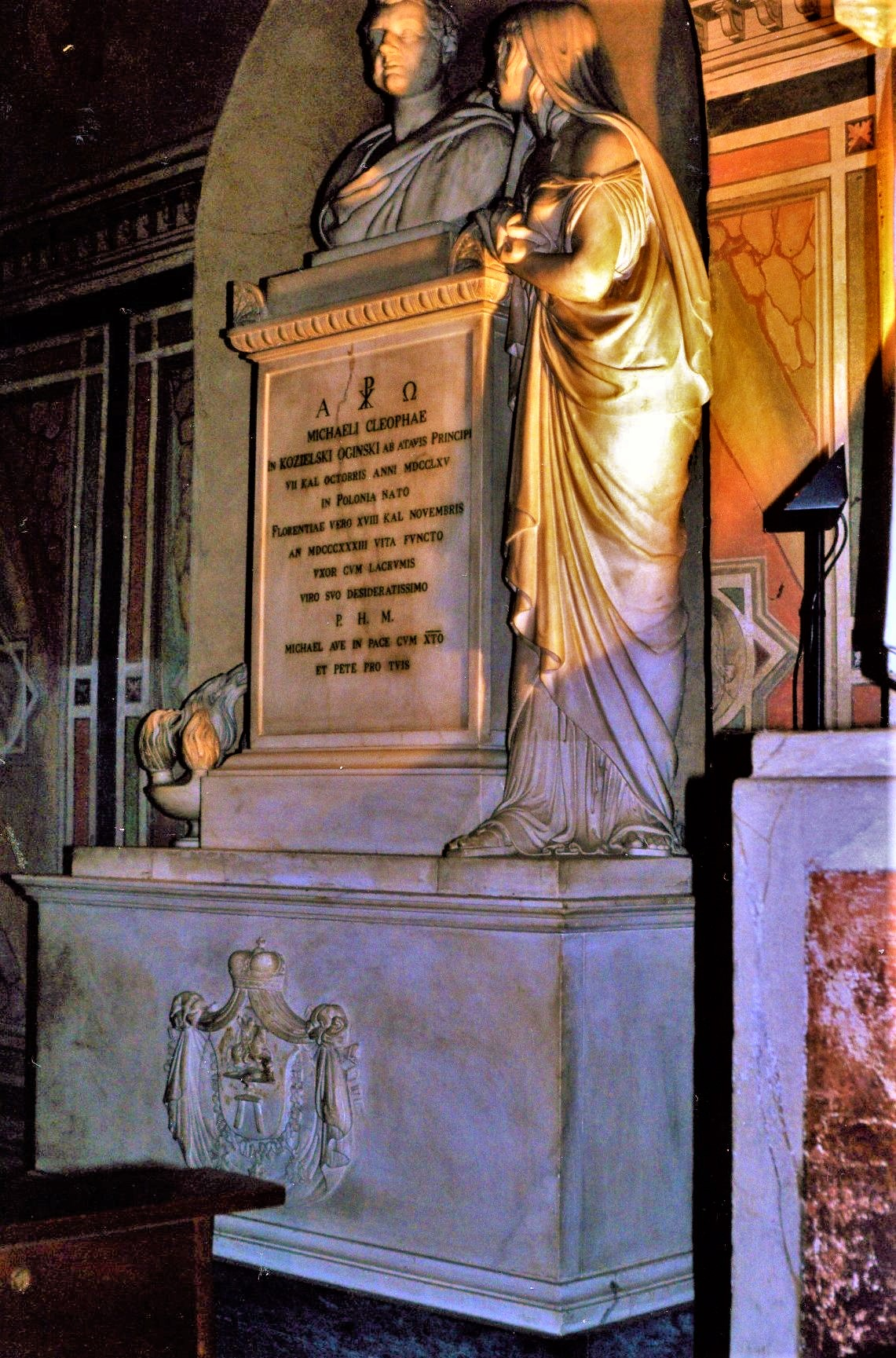
Tomb of Michal Kleofas Oginski Basilica of Santa Croce, Florence

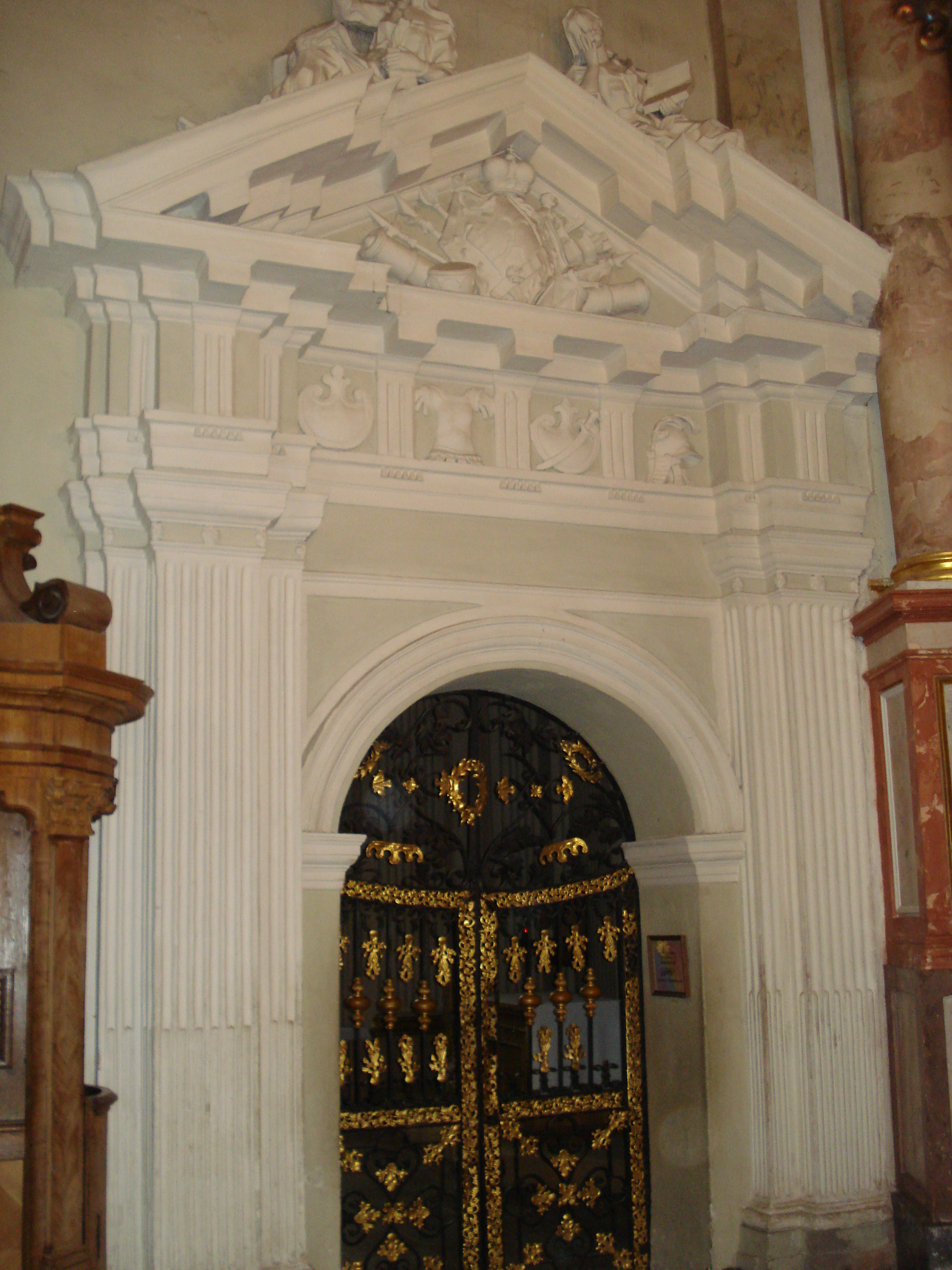
Oginski Chapel in the Church of St. Johns (Vilnius)

== Coat of arms ==
The House of Ogiński used the Brama Coat of Arms.

== Notable family members ==
- Jan Samuelowicz Ogiński (1619–1684), Field Hetman of Lithuania, married Anna Siemiaszko
- Marcjan Aleksander Ogiński (1632–1690), Grand Chancellor of Lithuania, voivode of Trakai, married Marcybella Anna Hlebowicz h. Leliwa and Konstancja Krystyna Wielopolska h. Starykoń
- Grzegorz Antoni Ogiński (1654–1709), Grand Hetman of Lithuania, married Teofilia Czartoryska h. Czartoryski
- Aleksander Ogiński (? – 1667), last orthodox senator of General sejm, Banner Bearer of Trakai Voivodeship, married NN Szemet and Katarzyna Połubińska h. Jastrzębiec,
- Samuel Ogiński (? – 1657), courtier, royal rotmistrz, stolnik and ciwun of Troki, married Zofia Bielewicz
- Ludwik Karol Ogiński (1618–1718), Bishop of Smoleńsk
- Ignacy Ogiński (c. 1698–1775), Grand Marshal of Lithuania, diplomat, married Helena Ogińska
- Marcjan Michał Ogiński (1672–1750), voivode of Witebsk, married Teresa Brzostowska h. Strzemię, Teresa Tyzenhaus h. Bawół, Krystyna Abramowicz na Wornianach h. Jastrzębiec and Tekla Anna Larska
- Tadeusz Franciszek Ogiński (1712–1783), senator, speaker of the Sejm, voivode of Troki, married Izeballa Radziwiłł h. Trąby and Jadwiga Załuska h. Junosza
- Michał Kazimierz Ogiński (1730–1800), Grand Hetman of Lithuania, senator and composer, married Aleksandra Czartoryska h. Czartoryski
- Andrzej Ignacy Ogiński (1740–1787), voivode of Troki, diplomat, married Paula Szembek h. Szembek
- Michał Kleofas Ogiński (1765–1833), son of the above, Grand Treasurer of Lithuania, senator and composer, author of the polonaise, Farewell to the Fatherland, married Izabela Lasocka h. Dołęga and Marie de Neri
- Amelia Załuska (1805–1858), composer, poet and painter, married Count Teofil Karol Załuski h. Junosza

== Palaces and Manors ==
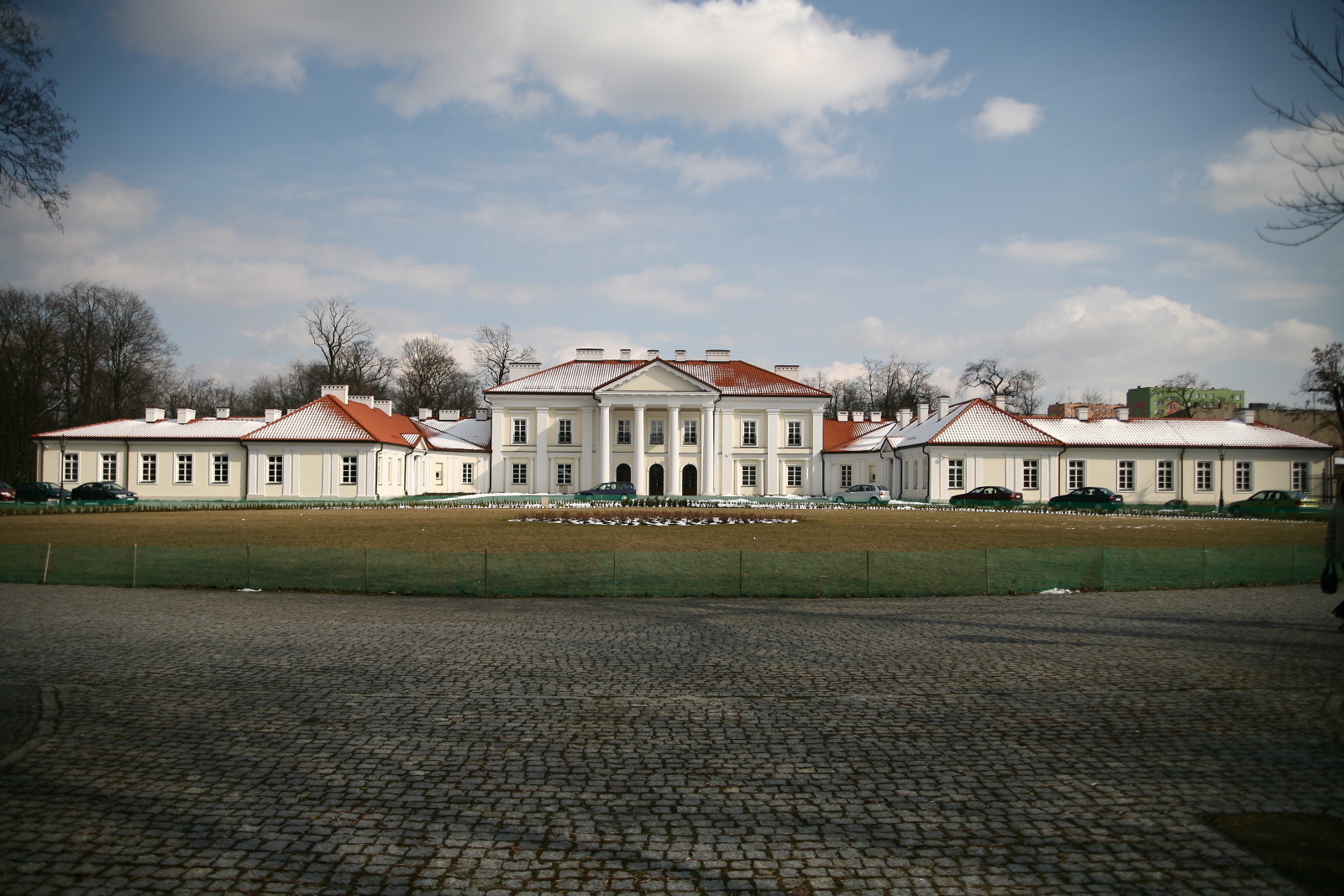
Ogiński Palace in Siedlce

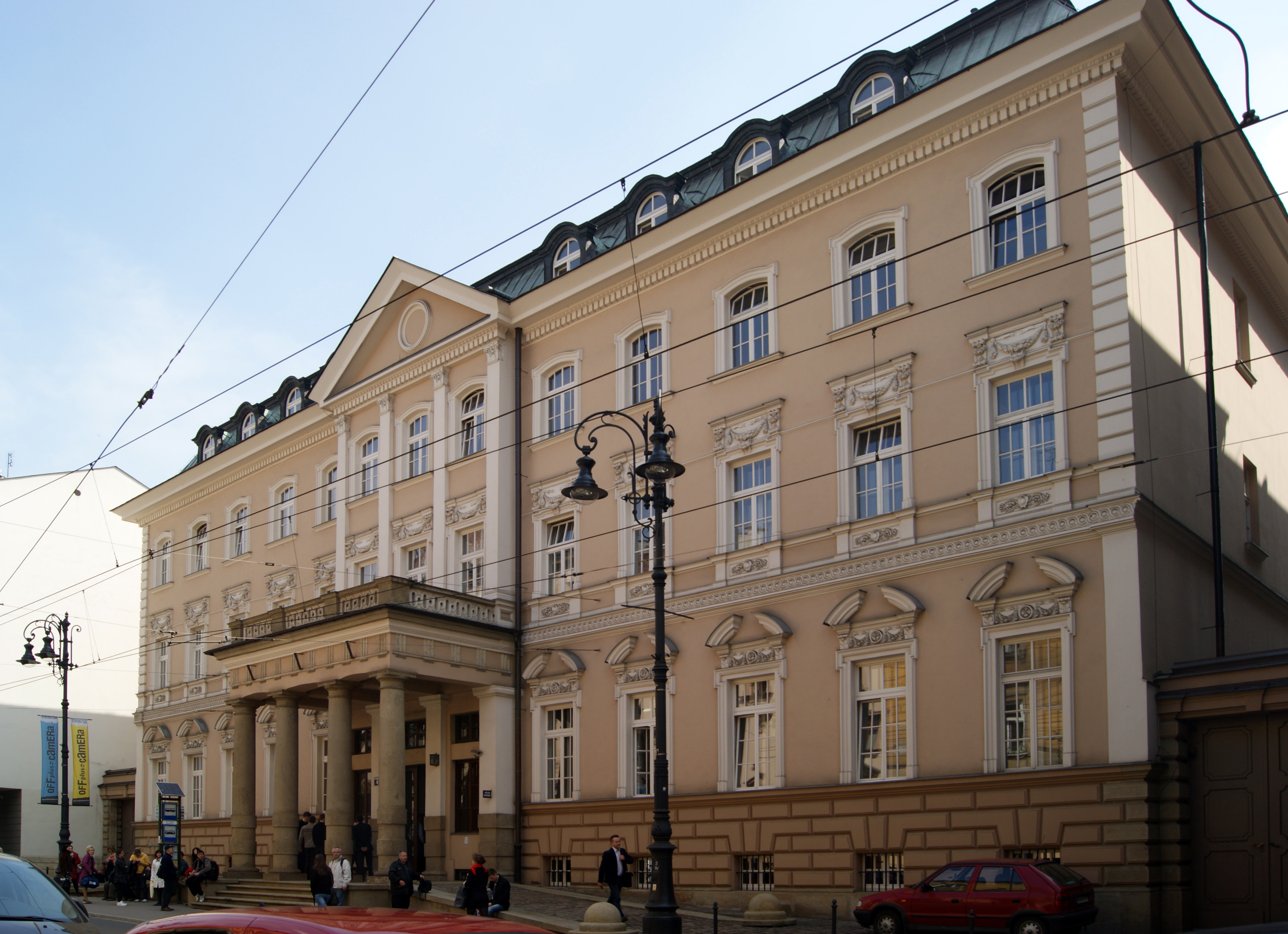
Palace of Ogiński and Potulicki family in Kraków

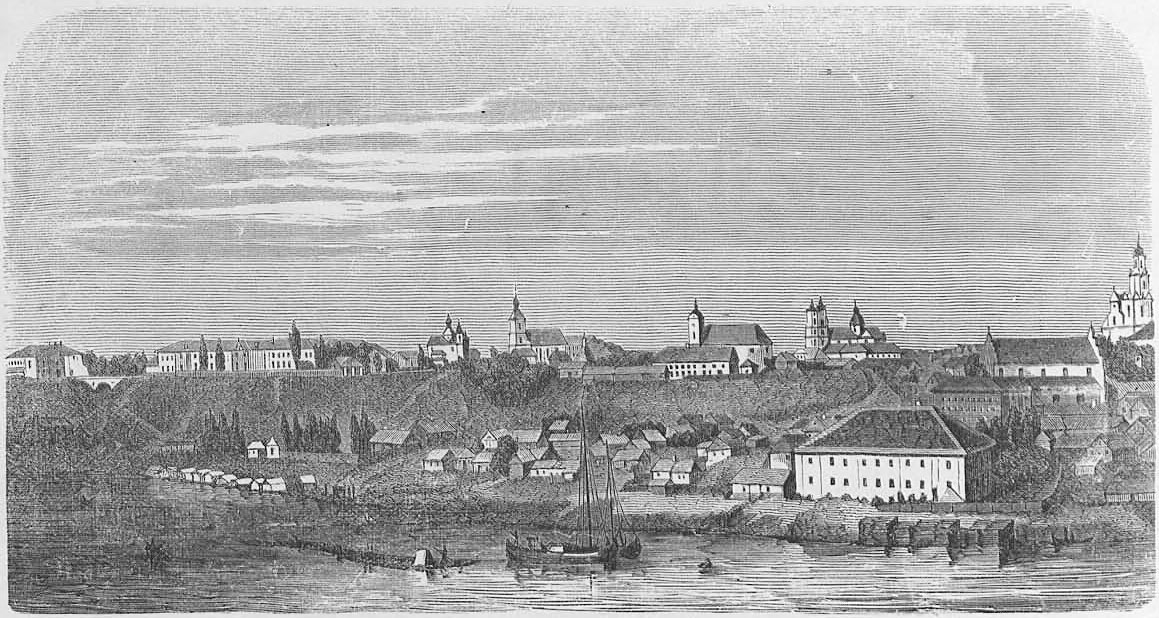
Palace in Grodno (on the bottom, left side)

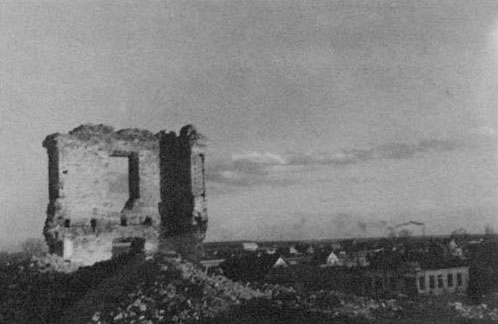
Palace in Słonim (ruin)

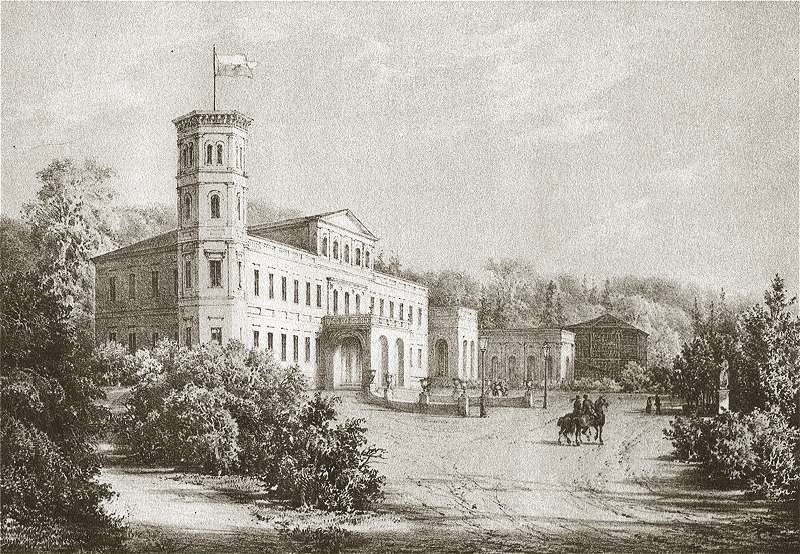
Palace in Rietavas (demolished)

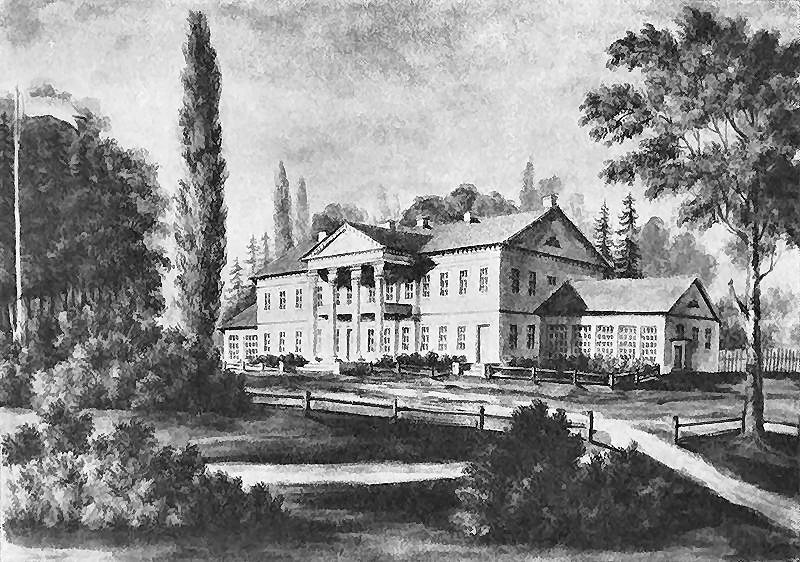
Palace in Dukora (demolished)

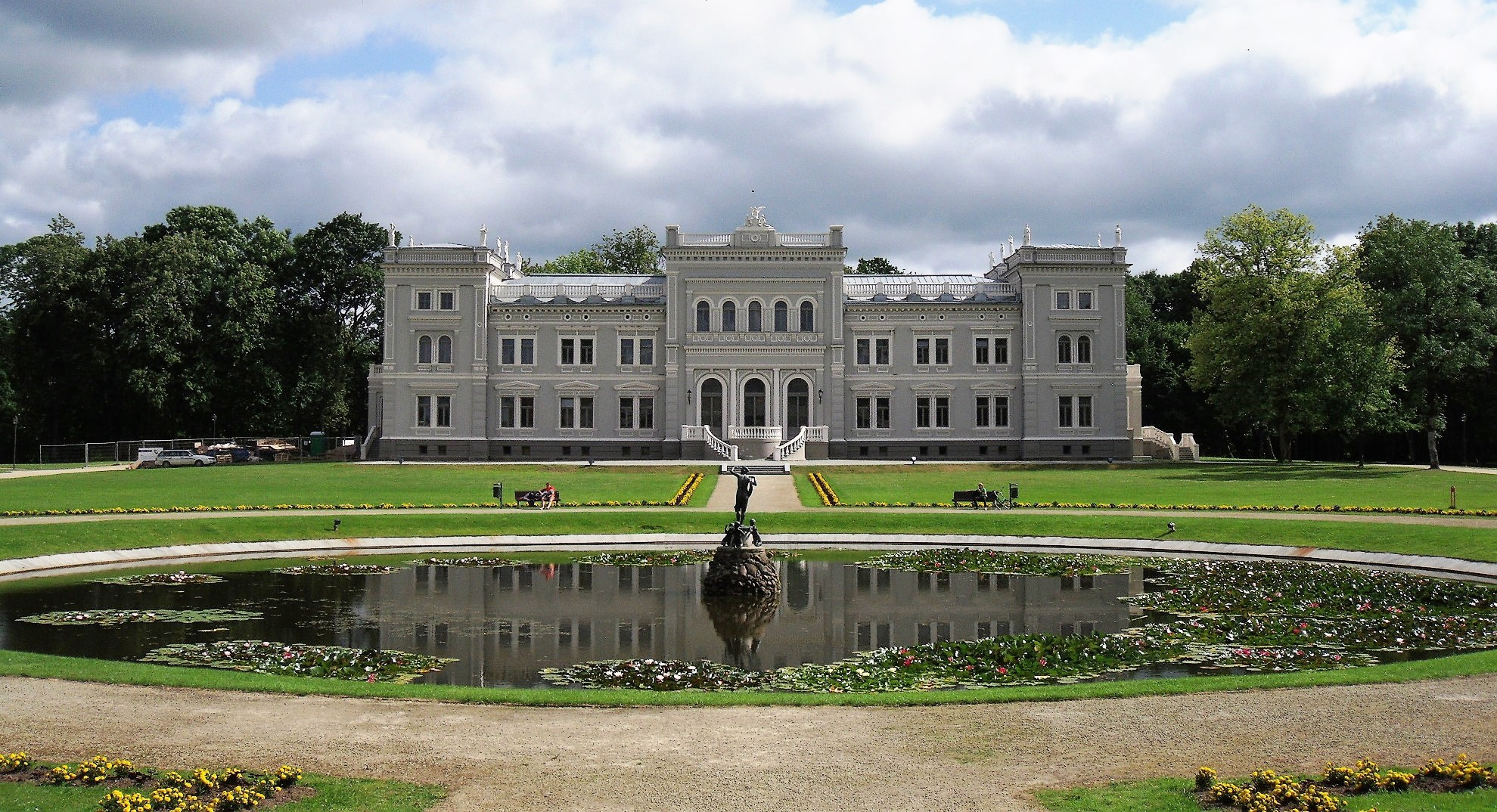
Plungė Manor

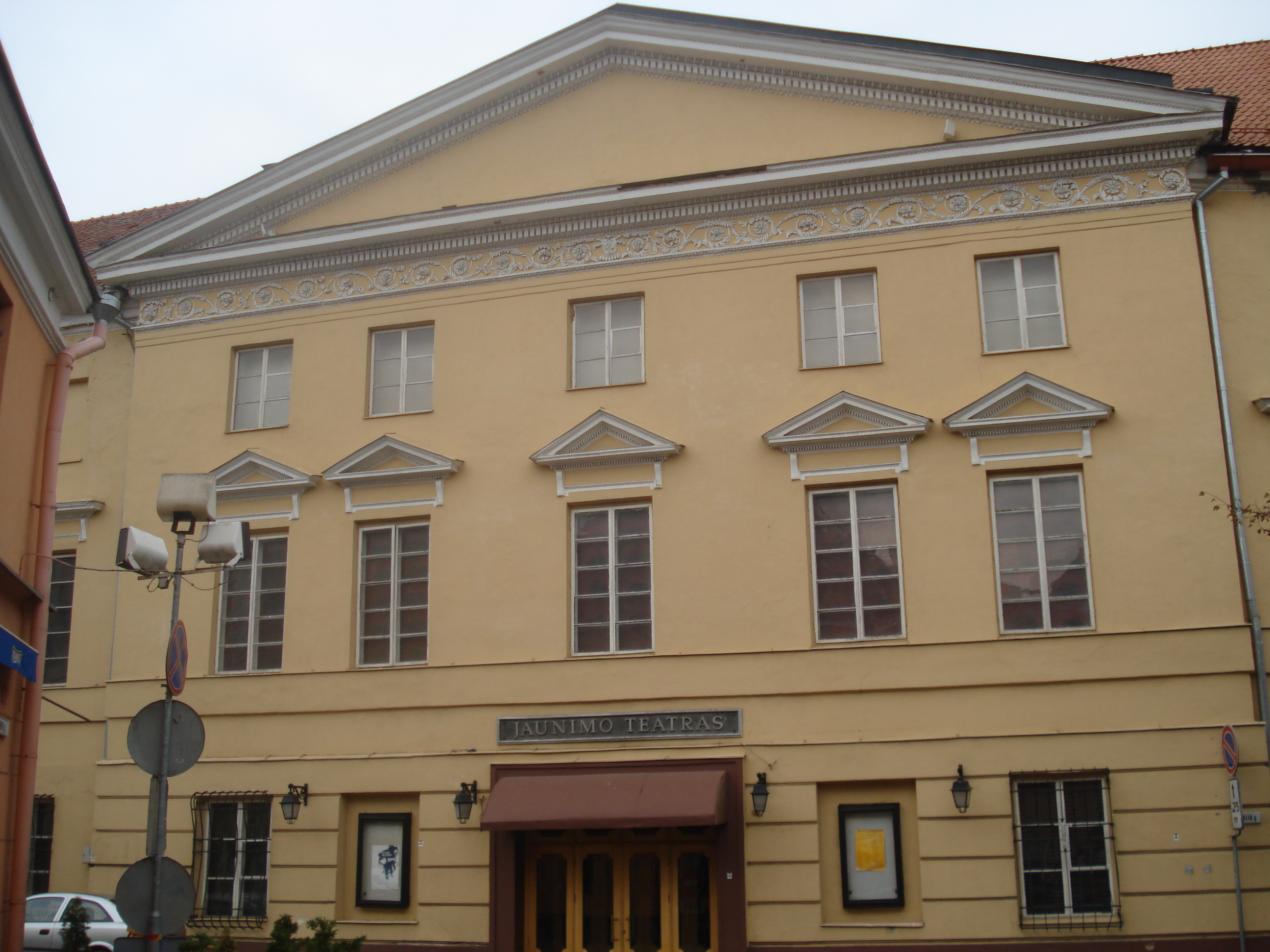
Ogiński Palace in Vilnius

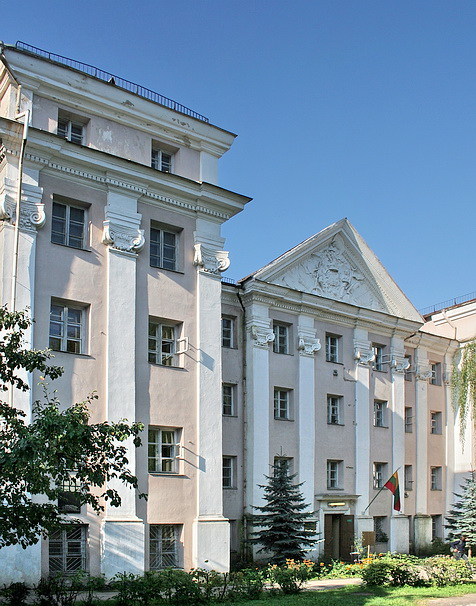
Slushko Palace

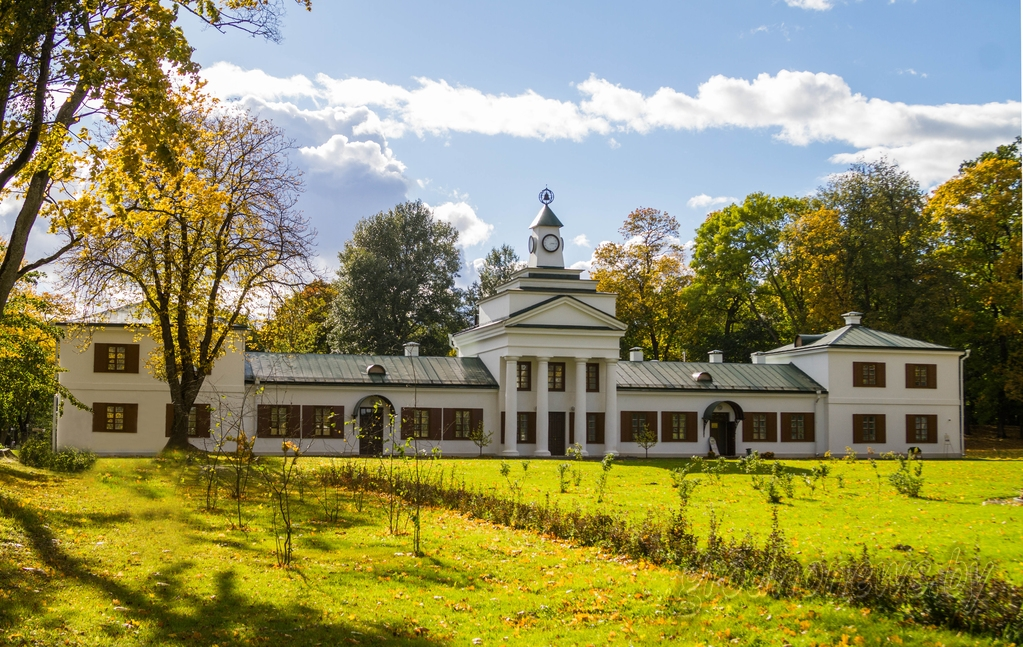
Ahinski Manor in Zaliessie

== See also ==
- Grand Duchy of Lithuania
- Lithuanian nobility
- List of szlachta
