= Ahinski Manor in Zaliessie =

Culturally-significant building in Zaliessie, Belarus

Ahinski manor in Zaliessie
- Сядзіба Агінскіх у Залесьсі
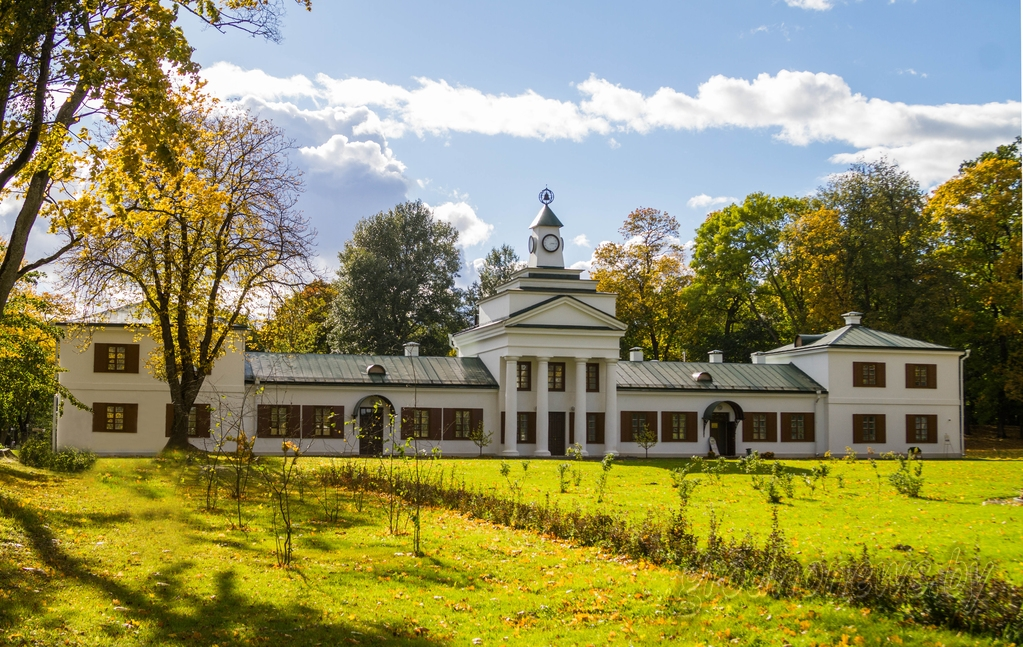

General information
- Architectural style: Classicism
- Location: the village of Zaliessie, Smarhon district, Belarus
- Coordinates: 54.419933°N 26.523333°E
- Completed: 1815

Design and construction
- Architect: Michał Szulc

Website
- www.oginskizalesse.by

The Ahinski Manor (Belarusian: Сядзіба Агінскіх у Залесьсі) is an early-nineteenth-century country house located in the village of Zaliessie (also Zalesse), Smarhon district in Belarus.

== Early years of the estate ==
The estate was originally acquired by the Ahinski (Oginski) family in the early eighteenth century. At that time it included a wooden palace, farmyard, pond, mill and a brewery. It had passed through several generations until the early nineteenth century when it was bequeathed to Michał Kleofas Ogiński.

== Under ownership of Michał Kleofas Ogiński ==
Michał Kleofas Ogiński, who had been in exile since the defeat of the Kościuszko uprising, returned to the Russian Empire in 1802, following an amnesty by the Tzar. He settled in the Zaliessie estate and began construction of a new stone manor house in a classicist style by architect Michał Szulc.

The works completed by 1815 and included a park in the style of Romanticism with trails and bridges across the local river.

Under the ownership of Ogiński the manor became a venue for musical concerts and literary events and was described as 'Northern Athens' by contemporaries. In Zaliessie, Michał Kleofas Ogiński created many of his works. The famous polonaise in A minor Farewell to the Homeland however, which is commonly attributed to Ogiński, is no longer considered a composition of him accourding to recent research.

== After Michał Kleofas Ogiński ==
After the death of Michał Kleofas Ogiński, the estate was owned by several generations of his descendants. It fell on hard times in 1924 and was broken up and sold outside the family.

In Soviet Belarus the estate was used as a holiday resort and a nursing home.

At the beginning of the twenty-first century the manor was in a poor state; however, between 2011 and 2015, large scale restoration works were undertaken.

A museum dedicated to the life and work of Michał Kleofas Ogiński was opened on the premises after completion of the restoration.

== Gallery ==
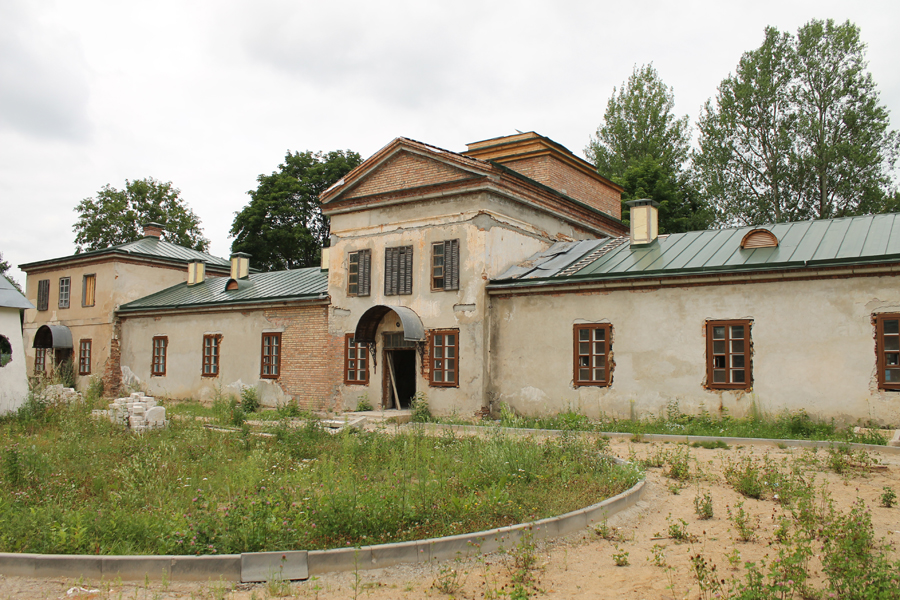
Restoration works

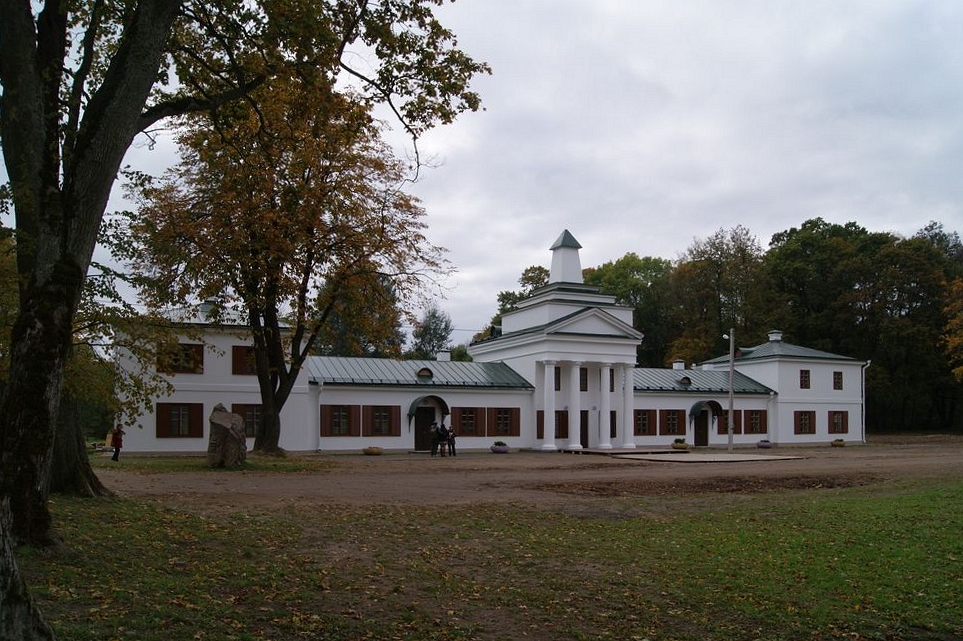
Palace

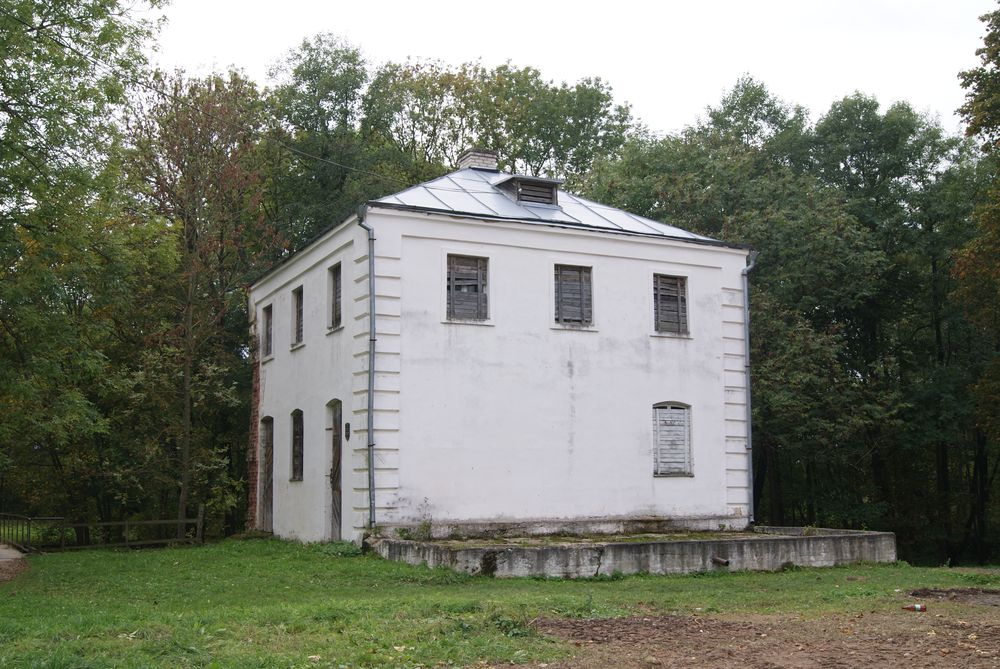
Mill

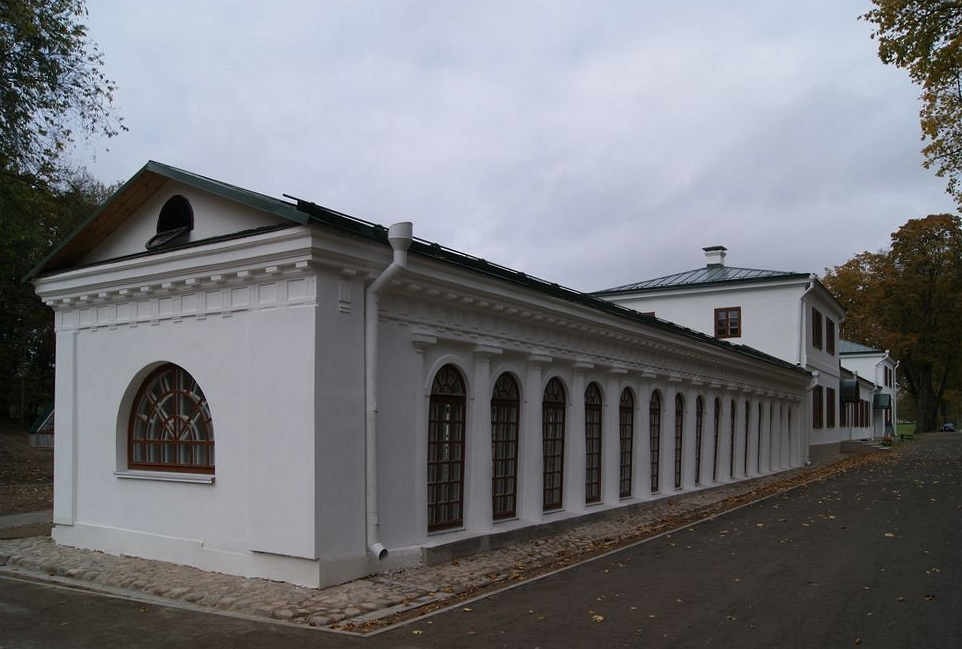
Orangery

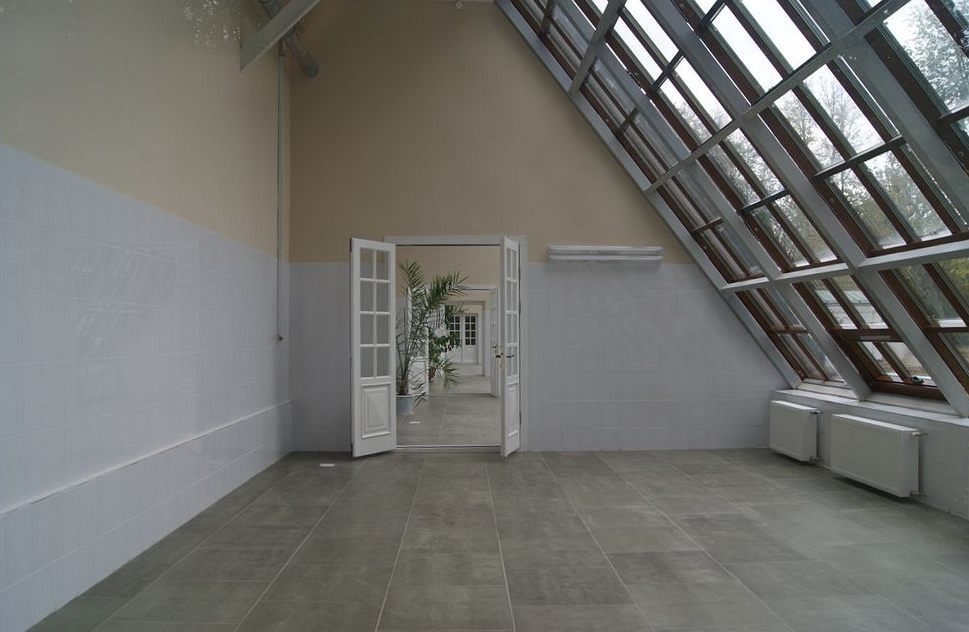
"American" Orangery

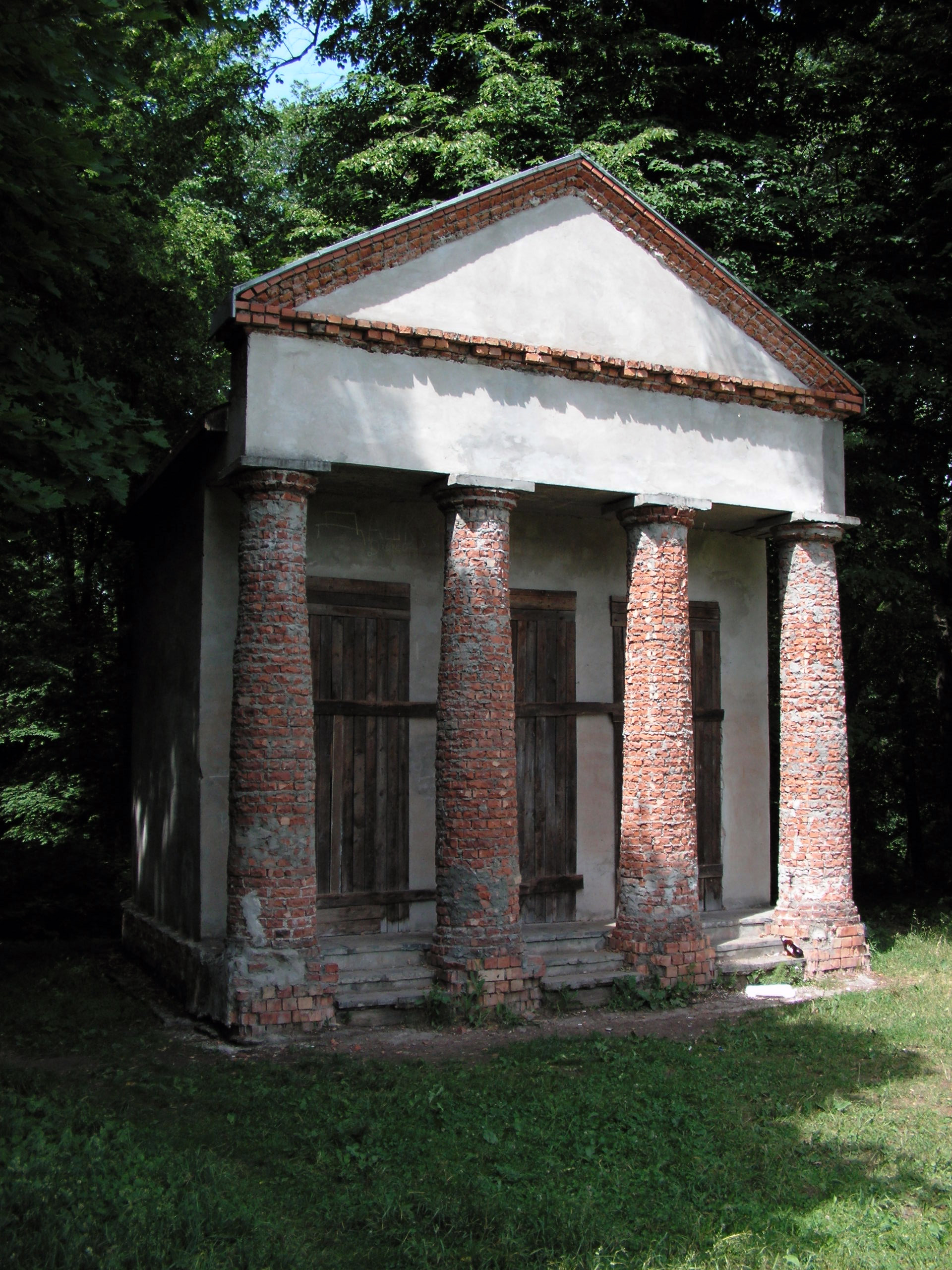
Amelia's Gazebo

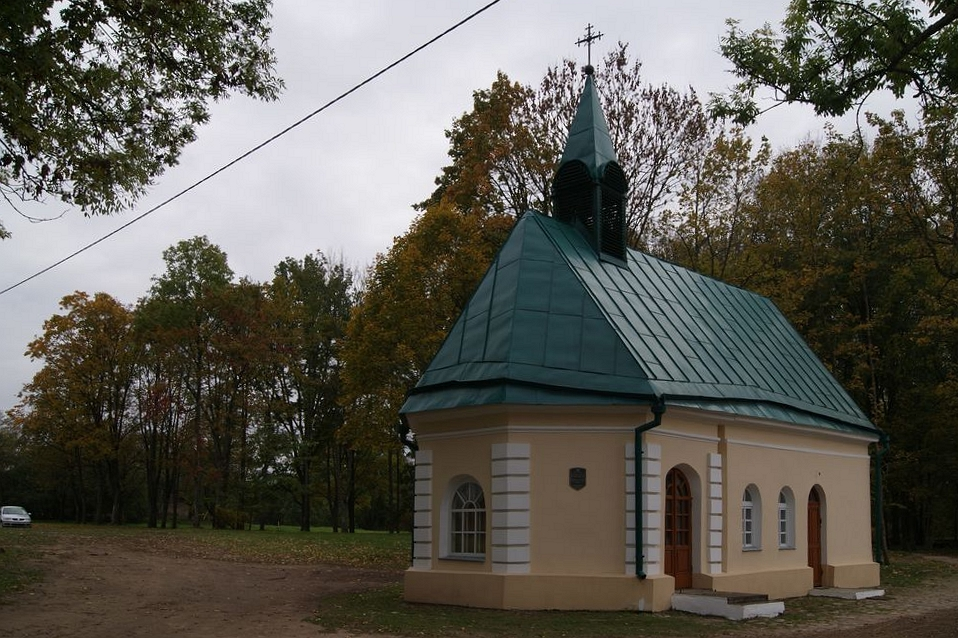
St Mary's Chapel

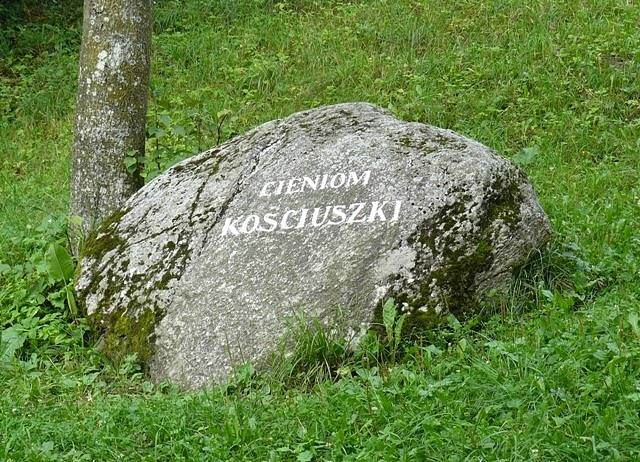
Kościuszko memorial stone
