= Michał Kazimierz Ogiński =

Polish nobleman (c. 1728 – c. 1800)

Michał Kazimierz Ogiński Grand Hetman of Lithuania
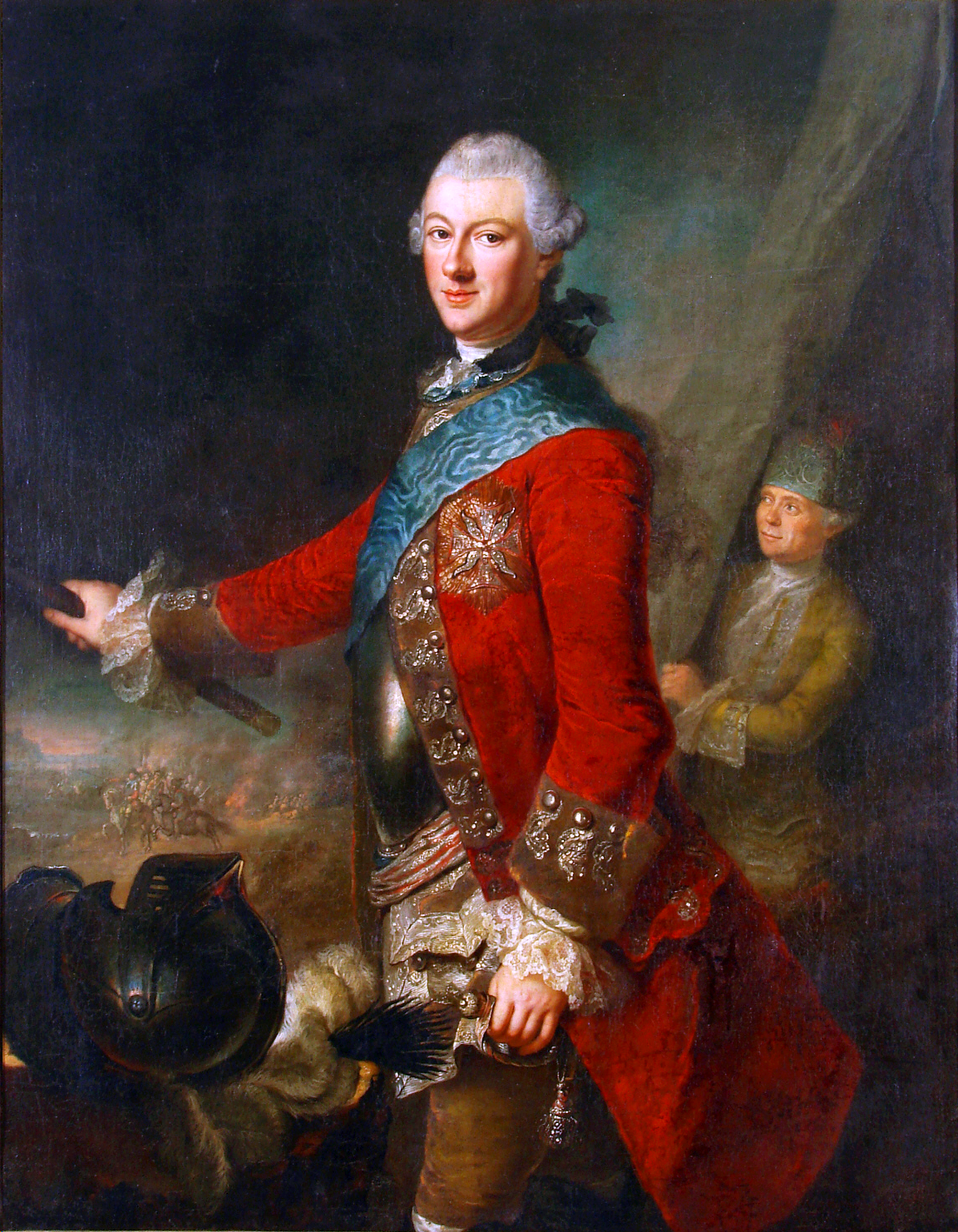
- Portrait by Anna Rosina de Gasc, 1755
- Born: c. 1728; Warsaw, Polish–Lithuanian Commonwealth
- Died: May 31, 1800; Slonim, Russian Empire
- Spouse: Aleksandra Czartoryska
- Parents: Józef Tadeusz Ogiński (father); Anna Wiśniowiecka (mother)

Michał Kazimierz Ogiński (c. 1728 – 1800) was a Polish–Lithuanian nobleman, politician, musician, composer and military officer.

== Biography ==
Michał Kazimierz Ogiński's parents were Józef Jan Ogiński, Voivode of Trakai, and Anna née Wiśniowiecka, daughter of Michał Serwacy Wiśniowiecki, Lithuanian Grand Hetman.

He began his political career at the age of 18, when he became the Field Writer of Lithuania, a mid-level position in the administration of the State. In 1764 he became one of Russia's candidates for the Polish throne. When Stanisław August Poniatowski was chosen instead, he was made Palatine (or Voïvode) of Vilnius. In 1768 he was nominated to the rank of the Grand Hetman of Lithuania, thus becoming one of two highest-ranking military commanders in the Polish–Lithuanian state. He later joined the anti-Russian Bar Confederation. After some initial successes, he was defeated in September 1771 by the Russian forces under Alexander Suvorov in the Battle of Stołowicze, forcing him into exile, notably in Paris between 1772 and 1774, and his properties were confiscated. He was allowed to return in 1774, and three years later Russia returned some of his properties to him. During the Great Sejm of 1788–1791, Ogiński was a member of the Patriotic Party. However, following the defeat of his faction in the Polish–Russian War of 1792, he resigned his post and retired to his family manor in Słonim.

Apart from his political and military career, he was a noted engineer and musician. He helped to establish the Pińsk–Volhynia road, the arsenal in Vilnius, and the Oginski Canal, which joined the watersheds of the Neman and Dnieper rivers (1765-1784). He also founded numerous factories and foundries in the lands belonging to his family. He was also a noted musician and composer, as well as a benefactor of artists. At his court in Słonim he held two theater groups (Italian and Polish), a printing house and orchestra. He also modified the design of the harp and wrote several musical compositions. He was among two Polish scholars (alongside Jan Szczepan Kurdwanowski) who contributed to the French Encyclopédie. He was a cousin of Andrzej Ignacy, the father of composer Michał Kleofas Ogiński, and it is possible that many of the polonaises composed by him can be attributed to Michał Kazimierz, including the famous Farewell to My Homeland.

Michał Kazimierz Ogiński was the first owner of Rembrandt's painting The Polish Rider.

== Honours ==
- Order of the White Eagle, Poland
- Order of Saint Stanislaus, Poland
- Order of St. Andrew, Russian Empire
- Order of Saint Alexander Nevsky, Russian Empire
- Order of the Black Eagle, Prussia

== Works ==
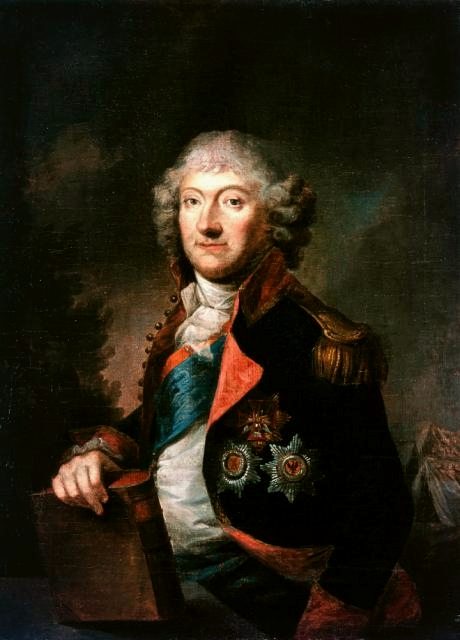
Michał Kazimierz Ogiński

He was the author of literary works published under the pseudonym Słonimski.

- Żarty dowcipne dla czytelnika z różnych autorów zebrane (1780)
- Xiążka in Octavo majori (1781)
- Powieści historyczne i moralne (1782)
- Bayki i niebayki (1788)
- Noc Jungia – poem (1788)

Comedies:

- fr.: La fête du jour de nom (pol.: "Uczta imieninowa") - 1784

Operas:

- Opuszczone dzieci – 1771, Słonim
- Filozof zmieniony – 1771, Słonim
- Telemak – 1780
- Kondycje stanów – 1781, Słonim
- Pola Elizejskie – drama with composed music – 1781, Słonim
- Cyganie – 1786, Siedlce
- Mocy Świata – before 1788, Słonim

Songs:

- Do Temiry – 1788

== See also ==
- Enlightenment in Poland
- Michał Kleofas Ogiński
- Marcjan Aleksander Ogiński
