= Żydy =

Żydy may refer to:

- Żydy, Masovian Voivodeship, Poland
- Żydy, Warmian-Masurian Voivodeship, Poland
