= Jan Stefan Ligenza Kurdwanowski =

Polish physicist

Jan Stefan Ligenza Kurdwanowski (also Jan Szczepan Kurdwanowski; 1680–1780) was a Polish physicist, member of the Prussian Academy of Sciences and military officer. A contributor to Encyclopédie, he served as a courtier to king Stanisław Leszczyński and his wife.

== Biography ==
Kurdwanowski was born 26 December 1680 in his family's manor in Radzanów, to a Polish gentry family. His father held the title of łowczy at the Polish court. Kurdwanowski himself was also attached to the King of Poland Stanislas Leszczyński, and held the title of gentleman of the bedchamber.

He was also an elected member of the Prussian Academy of Sciences since 28 June 1753. While not a member of the Société des gens de lettres, Kurdwanowski contributed an article on Piles (heaps of objects) to the Encyclopédie. His article explained a simple method of counting round, piled objects such as cannonballs. His article was then further expanded by Louis de Jaucourt and Guillaume Le Blond. He was one of two Polish contributors to that encyclopaedia, the other being prince Michał Kazimierz Ogiński who wrote the article on Lyre.

When king Stanislas assumed the throne of Lorraine and Bar, Kurdwanowski followed him to France and remained his courtier there and later of his wife, queen Catherine Opalińska. His wife was Zofia Salomea née Miłkowska.

Later in his life he joined the French Royal Army in the rank of captain and commander of a battalion of infantry. With time he rose through the ranks and was eventually promoted to the rank of lieutenant colonel. He died 21 June 1780 in Lunéville, aged 99.
