= Branica, Masovian Voivodeship =

Branica
- Village
- Location within Poland
- Coordinates: 51°36′N 20°55′E
- Country: Poland
- Voivodeship: Masovian
- County: Białobrzegi
- Gmina: Radzanów

Branica [braˈnit͡sa] is a village in the administrative district of Gmina Radzanów, within Białobrzegi County, Masovian Voivodeship, in east-central Poland.
