= Zacharzów =

- Village
- Location within Poland
- Coordinates: 51°35′N 20°52′E
- Country: Poland
- Voivodeship: Masovian
- County: Białobrzegi
- Gmina: Radzanów
- Elevation: 160 m (520 ft)
- Population: 147

Zacharzów [zaˈxaʐuf] is a village in the administrative district of Gmina Radzanów, within Białobrzegi County, Masovian Voivodeship, in east-central Poland.
