= Wólka Kadłubska =

- Village
- Location within Poland
- Coordinates: 51°33′46″N 20°54′15″E
- Country: Poland
- Voivodeship: Masovian
- County: Białobrzegi
- Gmina: Radzanów

Wólka Kadłubska [ˈvulka kadˈwupska] is a village in the administrative district of Gmina Radzanów, within Białobrzegi County, Masovian Voivodeship, in east-central Poland.
