= Podgórze, Białobrzegi County =

Podgórze
- Village
- Location within Poland
- Coordinates: 51°34′14″N 20°48′15″E
- Country: Poland
- Voivodeship: Masovian
- County: Białobrzegi
- Gmina: Radzanów
- Population: 40

Podgórze [pɔdˈɡuʐɛ] is a village in the administrative district of Gmina Radzanów, within Białobrzegi County, Masovian Voivodeship, in east-central Poland.
