= Młodynie Górne =

- Village
- Location within Poland
- Coordinates: 51°32′14″N 20°52′22″E
- Country: Poland
- Voivodeship: (Masovian Voivodeship) Masovian
- County: Białobrzegi
- Gmina: Radzanów

Młodynie Górne [mwɔˈdɨɲɛ ˈɡurnɛ] is a village in the administrative district of Gmina Radzanów, within Białobrzegi County, Masovian Voivodeship, in east-central Poland.
