= Ocieść =

- Village
- Location within Poland
- Coordinates: 51°31′56″N 20°47′21″E
- Country: Poland
- Voivodeship: Masovian
- County: Białobrzegi
- Gmina: Radzanów
- Population: 210

Ocieść [ˈɔt͡ɕɛɕt͡ɕ] is a village in the administrative district of Gmina Radzanów, within Białobrzegi County, Masovian Voivodeship, in east-central Poland.
