= Gmina Radzanów, Białobrzegi County =

Gmina Radzanów Radzanów Commune
- Gmina
- Interactive map of Gmina Radzanów
- Coordinates (Radzanów): 51°33′0″N 20°51′0″E
- Country: Poland
- Voivodeship: Masovian
- County: Białobrzegi
- Seat: Radzanów

Area
  - Total: 82.59 km^{2} (31.89 sq mi)

Population (2006)
  - Total: 3,888
  - Density: 47.08/km^{2} (121.9/sq mi)
- Website: www.radzanow.pl

Gmina Radzanów is a rural gmina (administrative district) in Białobrzegi County, Masovian Voivodeship, in east-central Poland. Its seat is the village of Radzanów, which lies approximately 14 kilometres (9 mi) south-west of Białobrzegi and 75 km (47 mi) south of Warsaw.

The gmina covers an area of 82.59 square kilometres (31.9 sq mi), and as of 2006 its total population is 3,888.

== Villages ==
Gmina Radzanów contains the villages and settlements of Błeszno, Branica, Bukówno, Czarnocin, Grabina, Grotki, Kadłubska Wola, Kępina, Kozłów, Ludwików, Łukaszów, Młodynie Dolne, Młodynie Górne, Ocieść, Podgórze, Podlesie, Ratoszyn, Radzanów, Rogolin, Śliwiny, Smardzew, Wólka Kadłubska, Zacharzów and Żydy.

== Neighbouring gminas ==
Gmina Radzanów is bordered by the gminas of Białobrzegi, Potworów, Przytyk, Stara Błotnica and Wyśmierzyce.
