= Podlesie, Białobrzegi County =

Podlesie
- Village
- Location within Poland
- Coordinates: 51°33′49″N 20°46′45″E
- Country: Poland
- Voivodeship: Masovian
- County: Białobrzegi
- Gmina: Radzanów

Population
  - Total: 100
- Time zone: UTC+1 (CET)
  - Summer (DST): UTC+2 (CEST)

Podlesie [pɔdˈlɛɕɛ] is a village in the administrative district of Gmina Radzanów, within Białobrzegi County, Masovian Voivodeship, in east-central Poland.

Thirteen Polish citizens were murdered by Nazi Germany in the village during World War II.
