= Ludwików, Białobrzegi County =

Ludwików
- Village
- Location within Poland
- Coordinates: 51°34′22″N 20°50′34″E
- Country: Poland
- Voivodeship: Masovian
- County: Białobrzegi
- Gmina: Radzanów

Ludwików [ludˈvikuf] is a village in the administrative district of Gmina Radzanów, within Białobrzegi County, Masovian Voivodeship, in east-central Poland.
