= Radzanów, Białobrzegi County =

Radzanów
- Village
- Location within Poland
- Coordinates: 51°33′N 20°51′E
- Country: Poland
- Voivodeship: Masovian
- County: Białobrzegi
- Gmina: Radzanów
- Elevation: 154 m (505 ft)
- Population: 356

Radzanów [raˈd͡zanuf] is a village in Białobrzegi County, Masovian Voivodeship, in east-central Poland. It is the seat of the gmina (administrative district) called Gmina Radzanów.

The physicist Jan Stefan Ligenza Kurdwanowski, member of the Prussian Academy of Sciences, military officer and contributor to the Encyclopédie, was born in the village.
