= Kozłów, Gmina Radzanów =

Kozłów
- Village
- Location within Poland
- Coordinates: 51°32′38″N 20°49′30″E
- Country: Poland
- Voivodeship: Masovian
- County: Białobrzegi
- Gmina: Radzanów
- Population: 100

Kozłów [ˈkɔzwuf] is a village in the administrative district of Gmina Radzanów, within Białobrzegi County, Masovian Voivodeship, in east-central Poland.
