= Młodynie Dolne =

- Village
- Location within Poland
- Coordinates: 51°32′N 20°53′E
- Country: Poland
- Voivodeship: Masovian
- County: Białobrzegi
- Gmina: Radzanów

Młodynie Dolne [mwɔˈdɨɲɛ ˈdɔlnɛ] is a village in the administrative district of Gmina Radzanów, within Białobrzegi County, Masovian Voivodeship, in east-central Poland.
