= Śliwiny, Masovian Voivodeship =

Śliwiny
- Village
- Location within Poland
- Coordinates: 51°31′27″N 20°49′57″E
- Country: Poland
- Voivodeship: Masovian
- County: Białobrzegi
- Gmina: Radzanów

Śliwiny [ɕliˈvinɨ] is a village in the administrative district of Gmina Radzanów, within Białobrzegi County, Masovian Voivodeship, in east-central Poland.
