= Grotki =

- Village
- Location within Poland
- Coordinates: 51°34′N 20°49′E
- Country: Poland
- Voivodeship: Masovian
- County: Białobrzegi
- Gmina: Radzanów
- Population: 160

Grotki [ˈɡrɔtki] is a village in the administrative district of Gmina Radzanów, within Białobrzegi County, Masovian Voivodeship, in east-central Poland.
