= Smardzew, Masovian Voivodeship =

Smardzew
- Village
- Location within Poland
- Coordinates: 51°36′N 20°54′E
- Country: Poland
- Voivodeship: Masovian
- County: Białobrzegi
- Gmina: Radzanów
- Elevation: 158 m (518 ft)
- Population: 200

Smardzew [ˈsmard͡zɛf] is a village in the administrative district of Gmina Radzanów, within Białobrzegi County, Masovian Voivodeship, in east-central Poland.
