= Czarnocin, Białobrzegi County =

Czarnocin
- Village
- Location within Poland
- Coordinates: 51°32′N 20°49′E
- Country: Poland
- Voivodeship: Masovian
- County: Białobrzegi
- Gmina: Radzanów
- Elevation: 174 m (571 ft)

Population
  - Total: 297
- Postal code: 26-807

Czarnocin [t͡ʂarˈnɔt͡ɕin] is a village in the administrative district of Gmina Radzanów, within Białobrzegi County, Masovian Voivodeship, in east-central Poland.
