= Łukaszów, Masovian Voivodeship =

Łukaszów
- Village
- Location within Poland
- Coordinates: 51°32′16″N 20°46′28″E
- Country: Poland
- Voivodeship: Masovian
- County: Białobrzegi
- Gmina: Radzanów

Łukaszów [wuˈkaʂuf] is a village in the administrative district of Gmina Radzanów, within Białobrzegi County, Masovian Voivodeship, in east-central Poland.
