= Kępina, Białobrzegi County =

Kępina
- Village
- Location within Poland
- Coordinates: 51°34′25″N 20°49′30″E
- Country: Poland
- Voivodeship: Masovian
- County: Białobrzegi
- Gmina: Radzanów
- Population: 50

Kępina [kɛmˈpina] is a village in the administrative district of Gmina Radzanów, within Białobrzegi County, Masovian Voivodeship, in east-central Poland.
