= Żydy, Masovian Voivodeship =

Żydy
- Village
- Location within Poland
- Coordinates: 51°33′N 20°46′E
- Country: Poland
- Voivodeship: Masovian
- County: Białobrzegi
- Gmina: Radzanów
- Elevation: 182 m (597 ft)
- Population: 87

Żydy [ˈʐɨdɨ] is a village in the administrative district of Gmina Radzanów, within Białobrzegi County, Masovian Voivodeship, in east-central Poland.

The village has a very small population of 87 people.
