= Smarhon district =

District of Grodno region, Belarus

Smarhon district Смаргонскі раён (Belarusian) Сморгонский район (Russian)
- District
- Flag Coat of arms

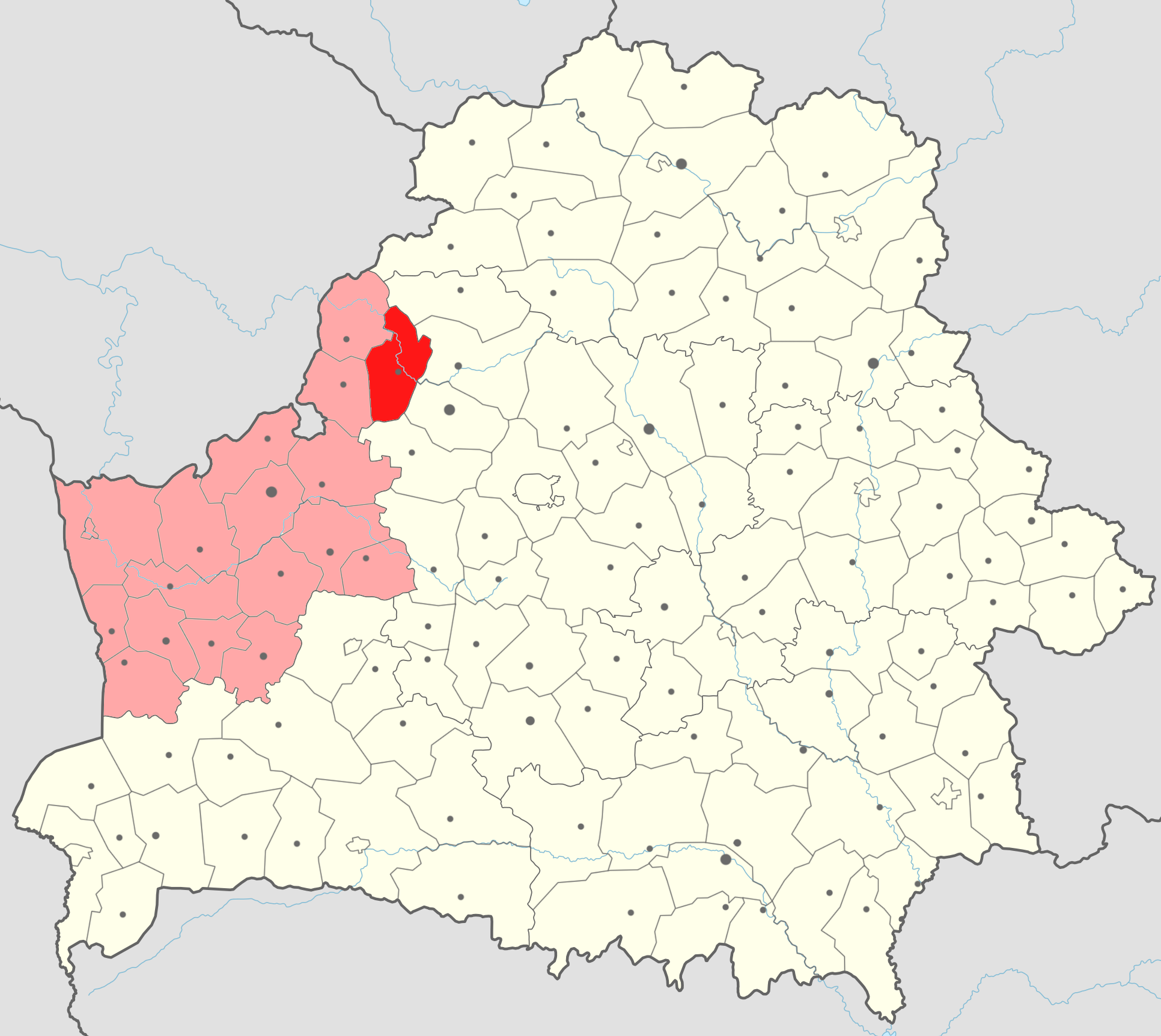
- Coordinates: 54°29′01″N 26°24′00″E
- Country: Belarus
- Region: Grodno region
- Administrative center: Smarhon

Government
  - Chairman: Henadzi Kharuzhyk

Area
  - District: 1,490.01 km^{2} (575.30 sq mi)
- Highest elevation (Note: Highest point: Milidauskaya Mountain): 320 m (1,050 ft)
- Lowest elevation (Note: Lowest point: Lowest spot on the Viliya's bank): 121 m (397 ft)

Population (2024)
  - District: 48,464
  - Density: 32.526/km^{2} (84.242/sq mi)
  - Urban: 35,422
  - Rural: 13,042
- Website: smorgon.grodno-region.by

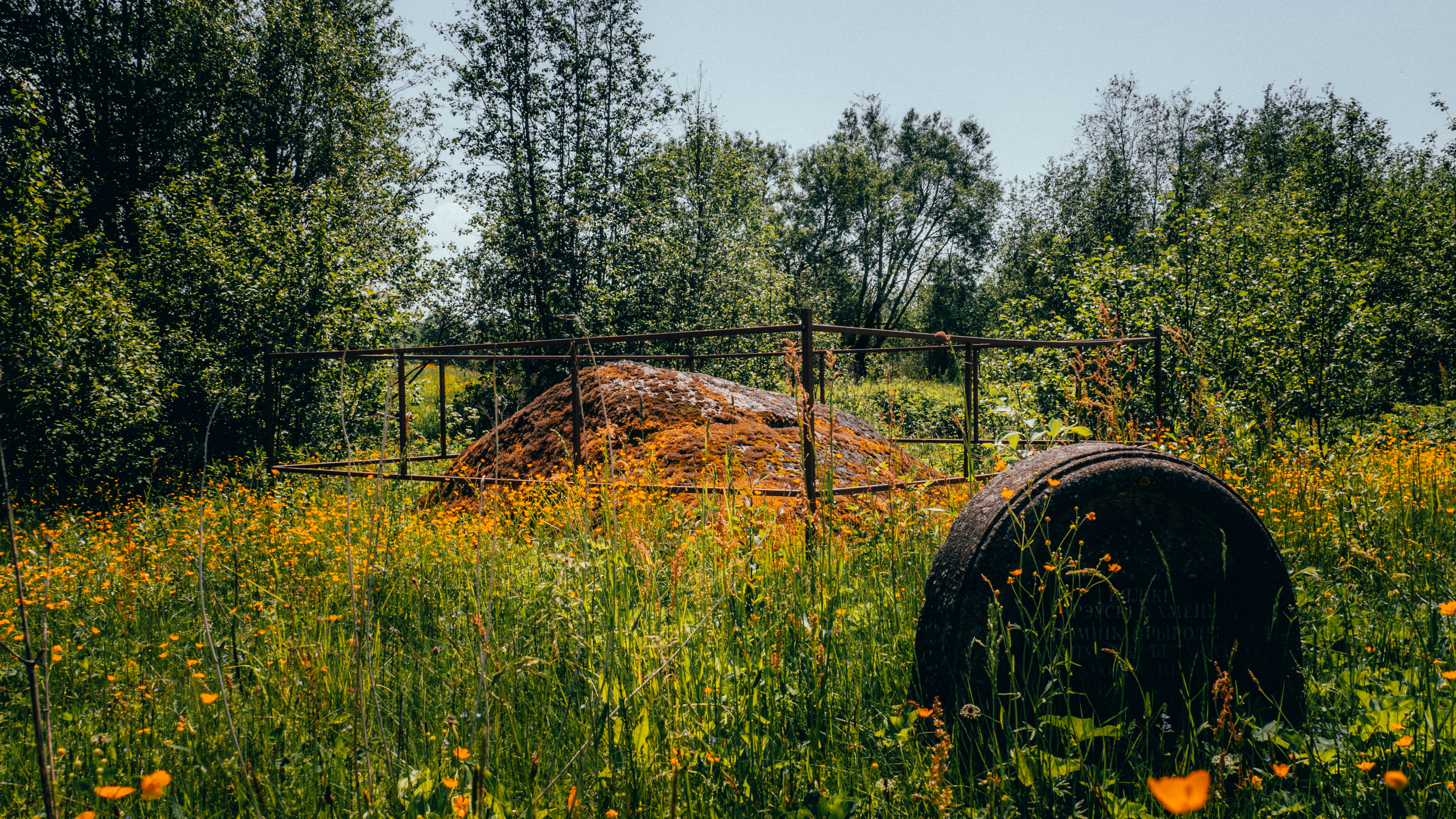
Kreŭski boulder in Smarhon district - a natural monument

Smarhon district or Smarhoń district (Belarusian: Смаргонскі раён; Russian: Сморгонский район) is a district (raion) of Grodno region in Belarus. The administrative center is Smarhon. As of 2024, it has a population of 48,464.

Historically the district's center Smarhon was part of the Vilnius Voivodeship within the Grand Duchy of Lithuania until 1795. Forty percent of the names of Smarhon district's settlements have remained of the Lithuanian origin, while residents of Smarhon once spoke in the Eastern Aukštaitian-Vilnian dialect of Lithuanian language.

== Main sights ==
- Ahinski Manor in Zaliessie

== Notable residents ==
- Adam Stankievič (1882, Arlianiaty village – 1949), Belarusian Roman Catholic priest, politician and writer, a Gulag prisoner
- Jan Stankievič (1891, Arlianiaty village – 1976), Belarusian politician, linguist, historian and philosopher
- Antoni Leszczewicz (1890, Abramaǔščyna – 1943), beautified Marian Father and Roman Catholic priest, victim of the Nazis
- Andrei Tsikota (1891–1952), Belarusian priest, member of the Rada of the Belarusian Democratic Republic and a victim of the Gulag
