= Farewell to the Homeland =

Polonaise attributed to Michał Kleofas Ogiński

Farewell to the Homeland (Polish: Pożegnanie ojczyzny, French: Les Adieux à la Patrie) or Ogiński Polonaise is a polonaise in A minor traditionally attributed to the Polish composer and statesman Michał Kleofas Ogiński. Although commonly associated with Ogiński's exile following the defeat of the Kościuszko Uprising in 1794, neither the traditional attribution nor the supposed date of composition is supported by conclusive historical evidence. Farewell to the Homeland is popular and recognizable in Russia, Poland and Belarus Recent musicological research has challenged the attribution to Ogiński. The earliest known printed arrangement dates from 1829, while the first known piano version appeared around 1831 under the name of Kacper Napoleon Wysocki. The identity of the original composer and the instrument for which the piece was initially written remain unknown.

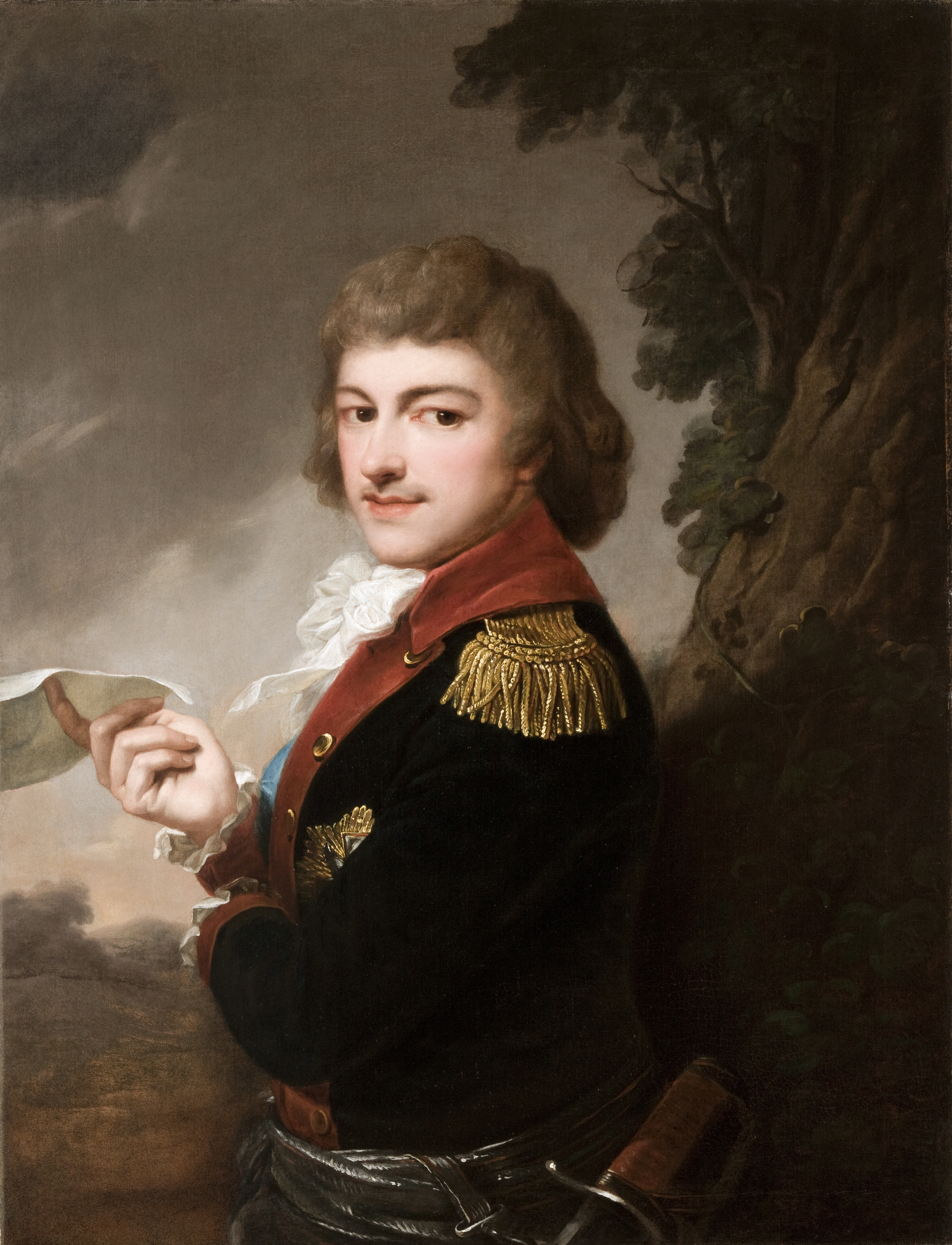
Portrait of Michał Kleofas Ogiński by Josef Grassi, c. 1782 – c. 1792

== Authenticity ==
Though the piece is commonly attributed to Ogiński, neither the autograph manuscript nor the piano publications during the composer's lifetime have survived or been found. There have also been no mentions of the polonaise in his Letters of Music (1828), where he mentioned other popular compositions of his.

Title page of the 1860 edition by J. Kaufmann and F. Hösick. This was the first appearance of the name Pożegnanie Ojczyzny.

The earliest piano version of the polonaise, c. 1831, coming from the print Marche triomphale suivie d'un Polonaise nationale, was signed by Kasper Napoleon Wysocki. The Polish name Pożegnanie Ojczyzny and the French Les adieux à la Patrie only appeared in the 1860s, after the composer's death. The French name was likely given by Antoni Kocipiński in 1859, while the Polish name was given by Józef Kaufmann after 1860. Ogiński's name appeared in the 1855 arrangement, edited by Ignacy Feliks Dobrzyński and published by Rudolf Friedlein in Warsaw.

Though Agnieszka Leszczyńska initially considered Kasper Napoleon Wysocki to be the real creator of this polonaise attributed to Michał Kleofas Ogiński, findings by Wojciech Gurgul revealed three earlier arrangements of Farewell to the Homeland, one in 1829, another in 1836, and one in 1837. Two of these were for the Russian seven-string guitar, while one was for the Spanish guitar.

Early arrangements of Farewell to the Homeland differ significantly from each other, meaning that the editors likely used different sources. WIth an exception to the main theme, parts of the polonaises have their amount of measures divisible by four. The main theme, however, has conflicting measure amounts between them.

== Popularity ==
Farewell to the Homeland
Pożegnanie Ojczyzny, played on an electric double bass (excerpt)

Polonaise Farewell
MIDI rendition based on the version edited by Ignacy F. Dobrzyński

The piece is well-known in Poland and Belarus. In the 20th century, Halina Szymulska wrote lyrics set to the melody of the polonaise. After the Fall of the Soviet Union, it was considered to make the song the national anthem of Belarus, though this idea was later abandoned.

Many Polish films used this song, including Ashes and Diamonds (director Andrzej Wajda, 1958), Mother of his Mother (director Robert Gliński, 1996), and Suicide Room (director Jan Komasa, 2011). The title of the polonaise became the title of a 1971 Soviet film named Ogiński's Polonaise (Полонез Огинсково), directed by Lev Vladimirovich Golub.

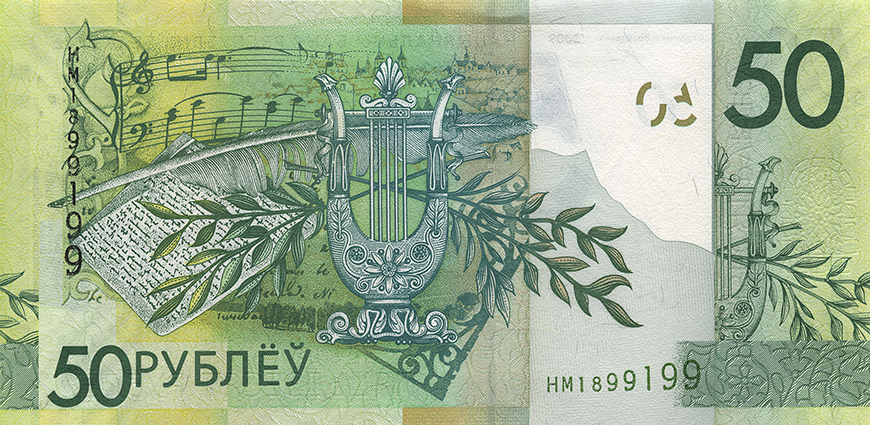
The back of the Belarusian 50-ruble banknote (2009 version) features the sixth measure of Farewell to the Homeland.

The sixth measure of the polonaise appears on the back of the Belarusian 50-ruble banknote.
