= Marcjan Aleksander Ogiński =

Polish–Lithuanian noble (1632–1690)

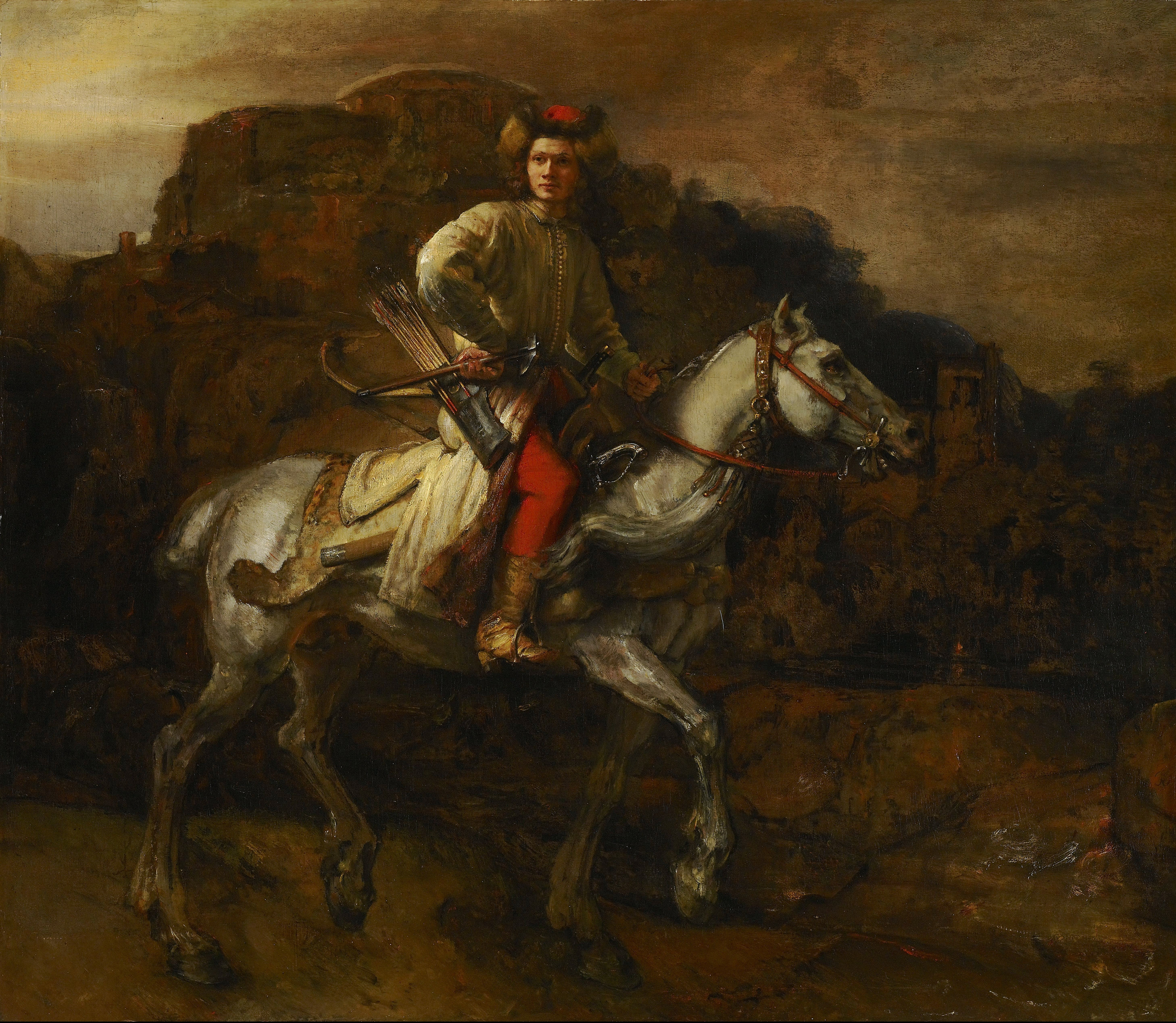
It has been proposed that Marcjan Aleksander Ogiński may be the subject of The Polish Rider (c. 1655), by Rembrandt Harmenszoon van Rijn

Marcjan Aleksander Ogiński (1632 – 5 January 1690 in Alovė, now Alytus district of Lithuania) was a Polish–Lithuanian nobleman, a military commander and a statesman of the Grand Duchy of Lithuania in the Polish–Lithuanian Commonwealth. He advanced to colonel (pulkownik) in 1657, served as Voivod of Trakai (since 1670) and Grand Chancellor of Lithuania (since 1684). He was the signatory of the Eternal Peace Treaty of 1686 with the Tsardom of Russia, on the side of the Grand Duchy of Lithuania.

Since the Oginski's birth, he was Orthodox, and participated in the religious life of the church, being a member of the Mogilev and Vilnius Church fellowships. However, in the struggle for Trakai Voivodeship demanded of him transition from Orthodoxy to Catholicism or Uniate Church, which he did in 1670 and became a commander.

He initiated the establishment of Dominicans in the Peninsula Castle of Trakai, which was approved in 1678.

Marcjan Aleksander Ogiński may be the subject of a much debated work, Rembrandt's The Polish Rider. The image was painted at the time he was studying in the Netherlands. It has been suggested that Ogiński had the portrait painted on the eve of his return to his military unit during the devastating Swedish invasions in the Deluge.
