= Artur Awejde =

Polish educator and revolutionary (1838–1863)

Government commissioner of the Augustów Voivodeship
- In office June 1863 – 25/29 August 1863
- Preceded by: Józef Piotrowski
- Succeeded by: Bronisław Radziszewski

Personal details
- Born: March 1838 Kingdom of Poland, Russian Empire (now part of Poland)
- Died: 25/29 August 1863 (aged 27) Sejny County, Kingdom of Poland, Russian Empire (now part of Poland)
- Resting place: Smolanka, Polaskie Voivodeship, Poland
- Party: Whites
- Relatives: Oskar Awejde (brother)
- Education: Saint Petersburg State University
- Occupation: Schoolteacher, civil servant

Military service
- Allegiance: Polish National Government
- Branch/service: Polish Armed Forces
- Years of service: 1863
- Battles/wars: January Uprising

Artur Awejde (Polish: [ˈar.tur aˈvɛj.dɛ]; March 1838 – 25 or 29 August 1863) was a Polish schoolteacher, civil servant, and pro-independence revolutionary in the Kingdom of Poland, which formed a part of the Russian Empire. In 1863, he participated in the January Uprising in Poland, being appointed by its leadership as the government commissioner of the Augustów Voivodeship, holding the office until his death.

== Biography ==
Artur Awejde was born in March 1838. He was a son of Edward Awejde, a lawyer from Suwałki, and had brothers Edward, Jarosław, and Oskar Awejde. He graduated from the Saint Petersburg State University (then known as the Saint Petersburg Imperial University). In 1860, he became a teacher of natural science in a primary school in Łomża.

Awejde was active in the pro-independence revolutionary movements in the Kingdom of Poland, which formed a part of the Russian Empire. He was a member of the Whites, a liberal conservative faction of the movement. Awejde participated in the preparations and organisation for the January Uprising, being appointed in 1862 by the Whites as the chief of Łomża. The uprising begun on 22 January 1863, while he was traveling form Warsaw, arriving in Łomża on 24 January. Awejde was the chief of the insurgent police, oversaw the tax collection, and recruited new insurgents. He was an aid of the government commissioner of the Augustów Voivodeship, Józef Piotrowski, and was appointed to his position in June 1863, follwoing his dismissal. During the uprising he also served in the insurgent forces, in a division under the command of Wincenty Reklecki. His brothers, Edward, Jarosław and Oskar, also participated in the January Uprising. Edward served as the chief of Suwałki, while Oskar was a member of the Provisional National Government and the Central National Committee. Jarosław served in the insurgent forces as an aide-de-camp of general Józef Hauke-Bosak.

In January 1863, Awejde was visiting a village in Sejny County, when a group of Russian soldiers begun approaching his location. He escaped to the nearby woods, where he was caught and killed by a Cossack mercenary. The sources of the date differ between 25 and 29 January 1863. He died at the age of 27. Awejde was buried in the village of Smolanka.
