= Opatówek =

- Town
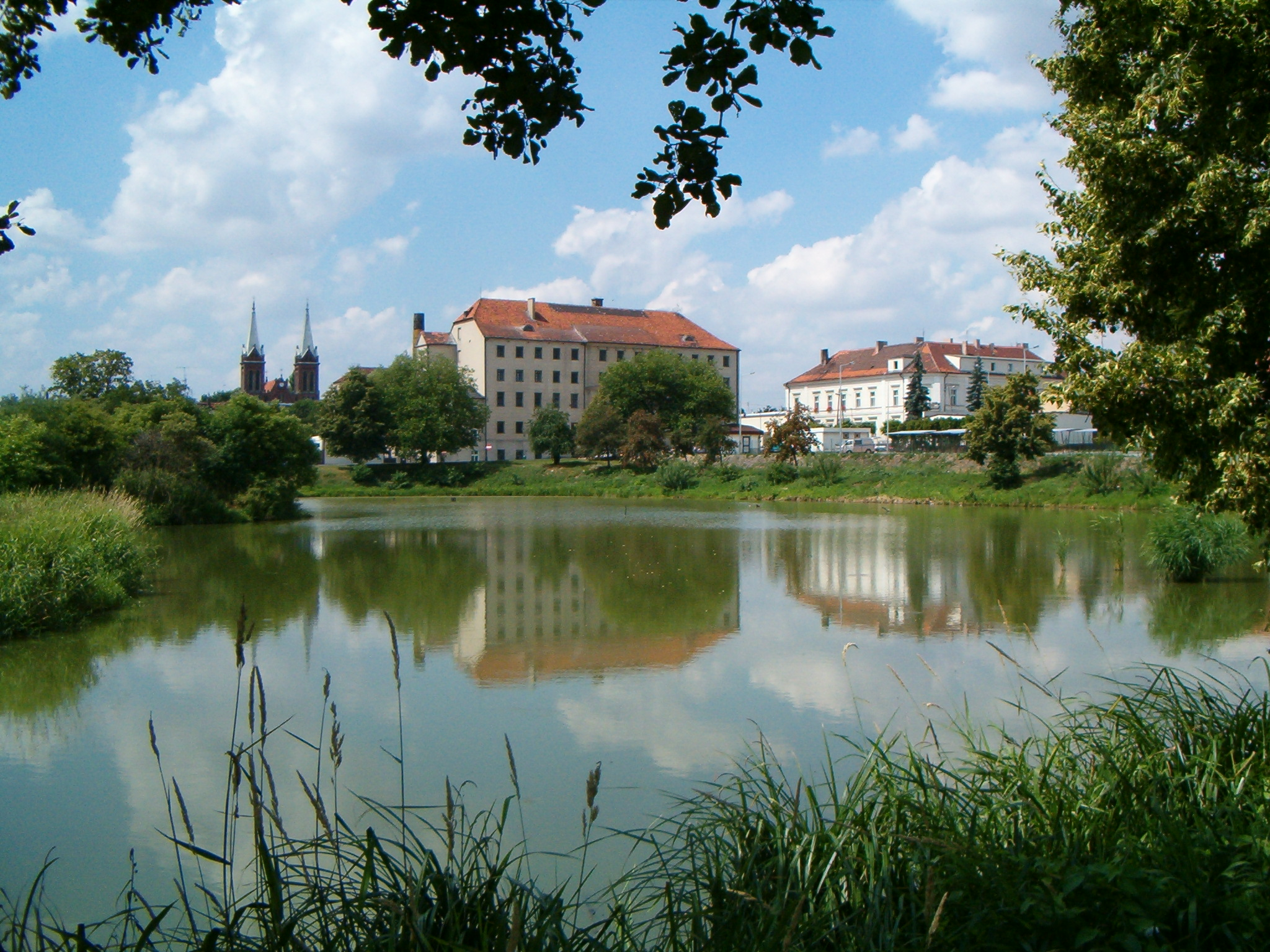
- Opatówek from the pond

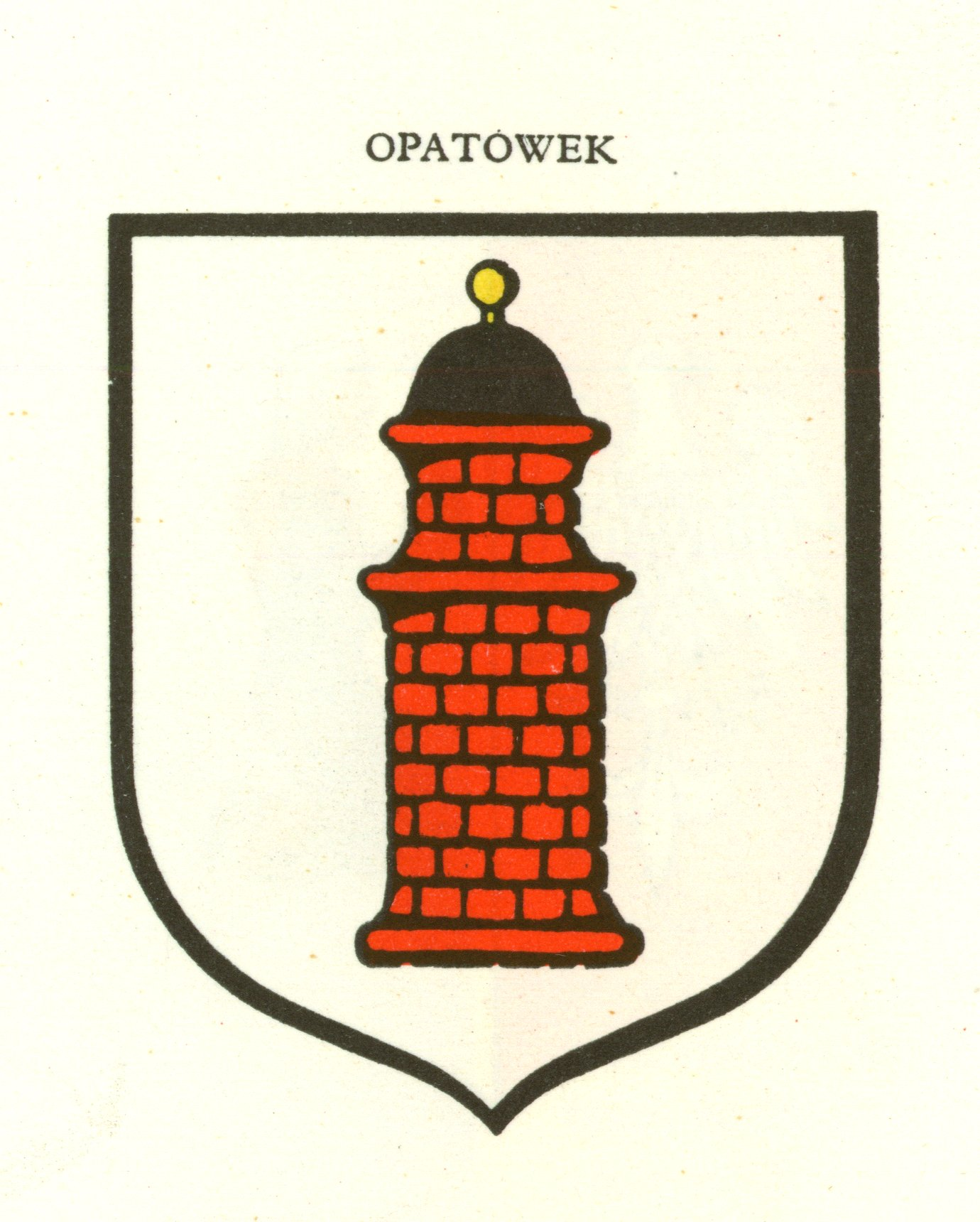
- Coat of arms

- Location within Poland
- Coordinates: 51°44′N 18°14′E
- Country: Poland
- Voivodeship: Greater Poland
- Powiat: Kalisz
- Gmina: Opatówek
- Established: before 1246
- City rights: before 1331–1870, 2017

Government
  - Mayor: Wojciech Jaskóła
- Area: 104 km^{2} (40 sq mi)
- Population (2006): 10,000
  - Urban: 3,800
- Time zone: UTC+1 (CET)
  - Summer (DST): UTC+2 (CEST)
- Postal code: 62-860
- Area code: +48 62
- Car Plates: PKA
- Website: www.opatowek.pl

Opatówek [ɔpaˈtuvɛk] is a town of 3,800 inhabitants in central Poland, situated 10 km (6.2 mi) southeast from Kalisz, in the Kalisz County in the Greater Poland Voivodeship. The commune (Gmina) of Opatówek, including the town of Opatówek and 26 other villages, has about 10,000 inhabitants and is an agricultural and industrial region. (See also Commune Opatówek.)

== Region ==
The commune is situated in a picturesque landscape of the Opatówek-Malanów Hills. The hills of Chełmce (187 m), Rajsko (177.2 m) and Tłokinia Kościelna (164.7 m) dominate the valleys of rivers Pokrzywnica, Cienia and Swędrnia. The neighbour comunes of the commune Opatówek are: Żelazków, Ceków-Kolonia and Koźminek in the north, Szczytniki in the east, Godziesze Wielkie in the south and the city of Kalisz in the west.

The architecture of Opatówek is dominated by the Neo-Gothic and classicistic style of the 19th century the most successful time of the town during the booming years of the Industrial Revolution.

== History ==
=== Early settlements ===
After early Celtic settlements the region was settled between 400 BC and 300 AD by Lugii. Kalisz was an important station of the Amber Road called Calisia.

=== Medieval and modern times ===
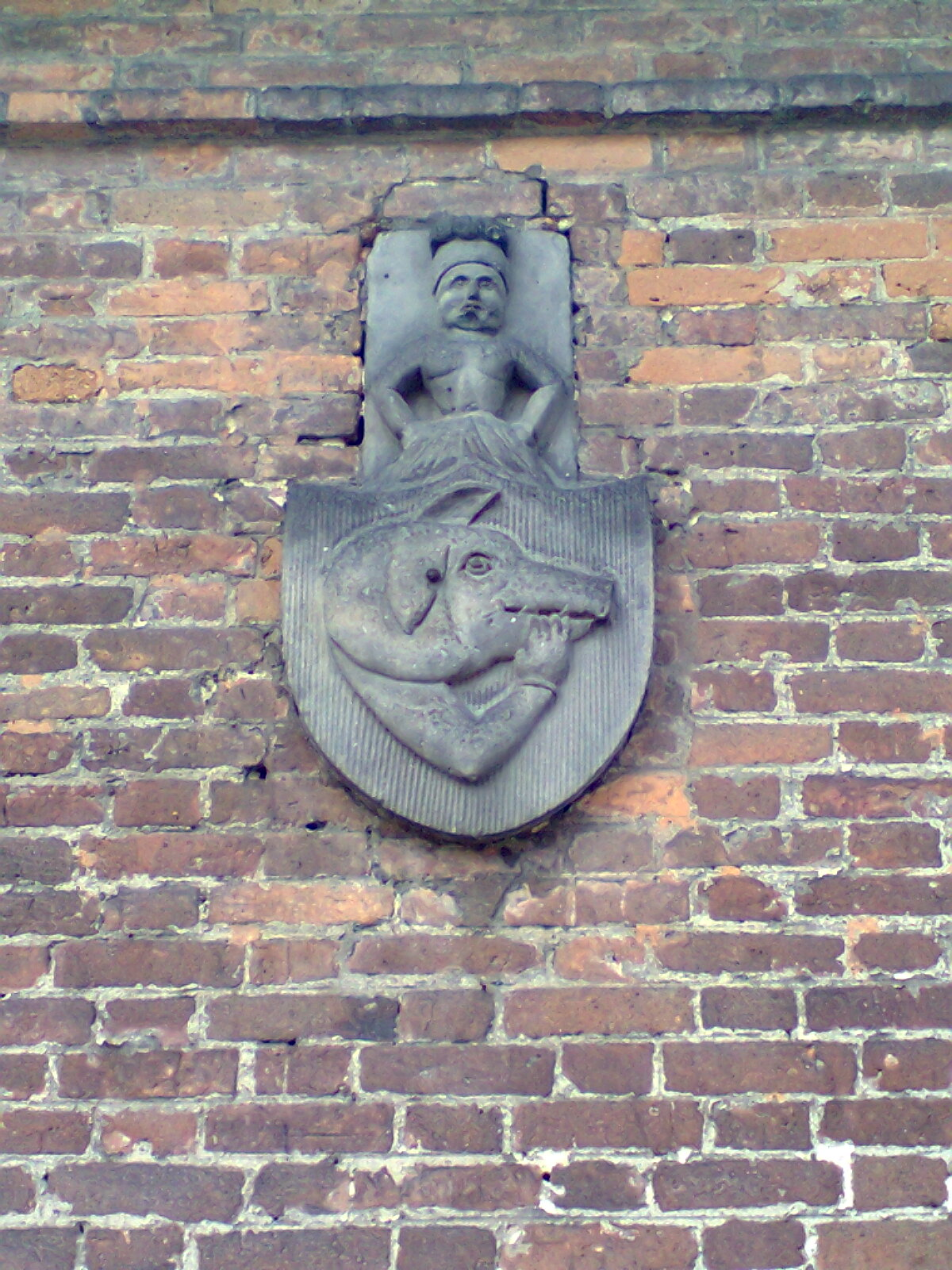
Relief of Świnka coat of arms of General Józef Zajączek

Opatówek belonged to archbishops of Gniezno since the 13th century, who probably helped it to obtain municipal rights. The archbishop Jarosław of Bogoria and Skotnik built a brick church and a castle here in about 1360, which were visited by outstanding clergymen and civil dignitaries. Both buildings stood until the beginning of the 19th century. It was a private church town, administratively located in the Kalisz County in the Kalisz Voivodeship in the Greater Poland Province of the Kingdom of Poland. From 1655 until 1660 the area was occupied by Sweden during the Deluge. In 1706 was the great battle close to Kalisz between Saxon and Swedish armies that involved 50,000 soldiers all together. The Saxon army helped by the Russian army defeated Swedish army and Polish soldiers led by Stanisław Leszczyński.

In 1793, following the Second Partition of Poland, the town was annexed by Prussia, and the archbishops' property was confiscated by the Prussian authorities. After the successful Greater Poland uprising of 1806, the town was regained by Poles and included within the short-lived Duchy of Warsaw. Since 1807 it belonged to general Józef Zajączek, the future governor of the Congress Poland. In that time many buildings designed by the most outstanding architects were constructed; moreover, the governor carried out reforms in his property which enabled the economical development in this area.

Also Napoleon's Grande Armée passed the Kalisz County at the French invasion of Russia (1812). After the Vienna Congress 1815, the area became part of so-called Congress Poland in the Russian Partition.

=== Industrial Revolution and the 19th century ===
Beginning of the 19th century the industrial revolution did not stop at Poland. Several German industrialist's started running branches cross border. Cities on both sides of the border started booming.

With the foundation of the big weaving mill by Adolf Gottlieb Fiedler, a Saxon industrialist, Opatówek started booming. Fiedler established one of the biggest weaving mills in Congress Poland in 1824–1826. The government of Congress Poland created very good conditions for the development of industry. Adolf Gottlieb Fiedler received a big loan from the Polish government to build the factory in Opatowek. Also in spite of lower salaries he followed other cloth producers to eastern regions at the time of the German Industrial Revolution. The German investments in Poland were followed by Saxon and Bohemian specialists to run the factories. There they found cheap workers, water power and they brought in their know-how. The factory of Opatówek employed 600 workers and the company won several international prizes with their products. The Opatówek factory was the cash cow of Fiedler's company. The town grew with great speed.

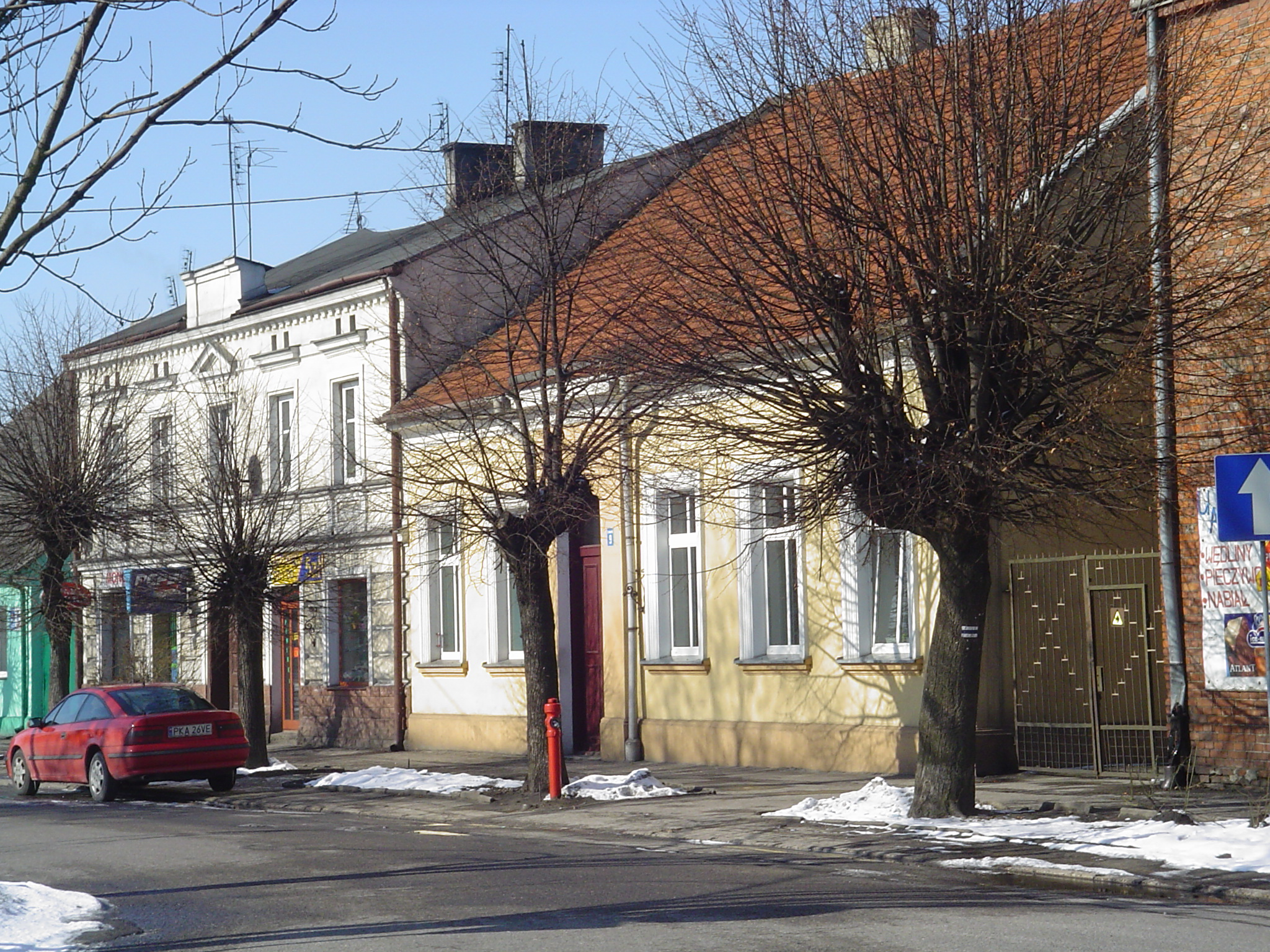
Old houses in Opatówek

During the January Uprising, on February 25, 1863, it was the site of a battle between Polish insurgents and Russian troops, which ended in a Polish victory. In 1870, Opatówek lost its municipal rights as a result of the suppression after the January Uprising and because of the economical decay. In the end of the 19th century a Wooden Toys Factory was established in Opatowek, whose products won numerous prizes at European expositions. The profit-making, well organised property yielded a big profit to the next owners.

=== The 20th century ===
At the end of 19th and the beginning of the 20th century, Opatówek was, like most cities of Greater Poland, touched by independence movements against Prussia and Russia. After World War I, in 1918, Poland regained independence and control of Opatówek.

After the joint German-Soviet invasion of Poland, which started World War II in September 1939, it was occupied by Germany until 1945. There have been several resistance movements, most of them were detected by the Gestapo.

After World War II there have been several regional changes. During the Gomułka government (1956–1970) the economy of the whole region stood still, not only because of the iron curtain. The following government, that of Edward Gierek, brought fresh wind into the region and economy grew again. Since 1990 the Third Polish Republic was founded. All Polish provinces were restructured again and Opatówek became part of Kalisz County in the restructured province Greater Poland.

=== Today ===
Nowadays there are about 800 private firms in the commune of Opatówek. They deal with production, trade or services. The Bank Spółdzielczy Ziemi Kaliskiej and a branch of the PKO Bank deal with financial service of the inhabitants, institutions and firms. In 1998 the Garden and Agriculture Fair "Pamiętajcie o ogrodach" took place in Opatówek for the first time. The local gardeners and fruit-growers, as well as exhibitors from all over the country and abroad participate in it every year. In 2001 the seventh Country-wide Youth Games for Summer Sports "Wielkopolska 2001" was inaugurated at the artificial lake in Szałe. The commune Opatówek was the host of the rowing and mountain cycling competition. The following Games for Water sports took place in summer 2004. The lake can be visited on board of the tourist ship Opatówek. The commune is represented every year by the football team "Sparta" at the regional competition. In 2006 a modern sports hall has been built where the national and international volleyball matches were held. Since 1 January 2017 Opatówek gain back their municipal rights.

== Cultural offerings ==
=== Museum ===
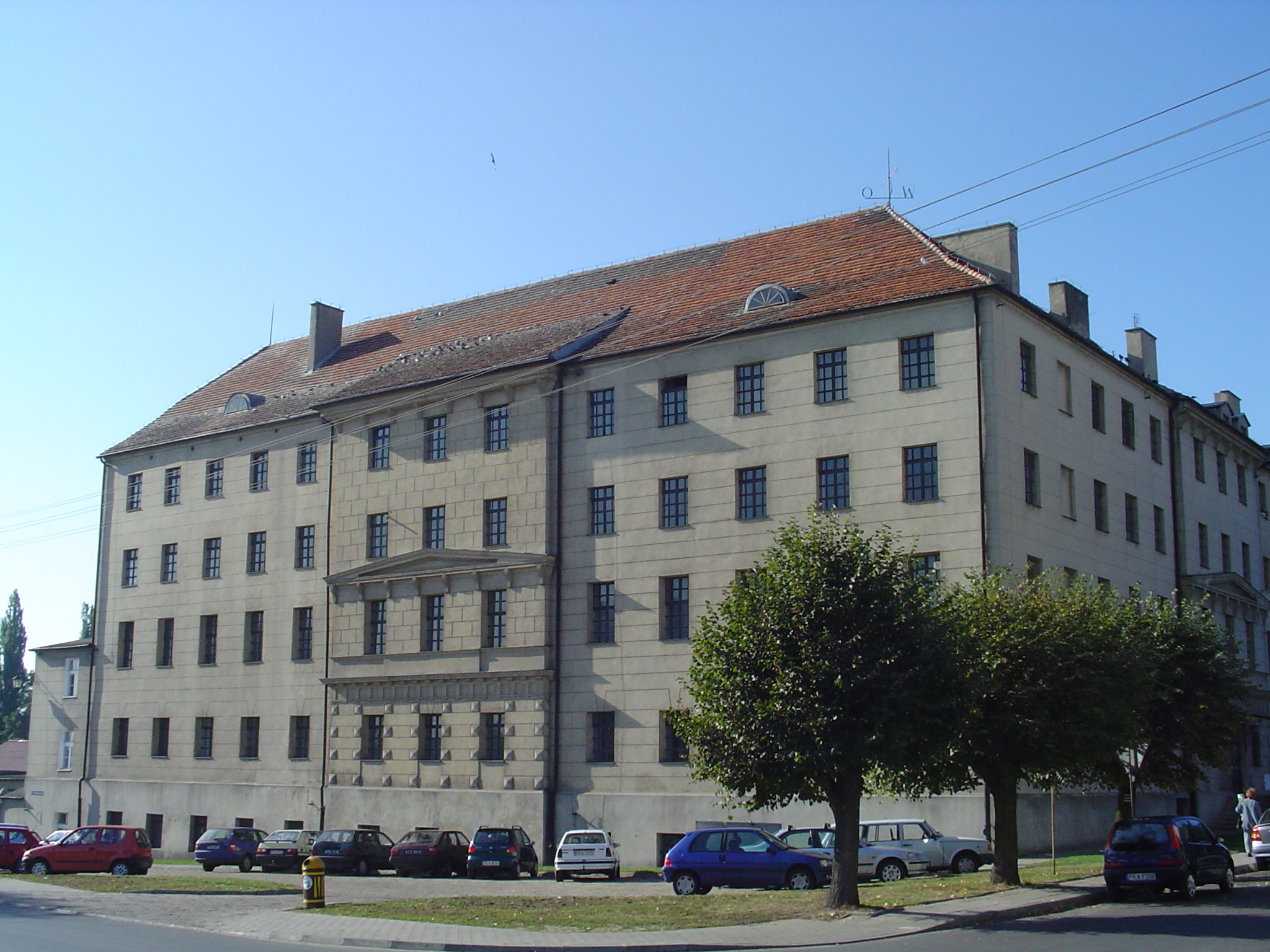
Museum, former cloth factory

The Museum of the History of Industry features a collection showing the development of industry in the Kalisz region since the beginning of the 19th century. It also contains the biggest collection of pianos and fortepianos produced on the Polish territory of Poland (in the historic building of former cloth factory). The museum was put down on the International Committee for Preservation of Industrial Heritage list. Concerts, conferences and different events (among others, the yearly musical event "Opatówecki Salon Muzyczny") take place here.

=== Monuments ===
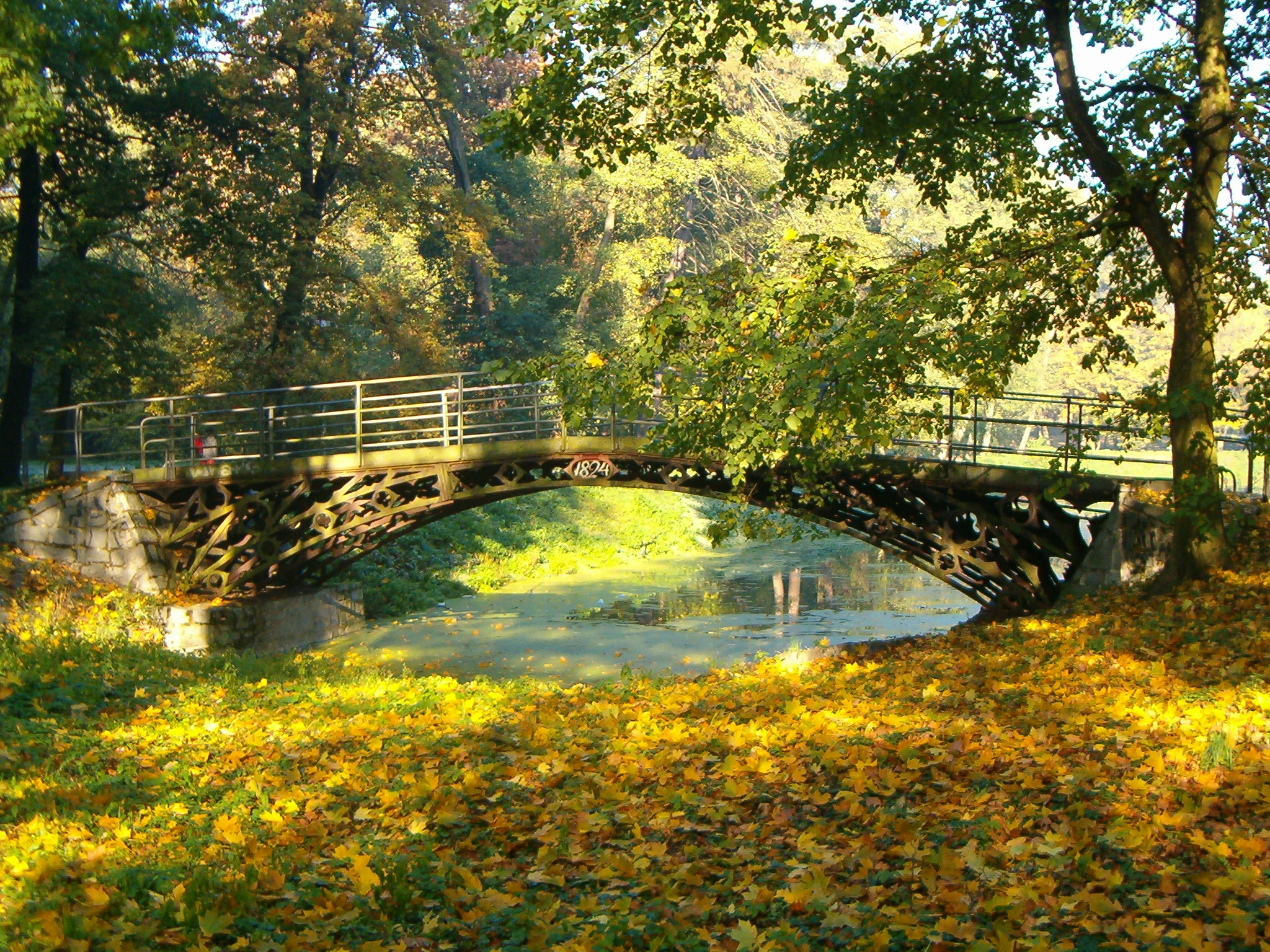
Iron Bridge in the park

- A little bridge in the park, which is the oldest existing bridge made of cast iron in the former Kingdom of Poland
- Former Adolf Gottlieb Fiedler cloth mill factory built in the style of classicism (1824), today Industry History Museum of Opatowek
- There are some monuments from the General Zajączek's times, among them the so-called "cake shop", the palace annexe, and the farm workers’ houses.

=== Churches ===
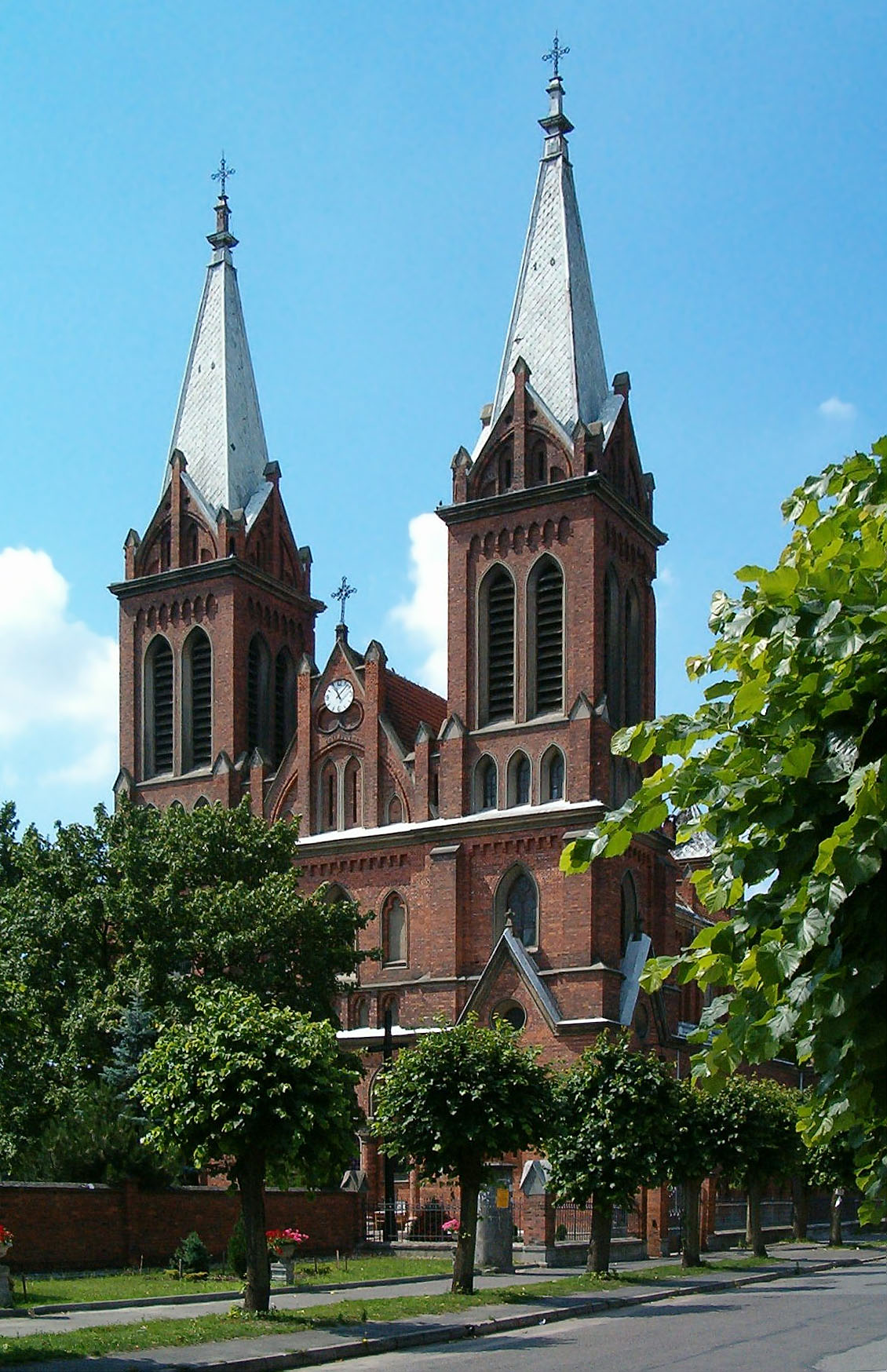
Sacred Heart church

There are 4 parish churches in the commune.

- The oldest one - the Saint Michael Archangel's church in Rajsko - was built at the beginning of the 17th century (about 1607).
- The wooden St. Jack Apostle in Tłokinia Koscielna was built in the end of the 17th century
- The Neo-Gothic of Birth of Saint God Mother in Chełmce built in 1883 at the place of former sacred buildings.
- The Neo-Gothic church of the St. Jesus' Heart in Opatówek was built in the beginning of the 20th century at the place of former sacred buildings.

=== Cultural institutions ===
- The Communal Public Library in Opatówek has also got a broad scope of activity. It has two branches in Rajsko and Tłokinia Wielka; since 1999 it has played the role of the District Library in the Kalisz District. The library with the valuable collection of books is completely computerised.
- A broad scope of activity is also executed by the communal Culture Centre in Opatówek and the Writer House (owned by NOT) in Tłokinia Kościelna.

=== General activities ===
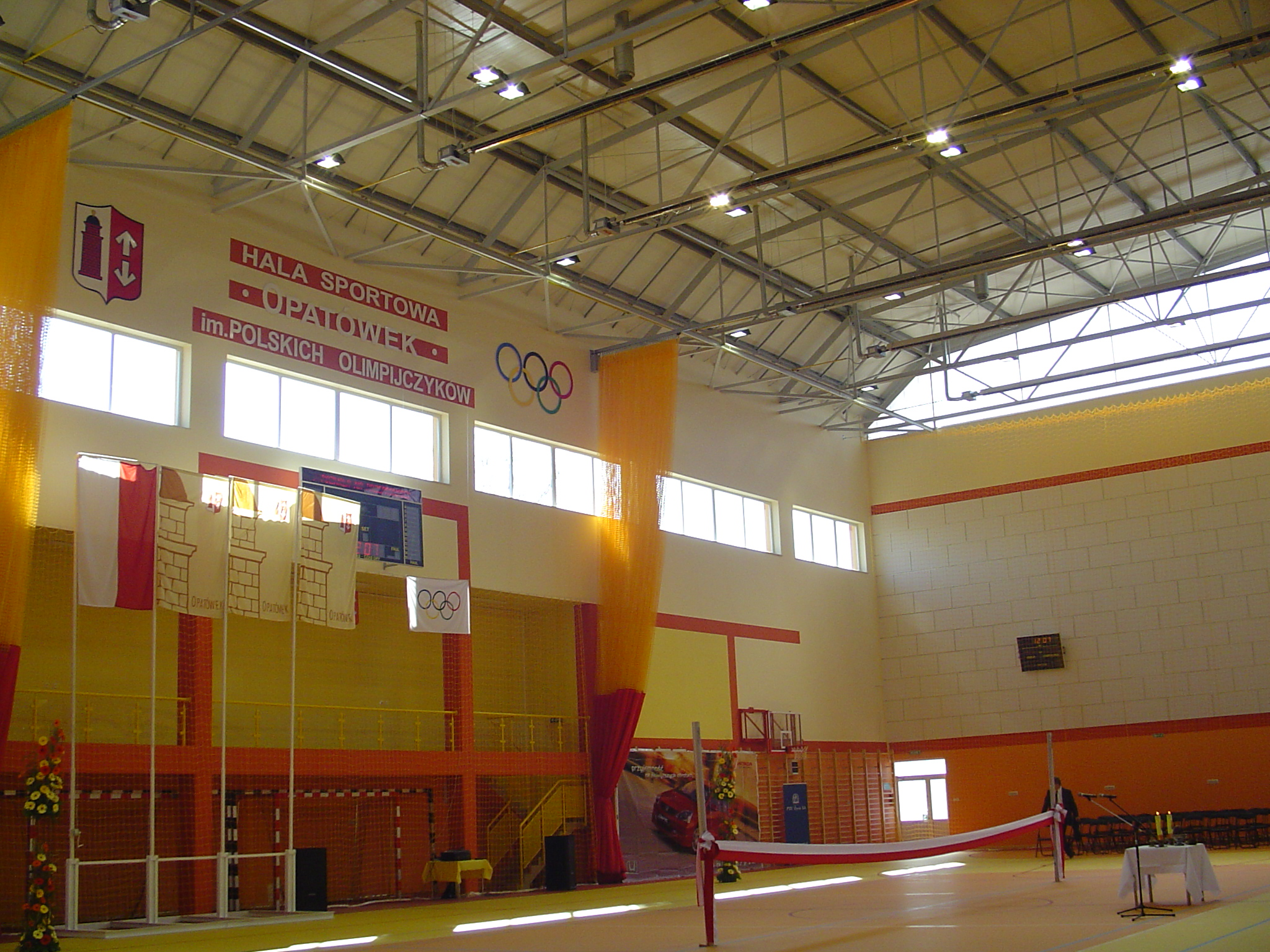
New sports hall of Opatówek

- Polish Republic Veterans and Former Political Prisoners Association,
- Pensioners and Disabled People's Association
- Polish Fishing Association
- The 16 Voluntary Fire Brigades play an important role in the commune's social life. They are represented at celebrations and concerts by their brass bands. They have long traditions; the Voluntary Fire Brigade in Opatówek celebrated its 120 anniversary in 2002.
- There are very active Farmer's Wives Circles in many villages.
- Local football club "Sparta"
- The Opatówek Lovers Association was founded in 1990 and publishes the magazine Opatowianin

=== Additional attractions ===
- A narrow gauge railway from Opatowek to Zbierk, originally built for the transport of sugar-beets to the sugar factory in Zbiersk, today tourist attraction
- A boat tour on the lake of Szałe

== Transport ==
Another advantage is its location—10 km away from Kalisz, the big urban centre and the seat of district authorities, as well as good transport connections with Kalisz and provinces' capitals: Poznań, Łódź and Wrocław. The big transcontinental east–west motorway E30 from Berlin via Poznań, Warsaw to Moscow is just 30 km north of Opatówek. Not even 100 km east, close to Łódź, there is the major east European motorway, the E75. This motorway will connect the Baltic States via Warsaw and Łódź to Prague and Athens. A cycle path runs alongside Opatówek and through the park. Tourists and travellers can find favourable conditions to take a rest in the Czarnuszka motel at the road No 12, which goes from Łęknica at the west border to Dorohusk at the Ukrainian border. Opatowek is also directly connected to Łódź and Kalisz by railway.

== Education ==
- a kindergarten
- three primary schools (six classes starting at age of seven) in Cienia Druga, Sierzchow and the Janusz Kusociński School in Opatowek
- three school groups (primary and grammar school bundled) in Chelmce, Rajsko, and Tlokinia Wielka
- a grammar school with just new school buildings in Opatowek called Gimnazjum which has received the title of "A classy school" and won The 21st century League interdisciplinary contest. At Gimnazjum you will meet qualified, creative and helpful teachers and a lot of excellent students. More information about our school you can find here: http://gimnazjum.opatowek.pl/
- Stanislaw Mikolajczyk school, a secondary school preparing for university and technical school for gardeners and farmers
- Wyższa Szkoła Informatyki - a branch of the private college of Computer Science in Łódź

== Notable people ==
- Eugeniusz Dejter (1905–1934), doctor
- Adolf Gottlieb Fiedler (1771–1850), Saxon entrepreneur in Saxony and Poland
- Agaton Giller (1831–1887), Polish patriotic activist
- Stefan Giller (1833–1918), poet, an epigone of Polish Romanticism
- Władysław Pilars de Pilar (1874–1952), a literature professor at Warsaw University, poet and entrepreneur
