= Giller =

Giller may refer to:

== People ==
- Agaton Giller (1831-1887), patriotic Polish activist
- Doris Giller, Canadian literary critic
  - Scotiabank Giller Prize, an annual Canadian English language literary award
- Edward B. Giller (1918-2017), United States Air Force general
- Stefan Giller (1833-1918), Polish Romantic poet
- Walter Giller (1927–2011), German actor

== Other uses ==
- Giller (fishing), a 19th-century term used in the Chesapeake Bay area for a gillnet fisherman
- Giller (mountain), a mountain in the Rhenish Massif, North Rhine-Westphalia and Hesse, Germany
