= Awejde =

Awejde (Polish: [aˈvɛj.dɛ]) is a surname. Notable people with the surname include:

- Artur Awejde (1838–1863), Polish schoolteacher, civil servant, and revolutionary
- Oskar Awejde (1837–1897), Polish jurist and revolutionary
