= Stefan Bobrowski =

Polish politician and activist

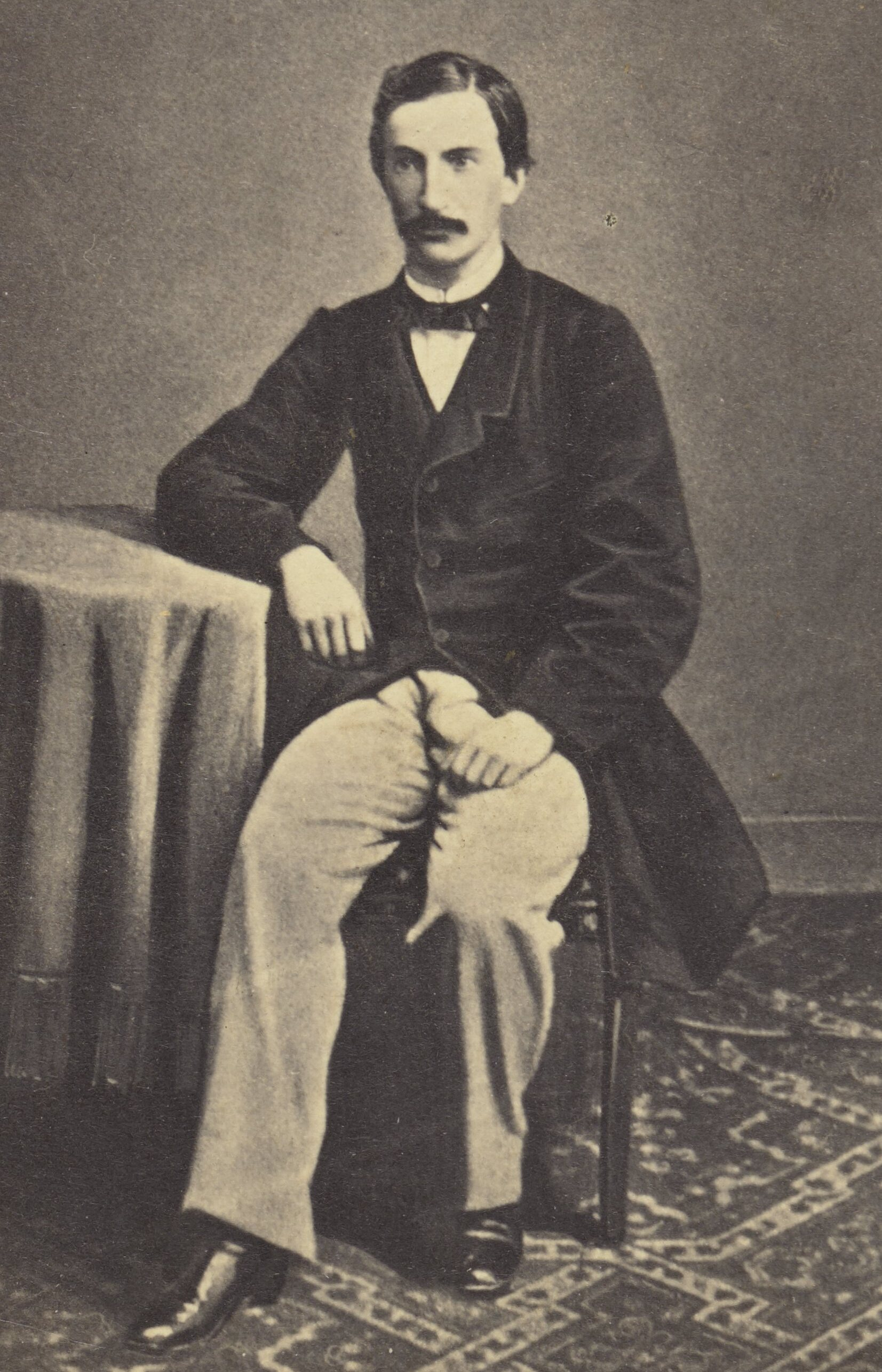
- Stefan Bobrowski in 1862
- Born: January 17, 1840 near Berdychiv, Kiev Governorate, Russian Empire
- Died: April 12, 1863 (aged 23); Kraków, Grand Duchy of Cracow
- Organization: "Reds" (Czerwoni)
- Movement: January Uprising

Stefan Bobrowski (17 January 1840 (Note: Sometimes given as 1841.) – 12 April 1863) was a Polish politician and activist for Polish independence. He participated in the January 1863 Uprising as one of the leaders of its "Red" faction and as a member of that faction's Central National Committee (Komitet Centralny Narodowy), and of the Provisional National Government (Tymczasowy Rząd Narodowy).

To rally peasants to the cause, he advocated land reform and an end to serfdom, while at the same time trying to ensure support from the szlachta (nobility). He also tried to establish links with potential revolutionaries within Russia who opposed their country's tsar.

Bobrowski died in 1863 in a pistol duel with a member of the "White" faction, Count Adam Grabowski. He had agreed to the duel though he was sure to lose due to his extreme near-sightedness.

Stefan Bobrowski was an uncle to English-language novelist Joseph Conrad, and a possible inspiration for the protagonist of Conrad's Lord Jim.

== Early life ==
Bobrowski was born to a Polish szlachta family in Terechowa near Berdyczów, which at the time was part of the Russian Empire (now in Ukraine). In 1852 he attended a gymnasium in Nemyriv and two years later in Saint Petersburg. In 1856 he began attending Saint Petersburg State University and studying Philosophy. During this time he established contacts with radical Russian and Polish students. In 1860 he abandoned his studies and moved to Kiev, where, while pretending to be a student, he engaged himself in political activism and joined the Triple Society (Związek Trojnicki); the name was a reference to the three parts of the Polish–Lithuanian Commonwealth which had been taken by Russia in the Partitions of Poland but not included in Congress Poland (Volhynia, Podolia and the Kiev area). The purpose of the society was to promote an end to serfdom without compensation to the landlords in the three areas and attracting the peasants to the cause of Polish independence. However, ultimately, Polish and Ukrainian members of the society disagreed on the question of Polish and Ukrainian statehood and language, and its founder, Volodymyr Antonovych left the organization, and was replaced on the ruling committee by Bobrowski. Bobrowski organized an illegal print shop in Kiev Pechersk Lavra and oversaw the publication of the society's two newspapers Odrodzenie (Rebirth) and Wielkorus (Great-Ruthenian). The Tsarist police found the print shop and closed it down in 1862, while Bobrowski avoided capture because the police mistakenly arrested another student with the same surname "Bobrowski" (who was shortly released). Stefan Bobrowski escaped to Romania. The authorities kept the case open until 1871, eight years after his death, when they finally closed it due to the "continued absence of the accused".

== January 1863 Uprising ==
In 1862 the Central National Committee (Komitet Centralny Narodowy, KCN) was formed in Warsaw, whose purpose was to prepare for an upcoming insurrection against Russia. Bobrowski joined it and served as its representative abroad. He traveled to Moldavia, where he checked on the formation of a Polish Legion which was supposed to enter Poland upon the outbreak of hostilities to support the insurrection. He also most likely traveled to Moscow, where he met with representatives of the secret Russian organization Zemlia i Volia, which had similar aims with regard to ending serfdom and also opposed the Tsar. He also returned to Kiev, where he subordinated the Triple Society to the KCN.

On 1 January 1863 Bobrowski came to Warsaw, where he was made a member of the Central Committee of the KCN. On 3 January he voted for the outbreak of the uprising, despite the fact that he did not believe in its success. In October 1862 the KCN had issued a statement that an insurrection was necessary in the face of a coming forced conscription into the Tsarist army, and Bobrowski with his vote was supporting the official line. The KCN also chose Ludwik Mierosławski as temporary dictator of the insurrection, despite opposition from Bobrowski.

After a lack of success on the battlefield, and personal clashes with one of the Uprising's generals, Marian Langiewicz, Mierosławski resigned his dictatorship and left Poland for Paris. At that point the Central Committee, prodded by Bobrowski, decided against the appointment of another dictator. However, on 10 March 1863 Langiewicz, influenced and misinformed by the White faction, in particular by Count Adam Grabowski, self-proclaimed as the Uprising's new dictator and took over a portion of the Committee's funds, which he used for arms purchases. Faced with such a fait accompli and wishing to avoid in-fighting among the insurrectionists, Bobrowski reluctantly affirmed and supported Langiewicz. Since Langiewicz was essentially a nominee of the "White" faction, the Red-dominated Committee insisted that as dictator he appoint advisers from its ranks and attempted to circumscribe his power to solely military matters.

Despite a successful military operation at Chroberz (notable for the charge by the Zouves of Death under the command of French-born officer François Rochebrune), after the Battle of Grochowiska Langiewicz came to believe that the cause was lost; and in late March 1863, a few weeks after having been made dictator, he crossed into Austria, where he was interned. As a result, Bobrowski and the Committee issued a manifesto announcing that the Uprising was to have no more dictators.

== Death ==
On 20 March 1863 Bobrowski went to Kraków to investigate the circumstances of Langiewicz's self-proclamation as dictator and his subsequent departure. Shortly before, he had sent a letter to Langiewicz in which he had commented upon the character of Count Grabowski, who had convinced Langiewicz to become dictator, and in which Bobrowski had referred to Grabowski as a "common thug whom a serious politician should be ashamed to even mention" ("jest to awanturnik najpospolitszy, o którym poważnemu politykowi nawet wstyd wspominać"). The letter and its contents had somehow become public knowledge. Additionally, when Bobrowski had met Grabowski face-to-face, he had refused to shake his hand. Offended, Grabowski had challenged Bobrowski to a duel.

Initially Bobrowski had turned down the challenge, since in his view an ongoing national insurrection was no time to be settling personal scores. However, the matter had been taken up by a "court of honor", which had decided in Grabowski's favor. Though Bobrowski could have simply ignored the court's decision, his sense of chivalry had dictated that he accept its verdict. He did so despite the fact that he was pretty much guaranteed to lose, as he was extremely short-sighted, while Grabowski had been a renowned marksman in the Prussian army.

The duel took place on 12 April 1863 in a forest near Rawicz, outside the village of Izbice. It is doubtful whether Bobrowski could even see his opponent. Grabowski shot him directly in the heart, and Bobrowski died on the spot.

Julian Łukaszewski, the Committee's representative in the Prussian partition, writing shortly after, called the duel an incident of "cold-blooded" and "barbaric" murder.

A memorial stone marks the site of the duel.

== Bibliography ==
- Simmons, A.; Stape, J.H. (2000). Lord Jim: Centennial Essays. Rodopi. p. 69. ISBN 9789042012240.
- Hamm, M.F. (1995). Kiev: A Portrait, 1800-1917. Princeton University Press. p. 73. ISBN 9780691025858.
- Wandycz, P.S. (1974). The Lands of Partitioned Poland, 1795-1918. University of Washington Press. p. 171. ISBN 9780295953588.
- Reddaway, W.F. (1971). The Cambridge History of Poland. Cambridge University Press. p. 377.
