= Education in Łódź =

Łódź is home to three major state-owned universities and a number of smaller schools of higher education. The biggest is the University of Łódź and for the last four years the best students in Łódź (according to the prestigious contest "Studencki Nobel") have been studying there - in 2009 the regional laureate was Piotr Pawlikowski, in 2010 - Joanna Dziuba, in 2011 and 2012 - Paweł Rogaliński.

The number of students in the higher education establishments in Łódź is still growing. They educate 113,000 students from Poland and other countries.

== Higher education ==
=== Universities ===
The universities with most students in Łódź are:

- University of Łódź (Uniwersytet Łódzki)
- Technical University of Łódź (Politechnika Łódzka)
- Medical University of Łódź (Uniwersytet Medyczny w Łodzi)
- National Film School in Łódź (Państwowa Wyższa Szkoła Filmowa, Telewizyjna i Teatralna w Łodzi)
- Academy of Fine Arts and Design (Akademia Sztuk Pięknych im. Wł. Strzemińskiego w Łodzi)

=== Other ===
Other schools of higher education, both private and church-owned, are:

- Salezjańska Wyższa Szkoła Ekonomii i Zarządzania
- Społeczna Wyższa Szkoła Przedsiębiorczości i Zarządzania (Branches in Brodnica, Ostrów Wlkp., Garwolin and Warsaw)
- Wyższa Szkoła Administracji Publicznej
- Wyższa Szkoła Edukacji Zdrowotnej
- Wyższa Szkoła Finansów i Informatyki im. prof. J. Chechlińskiego (Branch in Kalisz)
- Wyższa Szkoła Humanistyczno-Ekonomiczna (Branches in Konin and Bydgoszcz)
- Wyższa Szkoła Informatyki (Branches in Bydgoszcz, Włocławek and Opatówek)
- Wyższa Szkoła Kupiecka (Branches in Piotrków Tryb., Sieradz, Konin and Szczecinek)
- Wyższa Szkoła Marketingu i Biznesu
- Wyższa Szkoła Pedagogiczna
- Wyższa Szkoła COSINUS
- Wyższa Szkoła Kupiecka
- Wyższa Szkoła Sportowa im. Kazimierza Górskiego
- Wyższa Szkoła Teologiczno-Humanistyczna
- Wyższa Szkoła Sztuki i Projektowania
- Wyższa Szkoła Turystyki i Hotelarstwa
- Wyższa Szkoła Zawodowa Łódzkiej Korporacji Oświatowej
