= Janików =

Janików may refer to the following places in Poland:

- Janików, Lower Silesian Voivodeship (south-west Poland)
- Janików, Świętokrzyskie Voivodeship (south-central Poland)
- Janików, Kozienice County in Masovian Voivodeship (east-central Poland)
- Janików, Przysucha County in Masovian Voivodeship (east-central Poland)
- Janików, Greater Poland Voivodeship (west-central Poland)
- Janików, Lubusz Voivodeship (west Poland)
