= Garczyński =

Garczyński can refer to:

- Garczynski Nunatak, a nunatak in the Wisconsin Range
- Stefan Florian Garczyński, a Polish Romantic poet and messianist
- Stefan Garczyński (1690–1756), voivode of Poznań
