= Reds (January Uprising) =

Insurrectionists during the January Uprising

- Czerwoni
- Dates active: 1861–1864
- Country: Congress Poland
- Allegiance: Polish National Government

The Reds (Polish: Czerwoni) were a faction of the Polish insurrectionists during the January Uprising in 1863. They were radical democratic activists who supported the outbreak of the uprising from the outset, advocated an end to serfdom in Congress Poland and future independent Poland, without compensation to the landlords, land reform and other substantial social reforms. This contrasted them with the White faction, which only came to support the Uprising after it was already under way, and which, while also strongly supporting an end to serfdom, wanted to compensate the landowners.

In general, the Reds represented liberal intellectuals while the Whites based their support on progressive landlords. The Reds were based in Warsaw and concentrated around the Medico-Chirurgical Academy, while the Whites' base of support was in Kraków. The Central National Committee (Komitet Centralny Narodowy) formed the leadership basis of the faction.

== Notable members ==
- Oskar Awejde
- Stefan Bobrowski
- Jarosław Dąbrowski
- Apollo Korzeniowski
- Agaton Giller
- Ludwik Mierosławski
- Zygmunt Padlewski
- Bronisław Szwarce
