= Kuźnica =

Kuźnica is a Polish toponym meaning Hammer mill, it may refer to:

- Kuźnica, Pomeranian Voivodeship (north Poland), a district of the seaside town of Jastarnia

- Kuźnica railway station

- Kuźnica, Kuyavian-Pomeranian Voivodeship (north-central Poland)
- Kuźnica, Podlaskie Voivodeship (north-east Poland)
- Kuźnica, Gmina Rusiec in Łódź Voivodeship (central Poland)
- Kuźnica, Gmina Zelów in Łódź Voivodeship (central Poland)
- Kuźnica, Gmina Nowa Brzeźnica in Łódź Voivodeship (central Poland)
- Kuźnica, Gmina Sulmierzyce in Łódź Voivodeship (central Poland)
- Kuźnica, Radomsko County in Łódź Voivodeship (central Poland)
- Kuźnica, Wieluń County in Łódź Voivodeship (central Poland)
- Kuźnica, Masovian Voivodeship (east-central Poland)
- Kuźnica, Greater Poland Voivodeship (west-central Poland)
- Kuźnica, Silesian Voivodeship (south Poland)
- Kuźnica, Opole Voivodeship (south-west Poland)

== See also ==
- Stara Kuźnica (disambiguation)
