= Emilia Heurich =

Polish revolutionary (1819–1905)

Emilia Heurich (16 August 1819 – 8 September 1905) was a wealthy Polish revolutionary and an active participant of the 1863 January Uprising. She was the keeper of the documents and seals of the Polish National Government and publisher of its newspaper. She was arrested, questioned and exiled to Russia for her activities.

== Biography ==
She was born on 16 August 1819 in Warsaw to the goldsmith Jan Maciej and his wife Anna Regina née Gudatz Szwarc (also spelled Szwarce or Schwartz). They were a wealthy Polonized Lutheran family of German origin. Emilia had four older brothers: Józef Jan (born 1805), Feliks Jan (1807–1838), Konstanty Edward (1817–1853) and Jan Maciej Hipolit (1811–1884).

Emilia married her brother-in-law's younger brother, Jan Daniel Heurich. They had four daughters: Emilia (1841–1899), Julia (1842–1873), Teodora Anna (1844–1920) and Helena (1851–1918). After Jan's death, the family lived on Widok Street with their mother, grandmother and maid.

As young girls, Emilia's older daughters worked at Karol Beyer's photography studio as retouchers. Several dozen photographs taken there have survived. The girls were hired at the request of Jan Maciej Hipolit Szwarce, Emilia's brother, who was the studio's manager. This allowed the Heurichównas to contribute to the family budget, even after they were forced to discontinue their tutoring work because of the family's clandestine activities.

In the pre-uprising period, Emilia supported the Red Camp. The Polish underground movement met in Emilia Heurich's house at 1575 Widok Street (later No. 5), which became "one of the centers of the Warsaw underground." The house was also frequented by Emilia's activist nephew, Bronisław Szwarc, who invited the elite of the patriotic intelligentsia to meet there, including the Central National Committee, of which he was a member. The illegal magazine called "Ruch" (“Movement”) was printed in the Heurich house, which also had a clandestine photography studio operated by Emilia and her daughters. The women were all involved in helping the insurgents: they sewed clothes, cooked meals, organized collections of money and materials for prisoners and exiles, and helped friends escape beyond the borders of the Russian partition. Emilia Heurich also belonged to a clandestine women's organization.

Emilia secretly guarded the documents and seals of the Polish National Government (January Uprising). When she was arrested and imprisoned in the Warsaw Citadel on Christmas Eve 1862 and later exiled to Vyatka (now Kirov), her daughters quickly burned dangerous evidence, including stacks of copies of the Ruch magazine that had been overlooked by the arresting soldiers.

In their mother's absence, the daughters continued to be active in the independence movement. They provided support to the leaders of the uprising, acted as couriers, and collected food and clothing for prisoners in the Citadel and those exiled for participating in the underground resistance. They were present at the deaths of loved ones sentenced to death: they performed their "last duties" for Józef Piotrowski and Jan Jeziorański. The two older Heurichówna sisters shared their mother's fate: repeatedly interrogated in Pawiak, imprisoned in the Warsaw Citadel and finally exiled to Vyatka. Their sentence was commuted to two years in Preny, where they were sent in 1866.

Using information from her daughters, Emilia managed to escape her prison. She hid in the Prussian partition and remained there until 1872. After returning to Warsaw, she opened a fabric shop.

Emilia Heurich died on 8 September 1905 in Warsaw and was buried there at the Evangelical-Augsburg Cemetery.

== Memoir ==
In 1918, German military censorship permitted the printing of Memoirs of a Mother and Daughter from the 1863 Uprising. The text is an interwoven account of Emilia Heurich and her daughter Teodora Kiślańska, describing the January Uprising and the following years. In the text, Emilia looks back on the November Uprising and post-uprising emigration (her brothers left the country), and even earlier events, which she recalls based on her mother's stories, such as the Prague Massacre. The memoir was written at Emilia's initiative. The authors aimed to honor the memory of their loved ones, including sisters and cousins who had died while participating in the independence movement. In 2023, an expanded version of Memoirs of a Mother and Daughter from the 1863 Uprising was published, compiled by Lidia Michalska-Bracha and Emil Noiński based on a previously unknown manuscript from the Central State Historical Archive of Ukraine in Lviv.

== Commemoration ==
The Luteraneum Studio at the Evangelical-Augsburg Parish of the Holy Trinity in Warsaw transformed the Memoirs of a Mother and Daughter from the 1863 Uprising into an audiobook available online. In 2013, the State Archives in Warsaw prepared an exhibition entitled "And We – Back Then – Couldn't Be Different". Selected images of the everyday life of a Warsaw family during the January Uprising. The memoirs of Emilia Heurich and her daughter Teodora Kiślańska formed the basis for the exhibit.
