= Nędzerzew, Greater Poland Voivodeship =

Nędzerzew
- Village
- Location within Poland
- Coordinates: 51°46′N 18°8′E
- Country: Poland
- Voivodeship: Greater Poland
- County: Kalisz
- Gmina: Opatówek

Nędzerzew [nɛnˈd͡zɛʐɛf] is a village in the administrative district of Gmina Opatówek, within Kalisz County, Greater Poland Voivodeship, in west-central Poland.
