= Cienia-Folwark =

- Village
- Location within Poland
- Coordinates: 51°43′31″N 18°14′18″E
- Country: Poland
- Voivodeship: Greater Poland
- County: Kalisz
- Gmina: Opatówek
- Population: 64

Cienia-Folwark [ˈt͡ɕɛɲa ˈfɔlvark] is a village in the administrative district of Gmina Opatówek, within Kalisz County, Greater Poland Voivodeship, in west-central Poland.
