= Kamień, Kalisz County =

Kamień
- Village
- Location within Poland
- Coordinates: 51°50′N 18°14′E
- Country: Poland
- Voivodeship: Greater Poland
- County: Kalisz
- Gmina: Ceków-Kolonia
- Population: 1,100

Kamień (Polish pronunciation: [ˈkamjɛj̃]) is a village in the administrative district of Gmina Ceków-Kolonia, within Kalisz County, Greater Poland Voivodeship, in west-central Poland.
