= Gmina Ceków-Kolonia =

Gmina Ceków-Kolonia Ceków-Kolonia Commune
- Gmina
- Coat of arms

- Coordinates (Ceków-Kolonia): 51°53′N 18°18′E
- Country: Poland
- Voivodeship: Greater Poland
- County: Kalisz County
- Seat: Ceków-Kolonia

Area
  - Total: 88.19 km^{2} (34.05 sq mi)

Population (2006)
  - Total: 4,529
  - Density: 51.36/km^{2} (133.0/sq mi)
- Website: http://www.cekow.pl

Gmina Ceków-Kolonia is a rural gmina (administrative district) in Kalisz County, Greater Poland Voivodeship, in west-central Poland. Its seat is the village of Ceków-Kolonia, which lies approximately 21 kilometres (13 mi) north-east of Kalisz and 111 km (69 mi) south-east of the regional capital Poznań.

The gmina covers an area of 88.19 square kilometres (34.1 sq mi), and had a total population of 4,529 as of 2006.

== Villages ==
Gmina Ceków-Kolonia contains the villages and settlements of Beznatka, Bielawy, Bystrek, Ceków, Ceków-Kolonia, Cierpiatka, Gostynie, Huta, Kamień, Kamień-Kolonia, Korek, Kosmów, Kosmów-Kolonia, Kuźnica, Magdalenów, Morawin, Nowa Plewnia, Nowe Prażuchy, Odpadki, Olendry, Orli Staw, Orzeł, Plewnia, Podzborów, Przedzeń, Przespolew Kościelny, Przespolew Pański, Radzany, Stare Prażuchy, Świdle, Szadek and Szadykierz.

== Neighbouring gminas ==
Gmina Ceków-Kolonia is bordered by the gminas of Kawęczyn, Koźminek, Lisków, Malanów, Mycielin, Opatówek and Żelazków.
