= Odpadki =

- Village
- Location within Poland
- Coordinates: 51°53′40″N 18°21′47″E
- Country: Poland
- Voivodeship: Greater Poland
- County: Kalisz
- Gmina: Ceków-Kolonia

Odpadki [ɔtˈpatki] is a village in the administrative district of Gmina Ceków-Kolonia, within Kalisz County, Greater Poland Voivodeship, in west-central Poland.
