= Zawady, Kalisz County =

Zawady
- Village
- Location within Poland
- Coordinates: 51°43′57″N 18°10′12″E
- Country: Poland
- Voivodeship: Greater Poland
- County: Kalisz
- Gmina: Opatówek

Zawady [zaˈvadɨ] is a village in the administrative district of Gmina Opatówek, within Kalisz County, Greater Poland Voivodeship, in west-central Poland.
