= Gostynie =

- Village
- Location within Poland
- Coordinates: 51°55′N 18°17′E
- Country: Poland
- Voivodeship: Greater Poland
- County: Kalisz
- Gmina: Ceków-Kolonia

Gostynie [ɡɔsˈtɨɲɛ] is a village in the administrative district of Gmina Ceków-Kolonia, within Kalisz County, Greater Poland Voivodeship, in west-central Poland.
