= Beznatka =

- Settlement
- Location within Poland
- Coordinates: 50°49′N 18°12′E
- Country: Poland
- Voivodeship: Greater Poland
- County: Kalisz
- Gmina: Ceków-Kolonia

Beznatka [bɛzˈnatka] is a settlement in the administrative district of Gmina Ceków-Kolonia, within Kalisz County, Greater Poland Voivodeship, in west-central Poland.
