= Orzeł, Greater Poland Voivodeship =

Orzeł
- Settlement
- Location within Poland
- Coordinates: 51°48′11″N 18°14′38″E
- Country: Poland
- Voivodeship: Greater Poland
- County: Kalisz
- Gmina: Ceków-Kolonia

Orzeł [ˈɔʐɛu̯] is a settlement in the administrative district of Gmina Ceków-Kolonia, within Kalisz County, Greater Poland Voivodeship, in west-central Poland.
