= Cierpiatka =

- Settlement
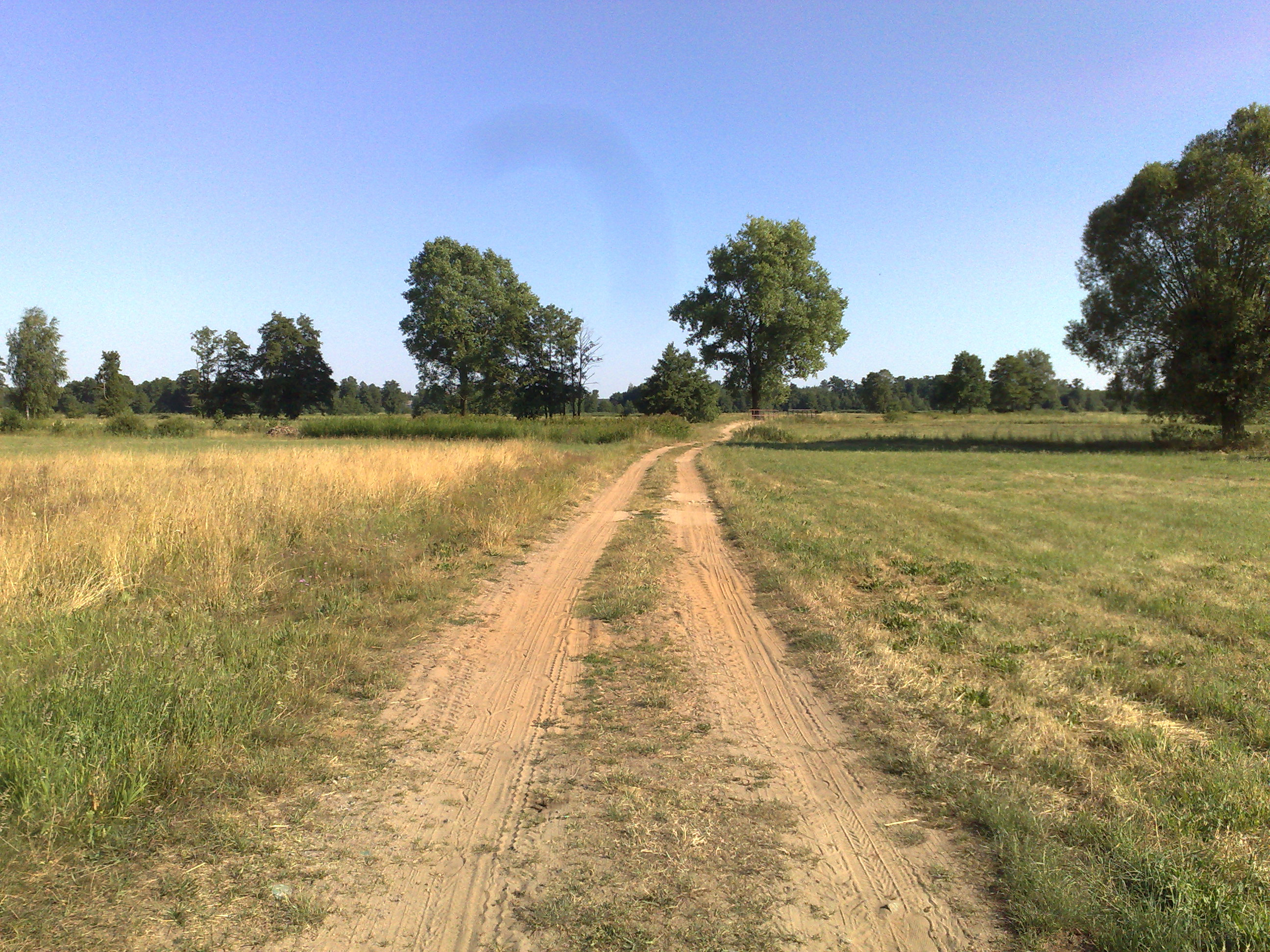
- An unpaved road in Cierpiatka

- Location within Poland
- Coordinates: 51°48′58″N 18°15′21″E
- Country: Poland
- Voivodeship: Greater Poland
- County: Kalisz
- Gmina: Ceków-Kolonia

Cierpiatka [t͡ɕɛrˈpjatka] is a settlement in the administrative district of Gmina Ceków-Kolonia, within Kalisz County, Greater Poland Voivodeship, in west-central Poland.
