= Tłokinia Mała =

- Village
- Location within Poland
- Coordinates: 51°46′N 18°11′E
- Country: Poland
- Voivodeship: Greater Poland
- County: Kalisz
- Gmina: Opatówek
- Population: 16
- Website: http://www.tlokinia.rox.pl

Tłokinia Mała [twɔˈkiɲa ˈmawa] is a village in the administrative district of Gmina Opatówek, within Kalisz County, Greater Poland Voivodeship, in west-central Poland.
