= Porwity =

- Village
- Location within Poland
- Coordinates: 51°42′N 18°13′E
- Country: Poland
- Voivodeship: Greater Poland
- County: Kalisz
- Gmina: Opatówek

Porwity [pɔrˈvitɨ] is a village in the administrative district of Gmina Opatówek, within Kalisz County, Greater Poland Voivodeship, in west-central Poland.
