= Sierzchów, Greater Poland Voivodeship =

Sierzchów
- Village
- Location within Poland
- Coordinates: 51°46′N 18°17′E
- Country: Poland
- Voivodeship: Greater Poland
- County: Kalisz
- Gmina: Opatówek

Sierzchów [ˈɕɛʂxuf] is a village in the administrative district of Gmina Opatówek, within Kalisz County, Greater Poland Voivodeship, in west-central Poland. According to data from April 21, 2004, the village had 473 inhabitants.

== History ==
From 1975 to 1998, the locality was situated in the Kalisz Voivodeship.
