= Huta, Kalisz County =

Huta
- Settlement
- Location within Poland
- Coordinates: 51°53′52″N 18°23′47″E
- Country: Poland
- Voivodeship: Greater Poland
- County: Kalisz
- Gmina: Ceków-Kolonia

Huta [ˈxuta] is a settlement in the administrative district of Gmina Ceków-Kolonia, within Kalisz County, Greater Poland Voivodeship, in west-central Poland.
