= Stefan Florian Garczyński =

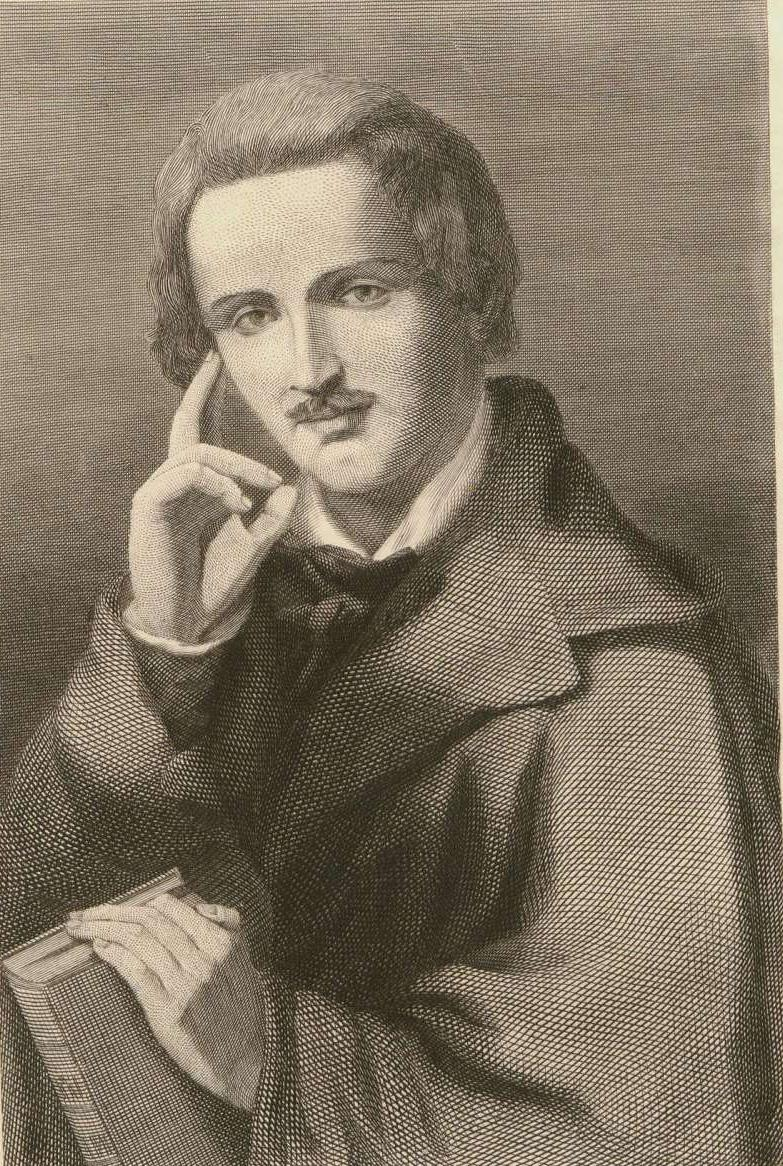
- Born: 13 October 1805; Kosmów, Greater Poland Voivodeship
- Died: 20 September 1833 (aged 27); Paris
- Occupation: poet
- Writing career
- Literary movement: Romanticism

Stefan Florian Garczyński (13 October 1805 or 1806 – 20 September 1833) was a Polish Romantic poet and messianist.

During November Uprising he served in Poznań's Riding Regiment. His report about explosion in Fort 54 during storm of Warsaw by Russian Army on 6 September 1831 inspired Adam Mickiewicz to write a poem Reduta Ordona (opowiadanie adiutanta) (Ordon's Redoubt - the story of an adjutant) (1832).
