= Cienia Trzecia =

- Village
- Location within Poland
- Coordinates: 51°43′N 18°12′E
- Country: Poland
- Voivodeship: Greater Poland
- County: Kalisz
- Gmina: Opatówek

Cienia Trzecia [ˈt͡ɕɛɲa ˈtʂɛt͡ɕa] is a village in the administrative district of Gmina Opatówek, within Kalisz County, Greater Poland Voivodeship, in west-central Poland.
