= Zduny, Kalisz County =

Zduny
- Village
- Location within Poland
- Coordinates: 51°44′36″N 18°9′53″E
- Country: Poland
- Voivodeship: Greater Poland
- County: Kalisz
- Gmina: Opatówek

Zduny [ˈzdunɨ] is a village in the administrative district of Gmina Opatówek, within Kalisz County, Greater Poland Voivodeship, in west-central Poland.
