= Bogumiłów, Greater Poland Voivodeship =

Bogumiłów
- Village
- Location within Poland
- Coordinates: 51°42′43″N 18°11′56″E
- Country: Poland
- Voivodeship: Greater Poland
- County: Kalisz
- Gmina: Opatówek

Bogumiłów [bɔɡuˈmiwuf] is a village in the administrative district of Gmina Opatówek, within Kalisz County, Greater Poland Voivodeship, in west-central Poland.
