= Szulec =

- Village
- Location within Poland
- Coordinates: 51°45′N 18°15′E
- Country: Poland
- Voivodeship: Greater Poland
- County: Kalisz
- Gmina: Opatówek

Szulec [ˈʂulɛt͡s] is a village in the administrative district of Gmina Opatówek, within Kalisz County, Greater Poland Voivodeship, in west-central Poland.
