= Chełmce, Greater Poland Voivodeship =

Chełmce
- Village
- Location within Poland
- Coordinates: 51°41′58″N 18°10′15″E
- Country: Poland
- Voivodeship: Greater Poland
- County: Kalisz
- Gmina: Opatówek
- Elevation: 173 m (568 ft)

Chełmce [ˈxɛu̯mt͡sɛ] is a village in the administrative district of Gmina Opatówek, within Kalisz County, Greater Poland Voivodeship, in west-central Poland.
