= Oskar Awejde =

Polish jurist

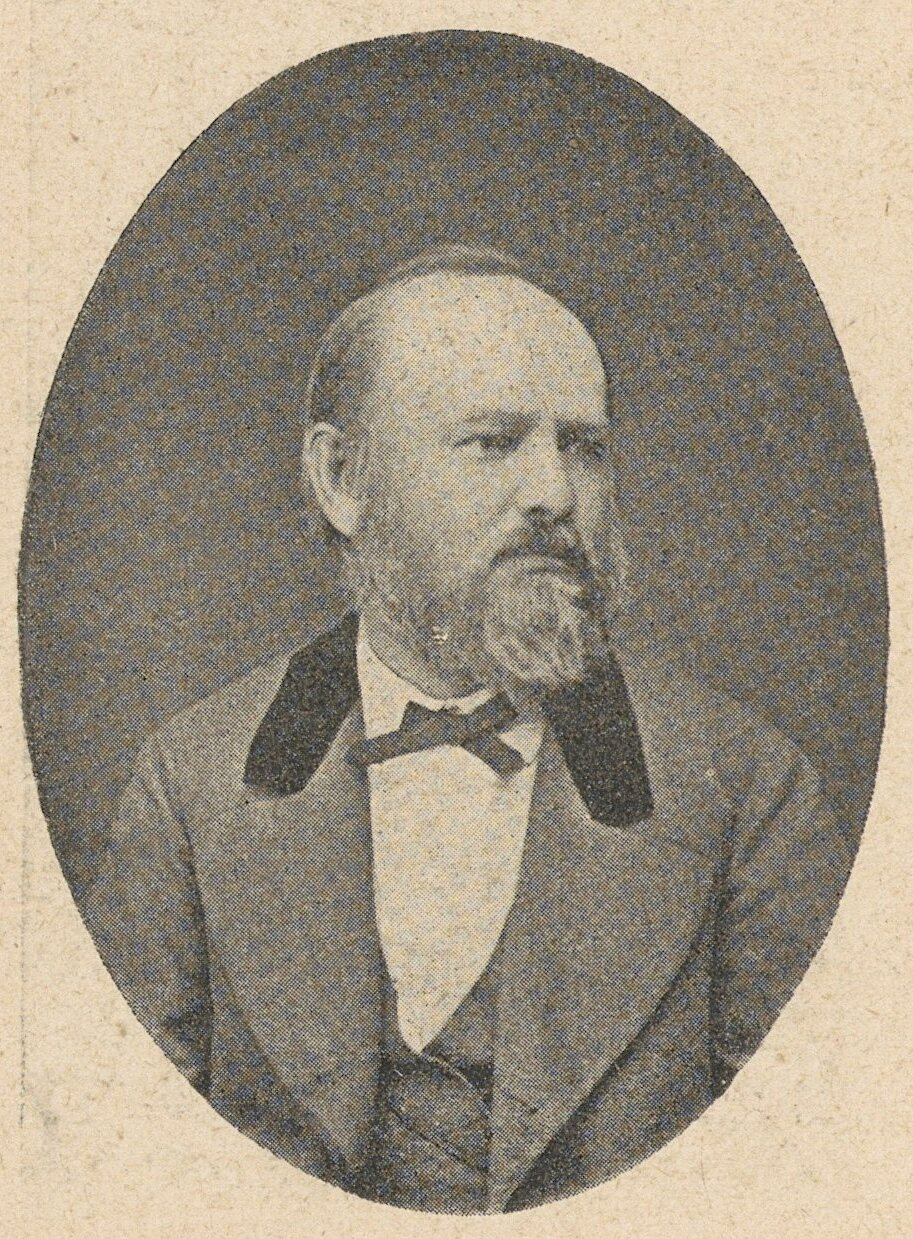
- Portrait of Awejde from a book by Karol Rzepecki. From the collections of the National Library of Poland
- Born: 1837; Mariampol, Augustów Governorate, Congress Poland
- Died: August 20, 1897 (aged 59–60); Vyatka, Vyatka Governorate, Russian Empire
- Education: Saint Petersburg Imperial University
- Era: 19th century
- Organization: Central National Committee
- Political party: Reds
- Relatives: Artur Awejde (brother); Maria Awejde (daughter)

Oskar Awejde (1837–1897) was a Polish jurist. He was a member of the Red faction during the January uprising.
