= Zygmunt Padlewski =

Polish insurgent

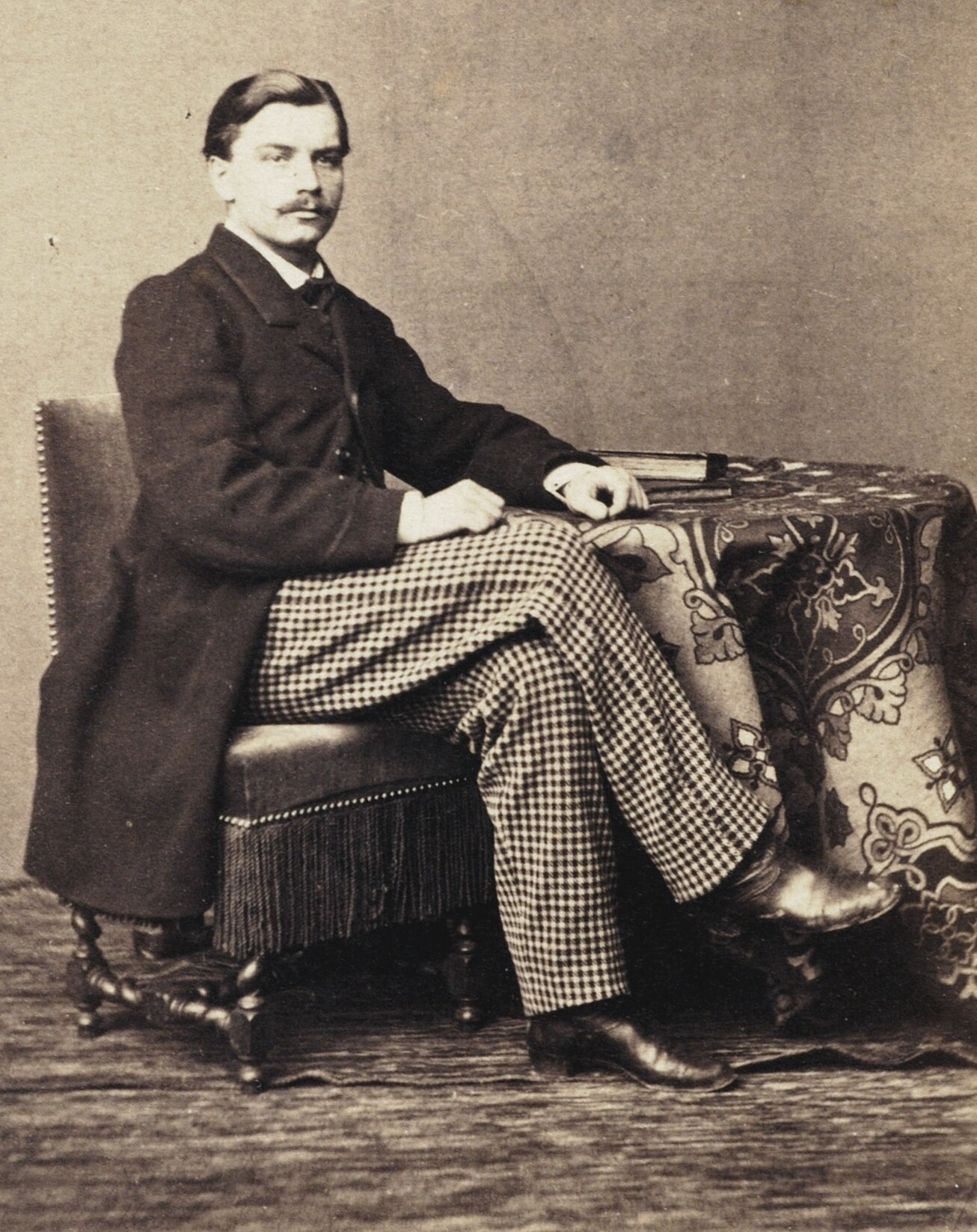
- Padlewski in 1861
- Born: January 1, 1836; Czerniawka Mała, Berdichevsky Uyezd, Kiev Governorate, Russian Empire
- Died: May 15, 1863 (aged 27); Płock, Congress Poland, Russian Empire
- Occupations: Polish general and politician

Zygmunt Padlewski (1836–1863) was a Polish insurgent who participated in the January Uprising. He was one of the leaders of the "Red" faction among the insurrectionists as a member of the Central National Committee (Komitet Centralny Narodowy) and the Provisional National Government (Tymczasowy Rząd Narodowy).

== Early years ==
Padlewski was born in a mansion in Czerniawka Mała, in the Kiev Governorate of the Russian Empire (now Ukraine) on January 1, 1836. His father, Władysław, took part in the November Uprising. His parents assured that he had a good education and, as a youth, he learned to speak Polish, Ukrainian, Russian, and French. His formal education consisted of military training at the Corps of Cadets in Brest on the Bug River and at the Konstantynowskim Corps of Cadets in St. Petersburg, Russia. In St. Petersburg he was a member of the underground Polish officer organization, led by general Zygmunt Sierakowski. He was quickly promoted to lieutenant after service with the horse guards at Novgorod.

== Planning an insurgency ==
In 1861 he emigrated to France to train anti-czarist Polish exiles. At the Paris Society of Polish Youth (Towarzystwa Młodzieży Polskiej) and at the Polish Military School (Polskiej Szkoły Wojskowej) he served as a military instructor and taught mathematics, strategy, tactics, artillery, and military history. He was a member of the radical democratic "red" left, and member of the Central National Committee. He was involved in negotiations with Russian revolutionaries, and a major planner of the future uprising. In 1862 he returned to Warsaw, Poland, and further helped plan the uprising set for spring of 1863. He also pushed for the abolition of serfdom.

== The January Uprising ==
When the January Uprising was set into motion, Padlewski was appointed general and took command of Polish insurgents in Warsaw and in the Płock Governorate. He was a member of the Provisional National Government (Tymczasowy Rząd Narodowy). He led his troops into the Puszczy Zagajnica forest of Kurpie where they skirmished with czarist forces near Myszyniec (9 March) and Drążdżewo (12 March). It is in this area, near Radzanów, the commander of the insurgents hid Zygmunt Padlewski with his division after Padlewski’s defeat at Myszyniec. Russian czarist troops, on 21 March, then moved into the area, and a battle near Radzanów was fought which resulted in Padlewski losing the conflict with 50 of his insurgents killed in action or drowned while escaping.

== Capture and execution ==
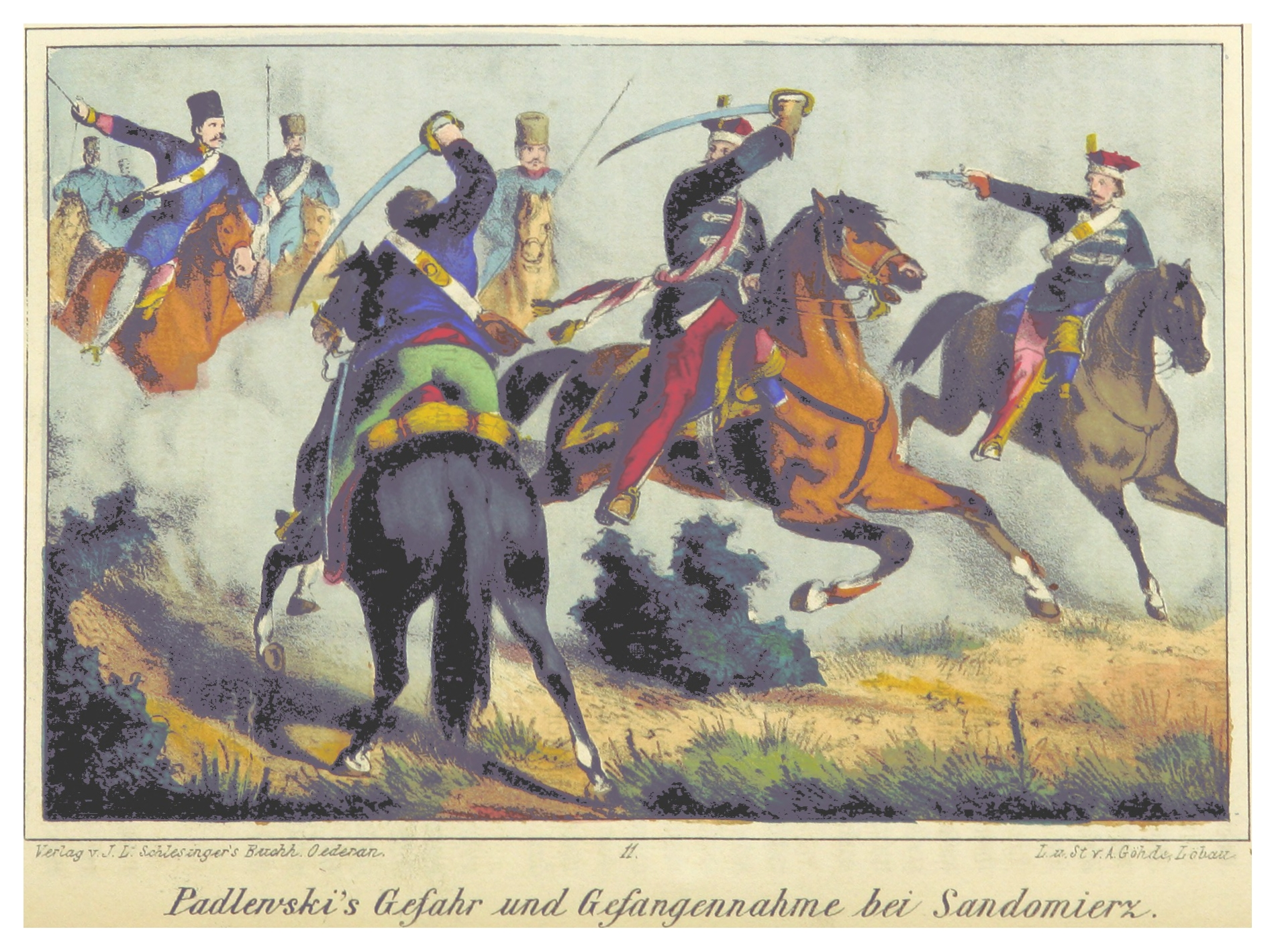
Padlewski's capture

Padlewski was ordered to return to Warsaw after this defeat, and, while en route, on 21 April, he was stopped by a czarist Cossack sentry at the small village of Bożymin and ordered to show his passport. Unfortunately, he showed the sentry an incorrect document, which resulted in the sentry searching his carriage and finding incriminating documents, as well as his insurgent uniform.

He was promptly arrested and placed in jail in Płock. Padlewski, who was only 27 years old, was court marshaled by Russian authorities and sentenced to death by firing squad. On May 15, 1863, he was transported through the streets of Płock to the execution place. The Polish population who lined the street watched and “women threw bouquets of flowers from the windows, so that the whole road was strewn with roses and violets.”

== Remembrance ==
Various monuments in Poland commemorate Padlewski. A school in Płock has been named after him, as well as street in the city. There are several other schools and streets across Poland named in his honor.

== See also ==
- January Uprising
- Jednorożec
