= Stara Kuźnica =

Stara Kuźnica may refer to the following places:

- Stara Kuźnica, Greater Poland Voivodeship (west-central Poland)
- Stara Kuźnica, Silesian Voivodeship (south Poland)
- Stara Kuźnica, Świętokrzyskie Voivodeship (south-central Poland)

== See also ==
- Kuźnica (disambiguation)
