= Kamień-Kolonia, Greater Poland Voivodeship =

Kamień-Kolonia
- Settlement
- Location within Poland
- Coordinates: 51°49′43″N 18°12′35″E
- Country: Poland
- Voivodeship: Greater Poland
- County: Kalisz
- Gmina: Ceków-Kolonia

Kamień-Kolonia (Polish pronunciation: [ˈkamjɛj̃ kɔˈlɔɲa]) is a settlement in the administrative district of Gmina Ceków-Kolonia, within Kalisz County, Greater Poland Voivodeship, in west-central Poland.
