= Gmina Opatówek =

Gmina Opatówek Opatówek Commune
- Gmina
- Coat of arms
- Interactive map of Gmina Opatówek
- Coordinates (Opatówek): 51°44′N 18°14′E
- Country: Poland
- Voivodeship: Greater Poland
- County: Kalisz County
- Seat: Opatówek

Area
  - Total: 104.32 km^{2} (40.28 sq mi)

Population (2006)
  - Total: 10,148
  - Density: 97.278/km^{2} (251.95/sq mi)
- Website: http://www.opatowek.pl

Gmina Opatówek is an urban-rural gmina (administrative district) in Kalisz County, Greater Poland Voivodeship, in west-central Poland. Its seat is the town of Opatówek (population 3,800), which lies approximately 11 kilometres (7 mi) east of Kalisz and 117 km (73 mi) south-east of the regional capital Poznań.

The gmina covers an area of 104.32 square kilometres (40.3 sq mi), and as of 2006 its total population is 10,148.

== Neighbouring gminas ==
Gmina Opatówek is bordered by the city of Kalisz and by the gminas of Ceków-Kolonia, Godziesze Wielkie, Koźminek, Szczytniki and Żelazków.

== Villages ==
The gmina contains the following villages: Bogumiłów, Borów, Chełmce, Cienia Druga, Cienia Pierwsza, Cienia Trzecia, Cienia-Folwark, Dębe-Kolonia, Frankowizna, Janików, Józefów, Kobierno, Michałów Czwarty, Michałów Drugi, Michałów Pierwszy, Michałów Trzeci, Modła, Nędzerzew, Nowa Tłokinia, Porwity, Rajsko, Rożdżały, Sierzchów, Słoneczna, Szałe, Szulec, Tłokinia Kościelna, Tłokinia Mała, Tłokinia Wielka, Trojanów, Warszew, Zawady, Zduny and Zmyślanka.

== Towns ==
Opatówek
