= Stare Prażuchy =

- Village
- Location within Poland
- Coordinates: 51°53′19″N 18°19′39″E
- Country: Poland
- Voivodeship: Greater Poland
- County: Kalisz
- Gmina: Ceków-Kolonia

Stare Prażuchy [ˈstarɛ praˈʐuxɨ] is a village in the administrative district of Gmina Ceków-Kolonia, within Kalisz County, Greater Poland Voivodeship, in west-central Poland.
