= Tłokinia Kościelna =

- Village
- Location within Poland
- Coordinates: 51°45′26″N 18°10′00″E
- Country: Poland
- Voivodeship: Greater Poland
- County: Kalisz
- Gmina: Opatówek
- Population: 540
- Website: http://www.tlokinia.rox.pl

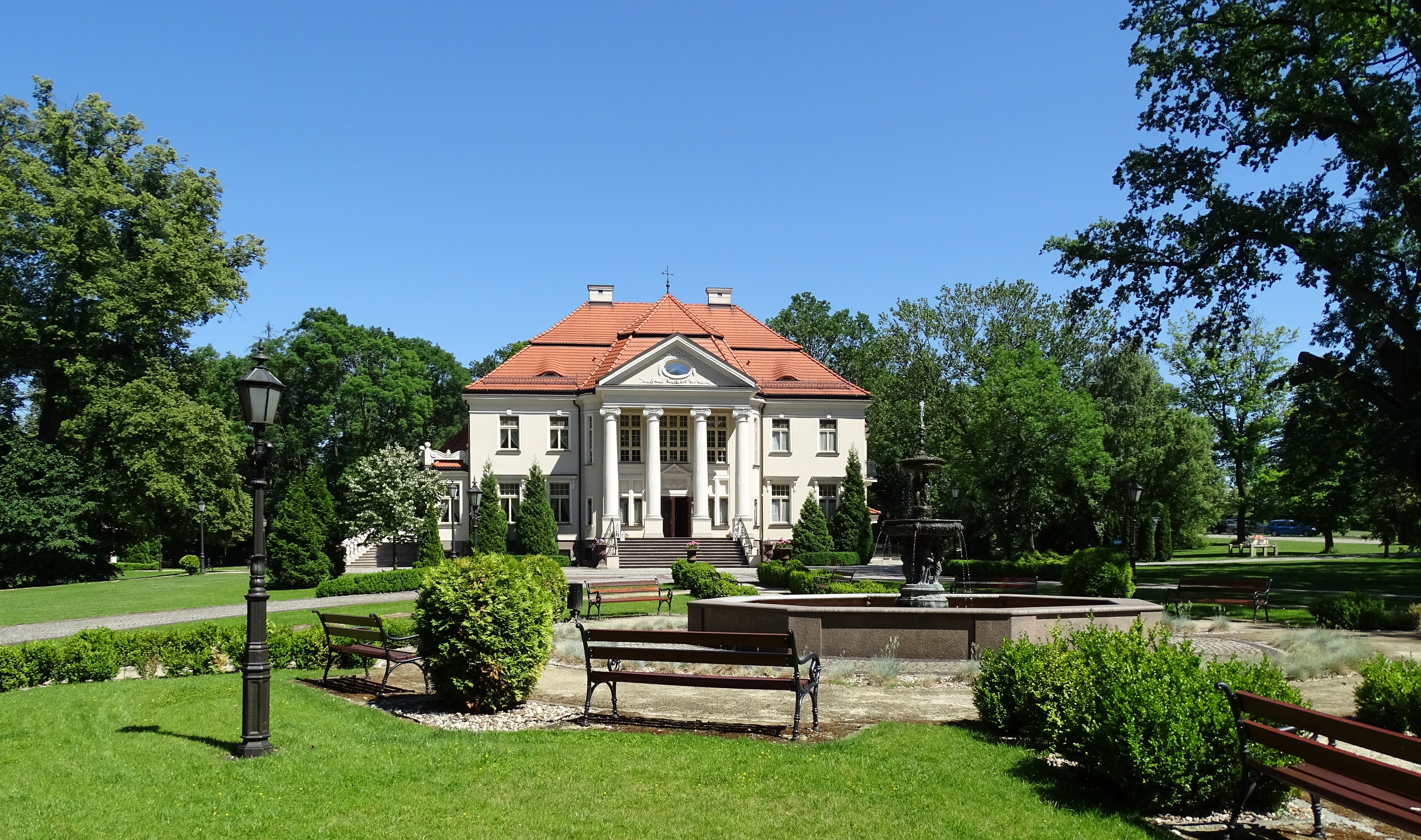
The manor house.

Tłokinia Kościelna [twɔˈkiɲa kɔɕˈt͡ɕɛlna] is a village in the administrative district of Gmina Opatówek, within Kalisz County, Greater Poland Voivodeship, in west-central Poland.
