= Bielawy, Kalisz County =

Bielawy
- Village
- Location within Poland
- Coordinates: 51°55′24″N 18°18′28″E
- Country: Poland
- Voivodeship: Greater Poland
- County: Kalisz
- Gmina: Ceków-Kolonia

Bielawy [bjɛˈlavɨ] is a village in the administrative district of Gmina Ceków-Kolonia, within Kalisz County, Greater Poland Voivodeship, in west-central Poland.
