= Olendry, Greater Poland Voivodeship =

Olendry
- Village
- Location within Poland
- Coordinates: 51°54′00″N 18°17′08″E
- Country: Poland
- Voivodeship: Greater Poland
- County: Kalisz
- Gmina: Ceków-Kolonia

Olendry [ɔˈlɛndrɨ] is a village in the administrative district of Gmina Ceków-Kolonia, within Kalisz County, Greater Poland Voivodeship, in west-central Poland.
