= Kobierno, Kalisz County =

Kobierno
- Village
- Location within Poland
- Coordinates: 51°46′55″N 18°12′22″E
- Country: Poland
- Voivodeship: Greater Poland
- County: Kalisz
- Gmina: Opatówek

Kobierno [kɔˈbjɛrnɔ] is a village in the administrative district of Gmina Opatówek, within Kalisz County, Greater Poland Voivodeship, in west-central Poland.
