= Szadek, Gmina Ceków-Kolonia =

Szadek
- Village
- Location within Poland
- Coordinates: 51°52′00″N 18°15′55″E
- Country: Poland
- Voivodeship: Greater Poland
- County: Kalisz
- Gmina: Ceków-Kolonia

Szadek [ˈʂadɛk] is a village in the administrative district of Gmina Ceków-Kolonia, within Kalisz County, Greater Poland Voivodeship, in west-central Poland.
