= Zmyślanka =

- Village
- Location within Poland
- Coordinates: 51°45′31″N 18°12′53″E
- Country: Poland
- Voivodeship: Greater Poland
- County: Kalisz
- Gmina: Opatówek

Zmyślanka [zmɨˈɕlanka] is a village in the administrative district of Gmina Opatówek, within Kalisz County, Greater Poland Voivodeship, in west-central Poland.
