= Józefów, Gmina Opatówek =

Józefów
- Village
- Location within Poland
- Coordinates: 51°44′1″N 18°15′25″E
- Country: Poland
- Voivodeship: Greater Poland
- County: Kalisz
- Gmina: Opatówek
- Population: 200

Józefów (Polish pronunciation: [juˈzɛfuf]) is a village in the administrative district of Gmina Opatówek, within Kalisz County, Greater Poland Voivodeship, in west-central Poland.
