= Nowa Plewnia =

- Village
- Location within Poland
- Coordinates: 51°52′15″N 18°18′25″E
- Country: Poland
- Voivodeship: Greater Poland
- County: Kalisz
- Gmina: Ceków-Kolonia

Nowa Plewnia [ˈnɔva ˈplɛvɲa] is a village in the administrative district of Gmina Ceków-Kolonia, within Kalisz County, Greater Poland Voivodeship, in west-central Poland.
