= Magdalenów, Greater Poland Voivodeship =

Magdalenów
- Village
- Location within Poland
- Coordinates: 51°49′12″N 18°12′47″E
- Country: Poland
- Voivodeship: Greater Poland
- County: Kalisz
- Gmina: Ceków-Kolonia

Magdalenów [maɡdaˈlɛnuf] is a village in the administrative district of Gmina Ceków-Kolonia, within Kalisz County, Greater Poland Voivodeship, in west-central Poland.
