= Orli Staw =

- Location within Poland
- Coordinates: 51°54′38″N 18°19′49″E
- Country: Poland
- Voivodeship: Greater Poland
- County: Kalisz
- Gmina: Ceków-Kolonia

Orli Staw [ˈɔrli ˈstaf] is a settlement in the administrative district of Gmina Ceków-Kolonia, within Kalisz County, Greater Poland Voivodeship, in west-central Poland.
