= Tłokinia Wielka =

- Village
- Location within Poland
- Coordinates: 51°45′N 18°12′E
- Country: Poland
- Voivodeship: Greater Poland
- County: Kalisz
- Gmina: Opatówek
- Population: 440
- Website: http://www.tlokinia.rox.pl

Tłokinia Wielka [twɔˈkiɲa ˈvjɛlka] is a village in the administrative district of Gmina Opatówek, within Kalisz County, Greater Poland Voivodeship, in west-central Poland.
