= Ceków-Kolonia =

- Village
- Location within Poland
- Coordinates: 51°53′N 18°18′E
- Country: Poland
- Voivodeship: Greater Poland
- County: Kalisz
- Gmina: Ceków-Kolonia

Ceków-Kolonia [ˈt͡sɛkuf kɔˈlɔɲa] is a village in Kalisz County, Greater Poland Voivodeship, in west-central Poland. It is the seat of the gmina (administrative district) called Gmina Ceków-Kolonia.
