= Rajsko, Greater Poland Voivodeship =

Rajsko
- Village
- Location within Poland
- Coordinates: 51°45′N 18°19′E
- Country: Poland
- Voivodeship: Greater Poland
- County: Kalisz
- Gmina: Opatówek

Rajsko (Polish pronunciation: [ˈrai̯skɔ]) is a village in the administrative district of Gmina Opatówek, within Kalisz County, Greater Poland Voivodeship, in west-central Poland.
