= Janików, Greater Poland Voivodeship =

Janików
- Village
- Location within Poland
- Coordinates: 51°45′43″N 18°18′47″E
- Country: Poland
- Voivodeship: Greater Poland
- County: Kalisz
- Gmina: Opatówek
- Population: 80

Janików [jaˈnikuf] is a village in the administrative district of Gmina Opatówek, within Kalisz County, Greater Poland Voivodeship, in west-central Poland.
