= Agaton Giller =

Polish politician, historian and journalist

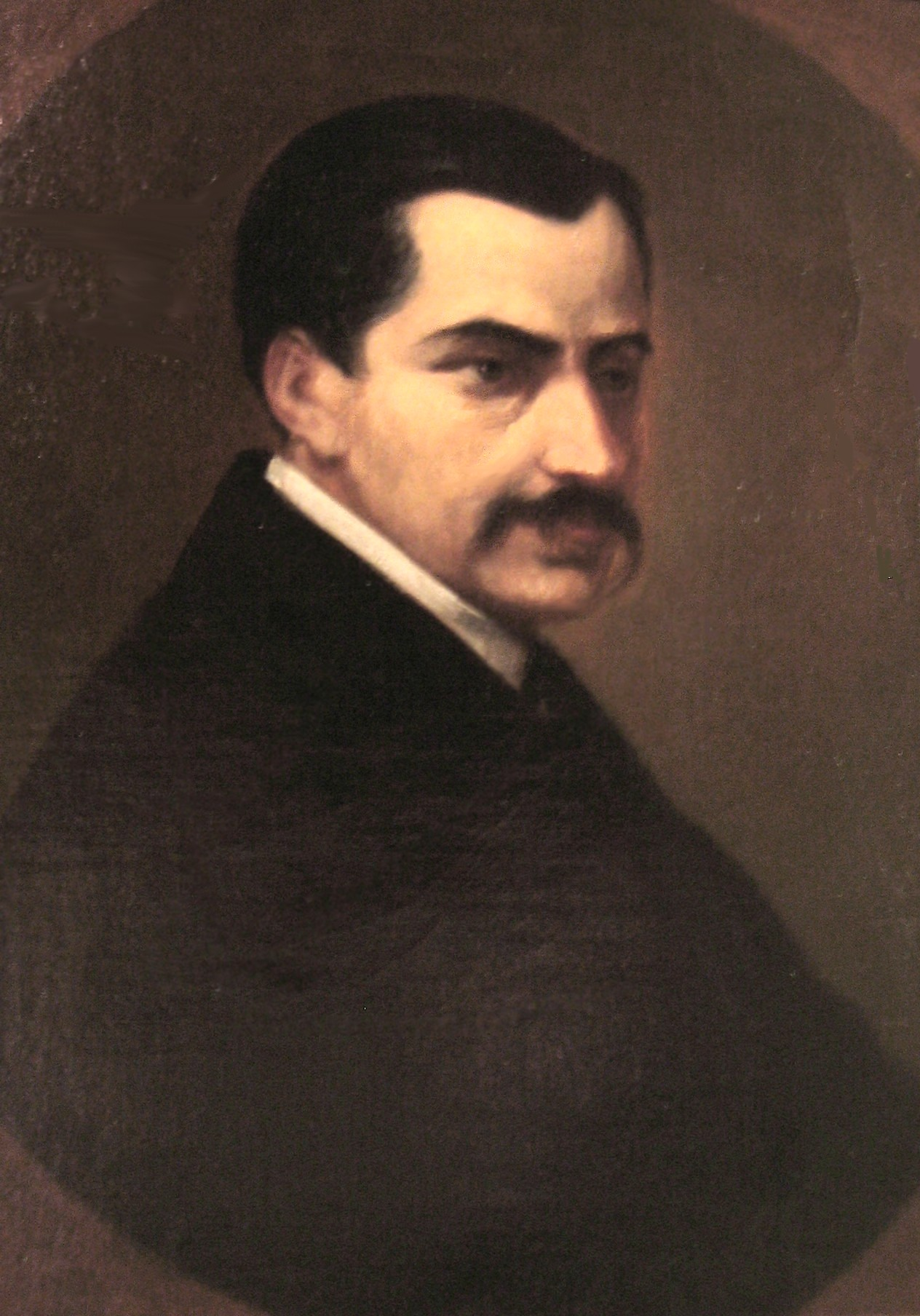
- Born: 1831; Opatówek, Congress Poland, Russian Empire
- Died: 1887 (aged 55–56); Stanisławów, Austro-Hungary
- Occupations: Politician, historian and journalist

Agaton Giller (1831 in Opatówek, Congress Poland, Russian Empire – 1887 in Stanisławów, Austro-Hungary) was a Polish historian, journalist and politician. He and his brother Stefan Giller played notable roles in the Polish independence movement and in the January 1863 Uprising.

== Life ==
He was a participant in the January Uprising and was one of the leaders of the "Red" faction among the insurrectionists as a member of the Central National Committee (Komitet Centralny Narodowy) and the Provisional National Government (Tymczasowy Rząd Narodowy). After being exiled to Siberia by the Imperial Russian authorities, he became the first Siberian historian and biographer of other deported Poles.

Later, in exile in Paris, he was a journalist with such periodicals as Ojczyzna (The Fatherland) and Kurier Paryski (The Paris Courier), a founder of Polish self-assistance organizations, and a founder of the Polish National Museum in Rapperswil, in Switzerland's Canton of St. Gallen.

He wrote many historical and biographical works, articles and studies.

He died in 1887 in Stanisławów. In 1980 his grave was repatriated from the closed Ivano-Frankivsk cemetery to Warsaw's Powązki Cemetery.

== Legacy ==
The Polish National Alliance, in the United States, considers Agaton Giller its "spiritual father."

== See also ==
- List of Poles
