= Smolanka, Podlaskie Voivodeship =

Smolanka
- Village
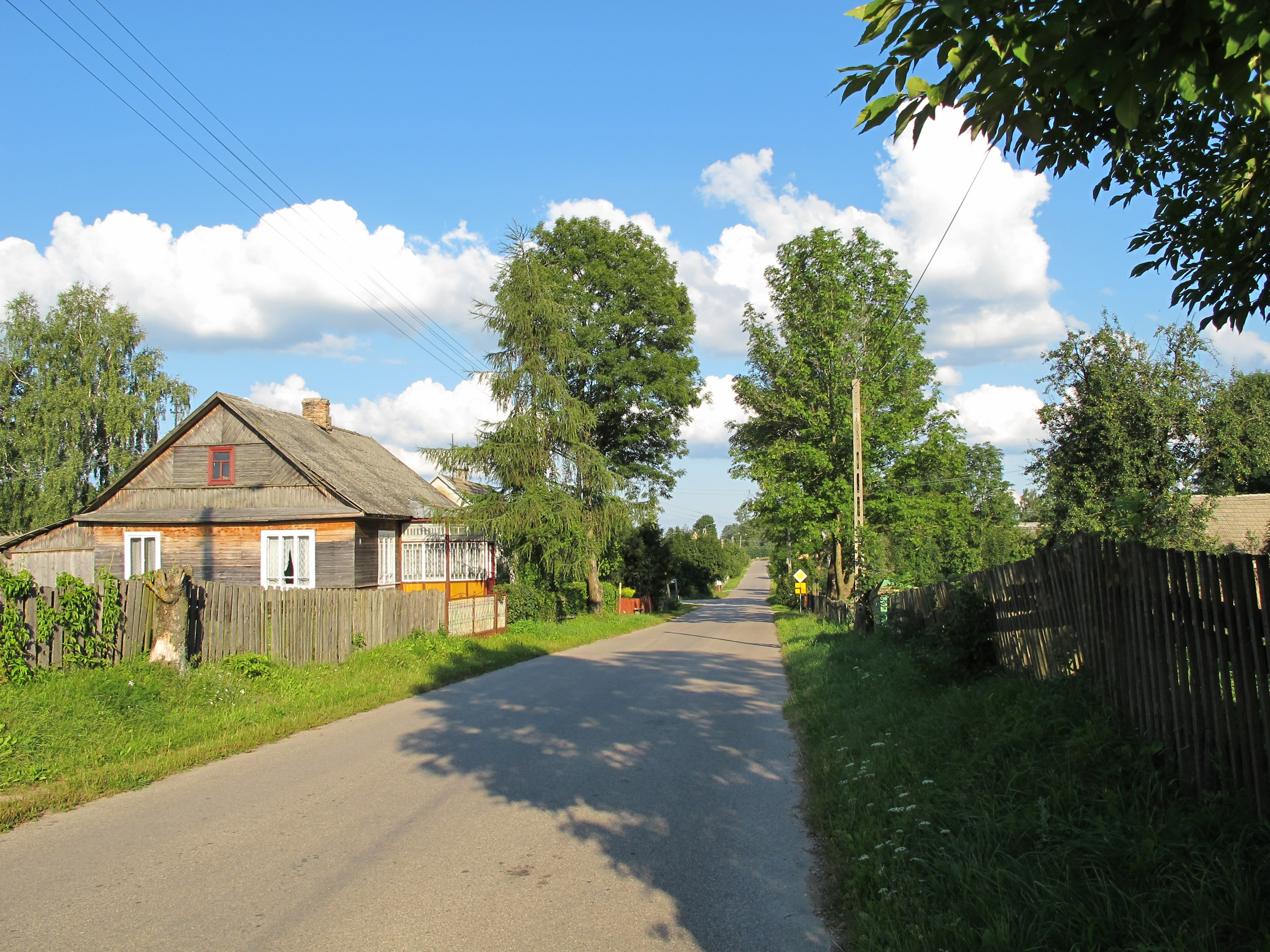
- View of Smolanka in August 2011

- Location within Poland
- Coordinates: 53°22′44″N 23°21′18″E
- Country: Poland
- Voivodeship: Podlaskie
- County: Sokółka
- Gmina: Sokółka
- Population: 60

Smolanka [smɔˈlaŋka] is a village in the administrative district of Gmina Sokółka, within Sokółka County, Podlaskie Voivodeship, in north-eastern Poland, close to the border with Belarus.
