= Central National Committee =

Polish insurrectionary organisation

- Komitet Centralny Narodowy
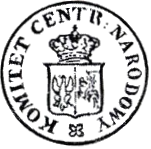
- Founded: June 1862
- Dissolved: January 1863
- Country: Congress Poland
- Allegiance: Polish–Lithuanian Commonwealth
- Headquarters: Warsaw
- Newspaper: Ruch
- Active regions: Partitioned Poland

The Central National Committee (Polish: Komitet Centralny Narodowy (KCN)) was the underground coordinating committee of the Polish independence movement in 1860s Congress Poland which was responsible for preparing a general uprising against Tsarist rule in order to reestablish Polish independence, lost after the Partitions of Poland. It represented the Red, left wing, faction in the independence movement, which emphasized an end to serfdom without compensation to landlords as a necessary component of the Polish national struggle, as opposed to the White faction which advocated more moderate social reforms, while also supporting Polish independence.

The committee was organized in June 1862, in Warsaw. After establishing underground cells, levying a national tax to fund the upcoming insurrection and appointing a Polish police, it issued a manifesto for the beginning of what became the January Uprising against the Russian Empire. Thereafter it transformed itself into the Polish National Government of Poland (on January 22, 1863).

Its main leaders included Stefan Bobrowski, Jarosław Dąbrowski, Zygmunt Padlewski, Agaton Giller, and Bronisław Szwarce. The official publication of the committee was the newspaper Ruch.
