= Stefan Giller =

Stefan Giller (1833–1918) was born in Opatówek, Congress Poland, Russian Empire. With his elder brother, Agaton Giller, Stefan played an active role in the Polish independence movement and in the January 1863 Uprising.

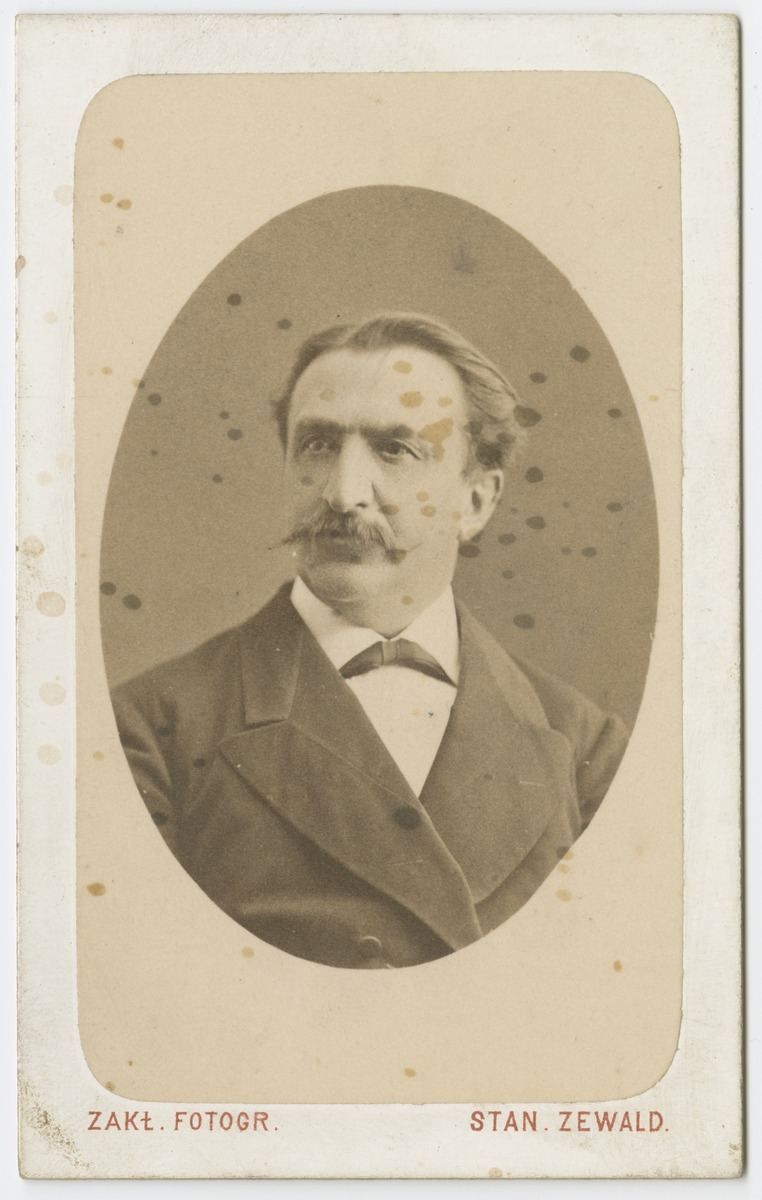
Image of Stefan Giller, was a poet.

== Life ==
Stefan Giller was a poet, an epigone of Polish Romanticism, a teacher of Polish language and literature at schools in Kalisz when the Imperial Russian government sought to eradicate the Polish language from public life. He was highly valued and respected by his students, who included the future president of Poland, Stanisław Wojciechowski, the future chancellor of the University of Vilnius, Alfons Parczewski, and many leading physicians and lawyers.

In 1997, librarians from Opatówek found many documents, letters, manuscripts, books and objects that had been owned by the Gillers, in their attic. The letters, the most valuable part of the find, have been published as Unknown Letters of the Giller Family.
