= Bronisław Szwarce =

Polish engineer, activist and translator (1834–1904)

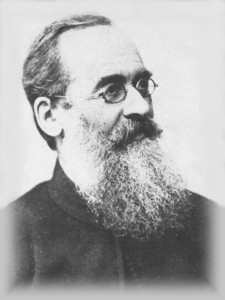
Bronisław Szwarce

Bronisław Antoni Szwarce (October 7, 1834–February 18, 1904) was a Polish engineer and political activist. Born in Inzinzac-Lochrist, Morbihan, France to Polish exiles and educated there. He graduated from the Ecole Centrale des Arts et Manufactures in Paris in 1855. He returned to Congress Poland and joined the radical democratic pro-independence underground. He became part of the Central National Committee but was arrested by the Russian authorities shortly before the January 1863 Uprising and exiled to Siberia. (The CNC became a provisional Polish government and Szwarce, had he not been arrested, would likely have become one of the Uprising's leaders.)

During his exile, Szwarce was one of the few people to meet Walerian Łukasiński, and became a mentor to future Polish leader Józef Piłsudski.

In Warsaw, Szwarce directed his cousin Emilia Heurich and her four daughters in the political activity of their safe house: the Heurich home at 5 Widok Street in Warsaw, which became the main meeting point of the Central National Committee.
