= Giller (fishing) =

Giller is a 19th-century term for a person who fishes using a gillnet, as used in the Chesapeake Bay region from the early 19th to the mid-20th centuries. Gillers worked individually or in groups of two or three men using a small boat from which they set and gathered a gillnet. Gillnets first appeared on the Potomac River in 1838 to fish for American shad, and rapidly became the most popular type of fishing gear in the bay region because they allowed the independent fisherman to work with limited resources, following the fish with his boat and net as they moved from place to place in search of food or to spawn. Gillnet fishing in Chesapeake Bay shad fisheries frequently led to conflict among states bordering the bay, with Pennsylvania seiners blaming Maryland gillers for over-harvesting and blocking shad passage upstream into the Susquehanna River, and Maryland gillers blaming Virginia pound-netters for intercepting fish on their northward migration up the bay. Conflicts sometimes erupted into violent confrontations, called "Gillers Wars," during one of which in 1876, a giller in Charles County, Maryland was indicted by the county court for assault with intent to kill the captains of a steamer and a tug. Upon trial he was found not guilty, but his case evidences the extent of the trouble between gillnetters and other bay users that led to involvement by state authorities in regulating fishing and settling disputes involving gillers.
