= Kosmów, Greater Poland Voivodeship =

Kosmów
- Village
- Location within Poland
- Coordinates: 51°53′N 18°16′E
- Country: Poland
- Voivodeship: Greater Poland
- County: Kalisz
- Gmina: Ceków-Kolonia

Kosmów [ˈkɔsmuf] is a village in the administrative district of Gmina Ceków-Kolonia, within Kalisz County, Greater Poland Voivodeship, in west-central Poland.
