= Józef Piotrowski =

- Born: 1840; Poland (then part of the Russian Empire)
- Died: 1923 (aged 82–83); Perm, Russia
- Known for: founding the first bookshop in Perm

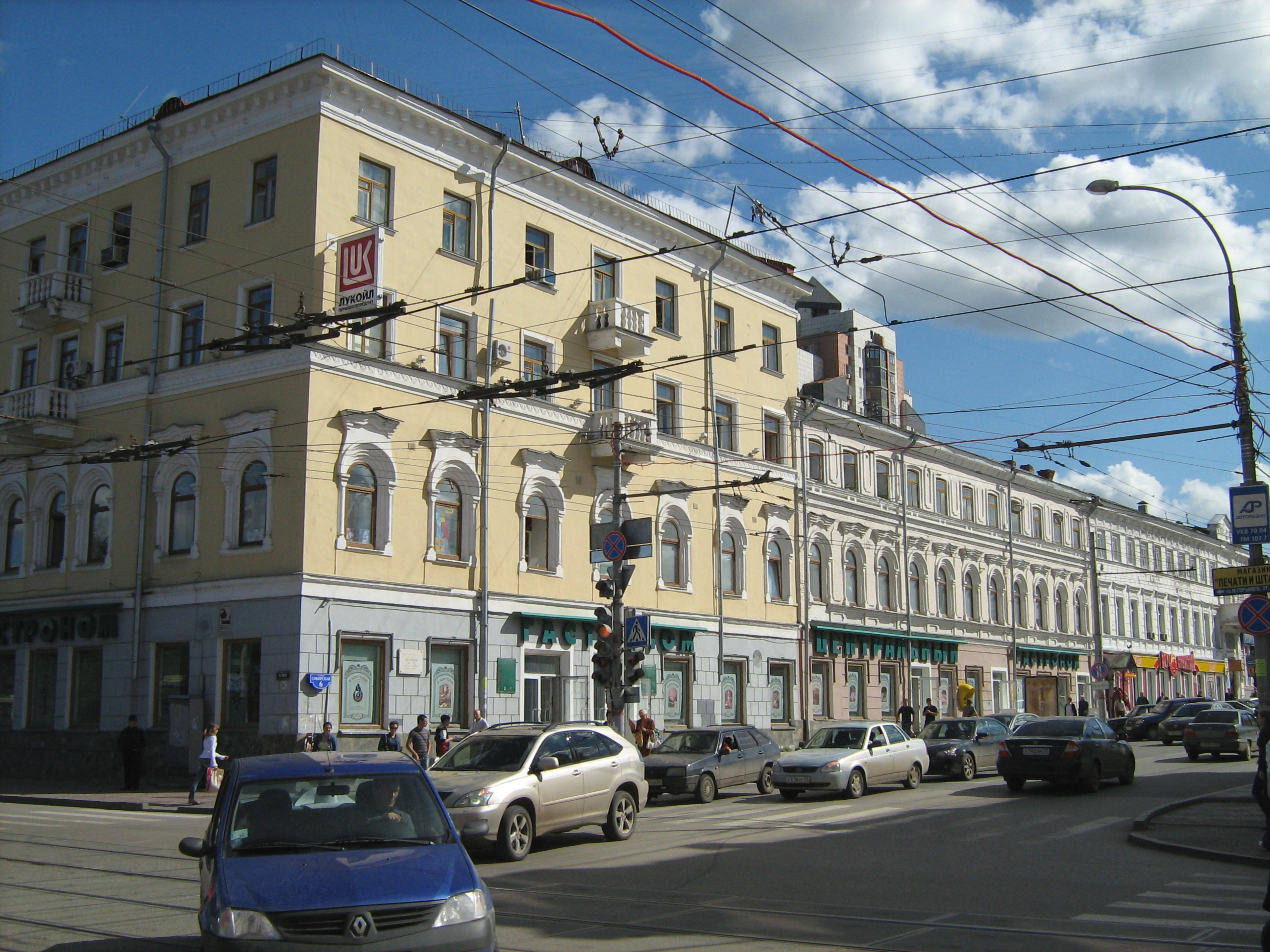
The building where was the Piotrowski Bookstore

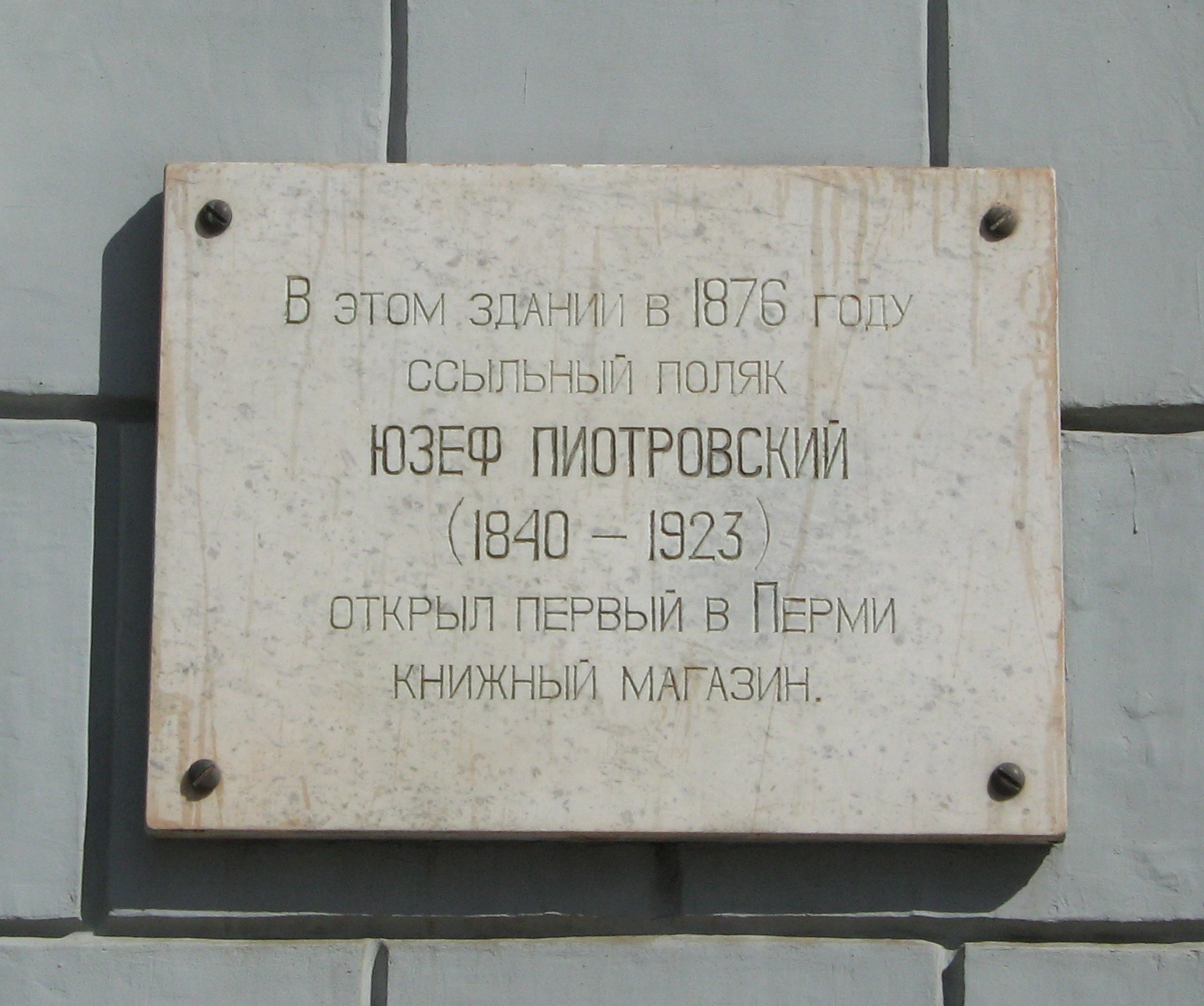
Memorial tablet

Józef Piotrowski (Russian: Юзеф Юлианович Пиотровский, 1840–1923), also known as Joseph Yulianovich Petrovsky (Russian: Иосиф Юлианович Петровский), was a participant in January Uprising and an enlightener. He is known as the founder of first bookshop in Perm.

Józef Piotrowski was born in 1840 in Poland, which for that time was in Russian Empire. For the participation in January Uprising he was sentenced to exile to Siberia and later to Perm. In winter of 1863 he opened a bookshop, registering it in the name of his wife, Olga Platonovna Petrovskaya. The shop was situated at the crossing of Pokrovskay Street and Sibirskaya Street. The Petrovsky Shop won popularity among the inhabitants and promoted the development of education in Perm. It was also used for underground distribution of democratic literature, which influenced on the formation of revolutionary opinions among the youth. This is testified by the documents of Petrovsky family kept in Perm Krai Museum. A memorial table is installed on the building where was the bookshop situated.

Józef Piotrowski died in 1923 and was buried at the Yegoshikhinskoye Cemetery.
