= Whites (January Uprising) =

Political faction during the January Uprising

- Biali
- Predecessor: Towarzystwo Rolnicze
- Formation: 1861
- Location: Kraków, Congress Poland
- Methods: Organic work
- Key people: Andrzej Artur Zamoyski

The Whites (Polish: Biali) were a faction among Polish insurrectionists before and during the January Uprising in early 1860s. They consisted mostly of progressive-minded landowners and industrialists, the middle class, and some intellectuals of Russian controlled Congress Poland. The faction had its origins in the Towarzystwo Rolnicze (Agricultural Society) started by Count Andrzej Artur Zamoyski in 1858. While the Whites supported ending serfdom, unlike the Red faction, they advocated for some kind of compensation to be made to the landlords. Also, unlike the Reds, the Whites generally opposed the idea of an armed insurrection against Russia, seeing it as doomed to failure. Instead, they tried to use diplomacy and the support of other European powers to win greater autonomy, a separate administration, and a native Polish army for Congress Poland. They also tried to influence the Tsar to engage in the recovery of former Polish lands, which had been taken by partitioning powers Austria and Prussia. However, once the January Uprising broke out, most Whites supported it both politically and militarily.

== Notable members ==
- Edward Jürgens
- Leopold Stanisław Kronenberg
- Karol Majewski
- Karol Ruprecht
- Andrzej Artur Zamoyski
