= Jamnice =

Jamnice may refer to the following places:

- Jamnice, a village in the Opava District in the Czech Republic
- Jamnice, a village within Kalisz County in Poland
