= Lipe =

Lipe may refer to:

- Ko Lipe, an island and resort in Thailand
- Lipe, Greater Poland Voivodeship, a village in Poland
- Lipe, Ljubljana, a village in the City Municipality of Ljubljana, Slovenia
- Lipe Trzecie, a village in Poland
- Lipe (Smederevo), a village near Smederevo, Serbia
- Lipe (Žagubica), a village near Žagubica, Serbia
- Bologna Guglielmo Marconi Airport near Bologna, Italy, ICAO code: LIPE
- Lipe (footballer), Brazilian footballer, full name Felipe Florencio da Silva

== See also ==
- Lipophilic efficiency (LiPE), a parameter used in medicinal chemistry
