= Korab (disambiguation) =

Korab may refer to:

- Korab, a mountain range in the Balkans
- Mount Korab, the highest mountain in the Korab
- Korab (given name), an Albanian masculine given name
- Korab (surname), a Polish surname
- Korab, Greater Poland Voivodeship, a village in west-central Poland
- Korab (deity), a Slavic god of the sea
