= Czajkowski =

Czajkowski (Polish pronunciation: [t͡ʂajˈkɔfskʲi], feminine: Czajkowska, plural: Czajkowscy) is a Polish noble family name for several coats of arms. The name derives from several locations names Czajki, Czajków, or Czajkowo, all derived from the name of the bird czajka, 'lapwing'.

Tchaikovsky is a transcription in various languages.

== People ==
- Adrian Czajkowski (born 1972), real name of British author Adrian Tchaikovsky
- Andrzej Czajkowski (1935–1982), Polish classical pianist and composer
- Antoni Czajkowski (1816–1873), Polish writer
- James Paul Czajkowski (born 1961), real name of American author James Rollins
- Jim Czajkowski (born 1963), American baseball player
- Jorge D. Czajkowski (born 1961), Argentine-Polish architect, scientist and writer
- Józef Czajkowski (1872–1947), Polish artist and architect
- Krystyna Czajkowska (born 1936), Polish volleyball player
- Michał Czajkowski (1804–1886), Polish-Ukrainian writer
- Michelle Fus (née Michelle Czajkowski; born 1988), creator of webcomic Ava's Demon
- Ryszard Czajkowski (born 1933), Polish geophysicist and writer
- Stanisław Czaykowski (1899–1933), Polish Count and motor racing driver
- Stanisław Czajkowski (1878–1954), Polish landscape painter
- Zbigniew Czajkowski (1921–2019), Polish fencer
- Zbigniew Czajkowski-Dębczyński (1926–1999), Polish participant in Warsaw Uprising
- Zofia Czajkowska (1905–1978), Polish musician and political prisoner

== Fictional characters ==
- Magda Czajkowski, character on British serial drama Eastenders

== See also ==
- Tchaikovsky (disambiguation)
