= Pruszkowski =

Pruszkowski (feminine: Pruszkowska, plural: Pruszkowscy) is a Polish surname. It may refer to:

- Pruszków County (Polish: powiat pruszkowski)
- Andrzej Pruszkowski (born 1960), Polish politician
- Tadeusz Pruszkowski (1888–1942), Polish painter
- Witold Pruszkowski (1846–1896), Polish painter

== See also ==
- Pruszków (disambiguation)
- Proskauer
