= Zamęty =

- Village
- Location within Poland
- Coordinates: 51°59′N 18°11′E
- Country: Poland
- Voivodeship: Greater Poland
- County: Kalisz
- Gmina: Mycielin
- Population: 262

Zamęty [zaˈmɛntɨ] is a village in the administrative district of Gmina Mycielin, within Kalisz County, Greater Poland Voivodeship, in west-central Poland.
