= Zajączek =

Zajączek may refer to:

- Zajączek, Lubusz Voivodeship, Poland, a village
- Zajączek, Pomeranian Voivodeship, Poland, a village
- Zajączek (surname)

== See also ==
- Zajączki
