= Budy Liskowskie =

- Village
- Location within Poland
- Coordinates: 51°49′1″N 18°24′33″E
- Country: Poland
- Voivodeship: Greater Poland
- County: Kalisz
- Gmina: Lisków

Budy Liskowskie [ˈbudɨ lisˈkɔfskʲɛ] is a village in the administrative district of Gmina Lisków, within Kalisz County, Greater Poland Voivodeship, in west-central Poland.
