= Rosocha, Kalisz County =

Rosocha
- Village
- Location within Poland
- Coordinates: 51°56′50″N 17°57′08″E
- Country: Poland
- Voivodeship: Greater Poland
- County: Kalisz
- Gmina: Blizanów

Rosocha [rɔˈsɔxa] is a village in the administrative district of Gmina Blizanów, within Kalisz County, Greater Poland Voivodeship, in west-central Poland.
