= Kurza, Poland =

Kurza
- Village
- Location within Poland
- Coordinates: 51°51′21″N 18°00′12″E
- Country: Poland
- Voivodeship: Greater Poland
- County: Kalisz
- Gmina: Blizanów

Kurza [ˈkuʐa] is a village in the administrative district of Gmina Blizanów, within Kalisz County, Greater Poland Voivodeship, in west-central Poland.
