= Klotyldów =

- Village
- Location within Poland
- Coordinates: 51°57′N 18°14′E
- Country: Poland
- Voivodeship: Greater Poland
- County: Kalisz
- Gmina: Mycielin

Klotyldów [klɔˈtɨlduf] is a village in the administrative district of Gmina Mycielin, within Kalisz County, Greater Poland Voivodeship, in west-central Poland.
