= Rychnów-Kolonia =

- Village
- Location within Poland
- Coordinates: 51°52′12″N 18°03′40″E
- Country: Poland
- Voivodeship: Greater Poland
- County: Kalisz
- Gmina: Blizanów

Rychnów-Kolonia [ˈrɨxnuf kɔˈlɔɲa] is a village in the administrative district of Gmina Blizanów, within Kalisz County, Greater Poland Voivodeship, in west-central Poland.
