= Dębniałki =

- Village
- Location within Poland
- Coordinates: 51°48′11″N 18°01′58″E
- Country: Poland
- Voivodeship: Greater Poland
- County: Kalisz
- Gmina: Blizanów

Dębniałki [dɛmbˈɲau̯ki] is a village in the administrative district of Gmina Blizanów, within Kalisz County, Greater Poland Voivodeship, in west-central Poland.
