= Gadow =

Gadow may refer to:

People

- Hans Friedrich Gadow, German ornithologist

Places

- Gadów, Greater Poland Voivodeship, Poland
- Gądów, Lower Silesian Voivodeship, Poland
