= Kościelec-Kolonia =

- Village
- Location within Poland
- Coordinates: 51°53′N 18°12′E
- Country: Poland
- Voivodeship: Greater Poland
- County: Kalisz
- Gmina: Mycielin

Kościelec-Kolonia [kɔɕˈt͡ɕɛlɛt͡s kɔˈlɔɲa] is a village in the administrative district of Gmina Mycielin, within Kalisz County, Greater Poland Voivodeship, in west-central Poland.
