= Kościelec, Kalisz County =

Kościelec
- Village
- Location within Poland
- Coordinates: 51°54′29″N 18°12′42″E
- Country: Poland
- Voivodeship: Greater Poland
- County: Kalisz
- Gmina: Mycielin
- Population (year 2021): 628

Kościelec [kɔɕˈt͡ɕɛlɛt͡s] is a village in the administrative district of Gmina Mycielin, within Kalisz County, Greater Poland Voivodeship, in west-central Poland.
