= Dzięcioły =

Dzięcioły may refer to the following places:

- Dzięcioły, Greater Poland Voivodeship (west-central Poland)
- Dzięcioły, Łosice County in Masovian Voivodeship (east-central Poland)
- Dzięcioły, Wołomin County in Masovian Voivodeship (east-central Poland)
