= Tchaikovsky (disambiguation) =

Pyotr Ilyich Tchaikovsky (1840–1893) was a Russian composer.

Tchaikovsky or variant spellings may also refer to:

- Tchaikovsky (surname), a Slavic surname (and list of people with the name)
- Chaikovskij (crater), an impact crater on Mercury
- Tchaikovsky (film), a 1969 Russian film
- "Tchaikovsky" (The Americans), a 2018 episode of The Americans
- "Tschaikowsky (and Other Russians)", an American patter song by Kurt Weill and Ira Gershwin and originally performed by Danny Kaye
- Chaykovsky, Perm Krai, a town in Russia
  - Snezhinka (ski jumping venue) near Chaykovsky, Perm Krai
- 2266 Tchaikovsky, an outer-belt asteroid
- Tchaikovsky Conservatory, a music school in Moscow, Russia
- Tchaikovsky Symphony Orchestra

== See also ==
- Czajkowski
- Chaykovsky (inhabited locality), a list of inhabited localities in Russia
- Circle of Tchaikovsky, Russian revolutionary organization
