= Mycielin =

Mycielin may refer to the following places:

- Mycielin, Kalisz County in Greater Poland Voivodeship (west-central Poland)
- Mycielin, Krotoszyn County in Greater Poland Voivodeship (west-central Poland)
- Mycielin, Lubusz Voivodeship (west Poland)
- Mycielin, Warmian-Masurian Voivodeship (north Poland)
