= Ostrów Kaliski =

- Village
- Location within Poland
- Coordinates: 51°32′41″N 18°12′15″E
- Country: Poland
- Voivodeship: Greater Poland
- County: Kalisz
- Gmina: Brzeziny

Ostrów Kaliski [ˈɔstruf kaˈliski] is a village in the administrative district of Gmina Brzeziny, within Kalisz County, Greater Poland Voivodeship, in west-central Poland.
