= Zakrzyn-Kolonia =

- Village
- Location within Poland
- Coordinates: 51°51′18″N 18°21′01″E
- Country: Poland
- Voivodeship: Greater Poland
- County: Kalisz
- Gmina: Lisków

Zakrzyn-Kolonia [ˈzakʂɨn kɔˈlɔɲa] is a village in the administrative district of Gmina Lisków, within Kalisz County, Greater Poland Voivodeship, in west-central Poland.
