= Dzierzbin-Kolonia =

- Village
- Location within Poland
- Coordinates: 52°00′00″N 18°14′05″E
- Country: Poland
- Voivodeship: Greater Poland
- County: Kalisz
- Gmina: Mycielin

Dzierzbin-Kolonia [ˈd͡ʑɛʐbin kɔˈlɔɲa] is a village in the administrative district of Gmina Mycielin, within Kalisz County, Greater Poland Voivodeship, in west-central Poland.
