= Annówka, Greater Poland Voivodeship =

Annówka
- Village
- Location within Poland
- Coordinates: 51°59′32″N 18°13′48″E
- Country: Poland
- Voivodeship: Greater Poland
- County: Kalisz
- Gmina: Mycielin

Annówka [anˈnufka] is a village in the administrative district of Gmina Mycielin, within Kalisz County, Greater Poland Voivodeship, in west-central Poland.
