= Maryan Bakalarczyk =

Belgian footballer (1927–2021)

Personal information
- Date of birth: 27 October 1927
- Place of birth: Zagorna, Poland
- Date of death: 9 April 2021 (aged 93)
- Place of death: Liège, Belgium
- Positions: Midfielder; defender

Senior career*
Years	Team	Apps	(Gls)
1945–1949	R.F.C. Tilleur		
1949–1954	Charleroi	120	(14)
1954–1957	Standard Liège	53	
- * Club domestic league appearances and goals

Maryan Bakalarczyk (27 October 1927 – 9 April 2021) was a Belgian footballer who played as a midfielder or defender.

== Club career ==
Bakalarczyk was born in Zagorna, Poland. He played for R.F.C. Tilleur from 1945 to 1949 appearing in the Belgian First Division and Belgian Second Division. He joined R. Charleroi S.C. along with his brother Stanislav in 1949. He went on to play 120 matches scoring 14 goals in the First Division for Charleroi until 1954. He made 53 appearances in the First Division for Standard Liège between 1954 and 1957. An accident at work in summer 1958 required the amputation of a foot ending his career as a footballer.

A naturalised Belgian, Bakalarczyk represented Belgium internationally at youth level.

He died on 9 April 2021, aged 93.
