= Żerniki, Kalisz County =

Żerniki
- Village
- Location within Poland
- Coordinates: 51°52′N 17°59′E
- Country: Poland
- Voivodeship: Greater Poland
- County: Kalisz
- Gmina: Blizanów

Żerniki (Polish pronunciation: [ʐɛrˈɲikʲi]) is a village in the administrative district of Gmina Blizanów, within Kalisz County, Greater Poland Voivodeship, in west-central Poland.
