= Biskupice, Kalisz County =

Biskupice
- Village
- Location within Poland
- Coordinates: 51°53′34″N 17°58′16″E
- Country: Poland
- Voivodeship: Greater Poland
- County: Kalisz
- Gmina: Blizanów

Biskupice [biskuˈpit͡sɛ] is a village in the administrative district of Gmina Blizanów, within Kalisz County, Greater Poland Voivodeship, in west-central Poland.
