= Brzezina, Greater Poland Voivodeship =

Brzezina
- Village
- Location within Poland
- Coordinates: 51°54′19″N 18°03′42″E
- Country: Poland
- Voivodeship: Greater Poland
- County: Kalisz
- Gmina: Blizanów

Brzezina [bʐɛˈʑina] is a village in the administrative district of Gmina Blizanów, within Kalisz County, Greater Poland Voivodeship, in west-central Poland.
