= Fajum, Greater Poland Voivodeship =

Fajum
- Village
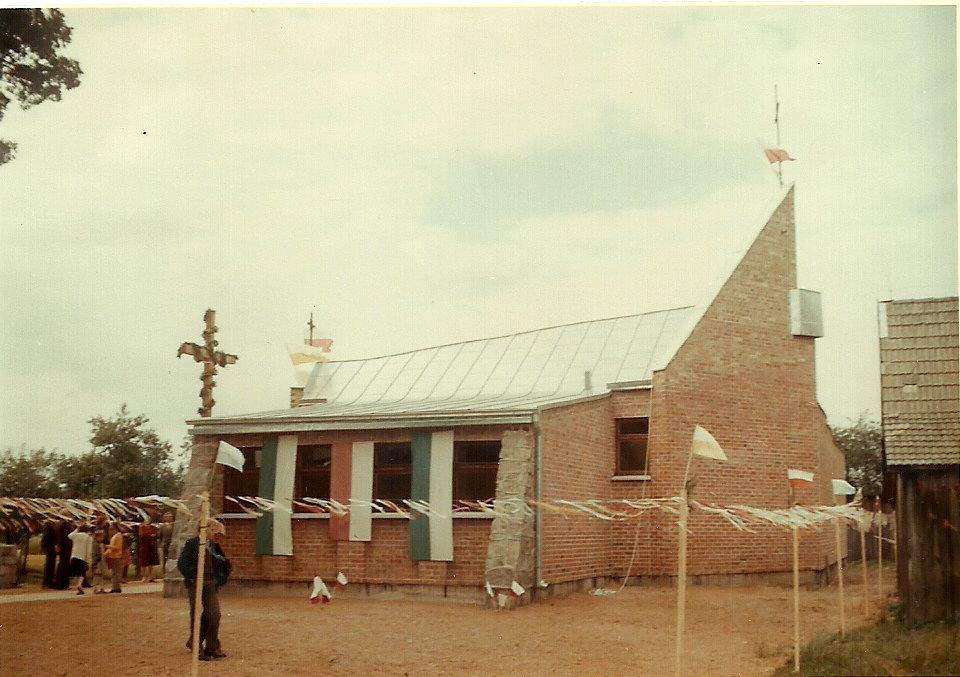
- Chapel in Fajum

- Location within Poland
- Coordinates: 51°33′N 18°21′E
- Country: Poland
- Voivodeship: Greater Poland
- County: Kalisz
- Gmina: Brzeziny

Fajum [ˈfajum] is a village in the administrative district of Gmina Brzeziny, within Kalisz County, Greater Poland Voivodeship, in west-central Poland. It is named after Faiyum in Egypt.
