= Dzierzbin =

- Village
- Location within Poland
- Coordinates: 51°59′41″N 18°14′39″E
- Country: Poland
- Voivodeship: Greater Poland
- County: Kalisz
- Gmina: Mycielin
- Population: 495

Dzierzbin [ˈd͡ʑɛʐbin] a village in the administrative district of Gmina Mycielin, within Kalisz County, Greater Poland Voivodeship, in west-central Poland.
