= Zajączki =

Zajączki may refer to the following places:

- Zajączki, Kalisz County in Greater Poland Voivodeship (west-central Poland)
- Zajączki, Ostrzeszów County in Greater Poland Voivodeship (west-central Poland)
- Zajączki, Podlaskie Voivodeship (north-east Poland)
- Zajączki, Lidzbark County in Warmian-Masurian Voivodeship (north Poland)
- Zajączki, Ostróda County in Warmian-Masurian Voivodeship (north Poland)

== See also ==
- Zajączki Bankowe
- Zajączki Pierwsze ("First Zajączki")
- Zajączki Drugie ("Second Zajączki")
- Zajączek
