= Annopol, Kalisz County =

Annopol
- Village
- Location within Poland
- Coordinates: 51°52′N 18°21′E
- Country: Poland
- Voivodeship: Greater Poland
- County: Kalisz
- Gmina: Lisków
- Time zone: UTC+1 (CET)
  - Summer (DST): UTC+2 (CEST)

Annopol [anˈnɔpɔl] is a village in the administrative district of Gmina Lisków, within Kalisz County, Greater Poland Voivodeship, in central Poland.
