= Danefæ =

Danish legal concept

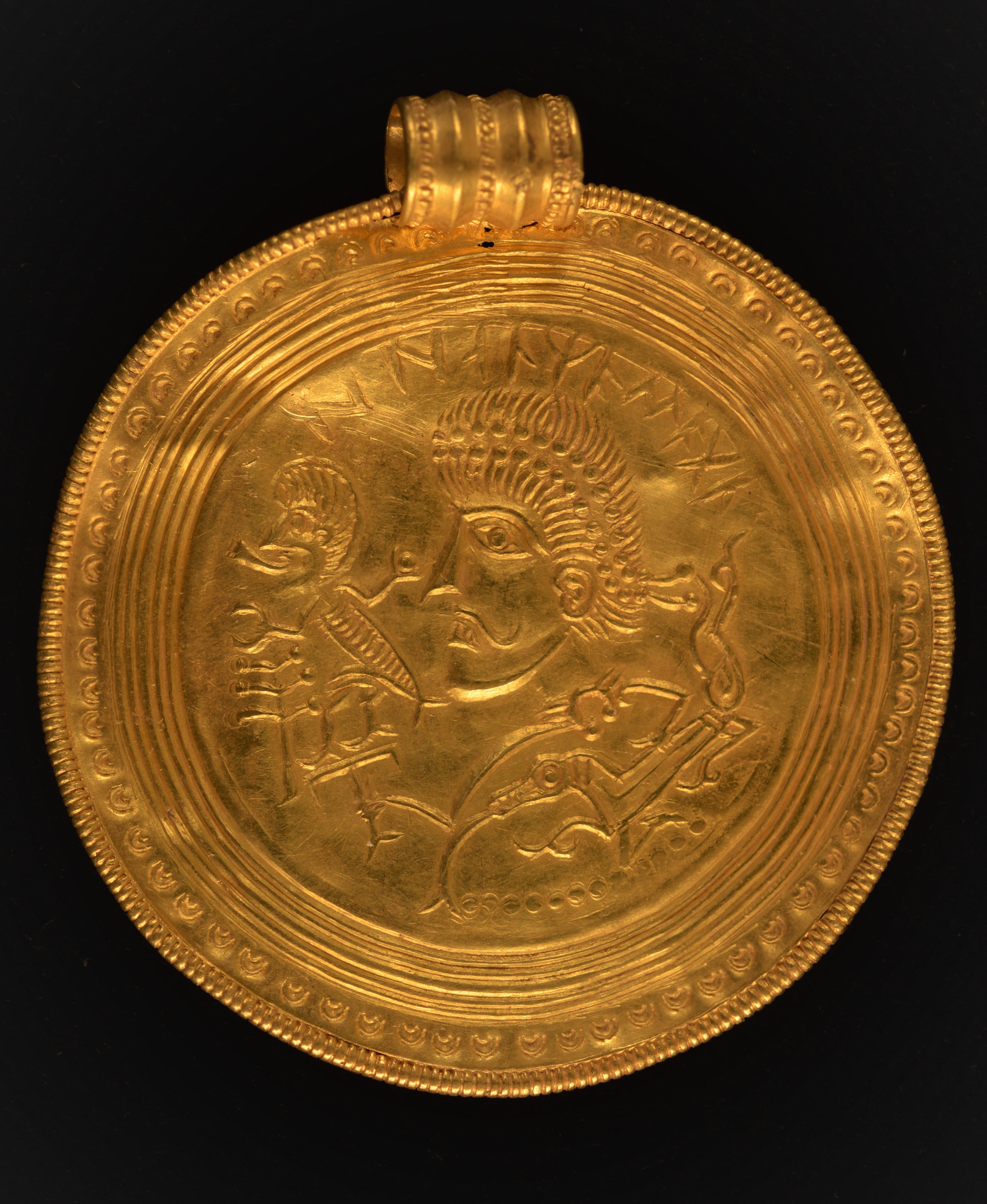
An example of danefæ: A gold bracteate discovered by a metal detectorist in 2020 in Vindelev, Denmark.

Danefæ [ˈdæːnəˌfεˀ] (from Old Norse Dánarfé, "property of the dead") is a Danish legal concept referring to valuable objects discovered in Denmark that have no identifiable owner. To be considered Danefæ, the goods must also be older than a certain, undefined age, usually considered at least 100 years. Under Danish law, goods considered Danefæ are the property of the state. Danefæ is analogous to the English legal concept of treasure trove.

== History ==
The first known version of the Danefæ law dates back to the 13th Century. The original purpose of the law was fiscal in nature. Precious metal objects discovered in Denmark would be sent to the Treasury to be melted down and minted as coins. In later centuries, certain objects with historical value, such as the golden horns of Gallehus, were kept intact in the crown's collection.

The Danefæ law was modernized and codified by the Act on Museums of 1984, later revised in 1989. The law expanded the definition of Danefæ to include any object of "special cultural heritage value." Anyone finding Danefæ must turn it in to the Danish State Antiquary. The State Antiquary will pay a reward "on the basis of the value of the material and rarity of the find and also of the care with which the finder has safeguarded the find."

== Impact ==
The modern version of the Danefæ law has encouraged a thriving amateur metal detecting culture in Denmark, which has helped to uncover and preserve a large number of artifacts. In many cases, Danefæ finds made by amateur detectorists have uncovered previously unknown archaeological sites. Denmark's legal framework around amateur archaeology is in stark contrast to nearby states, such as Sweden, where amateur metal detecting is heavily restricted.

The 1989 revision of the museum law expanded Danefæ to include rare and exceptional fossils, rocks, and minerals, under the neologistic term Danekræ.

== See also ==
- Hoard
- Lost, mislaid, and abandoned property
- Danish History
