= Czajków-Kolonia =

- Village
- Country: Poland
- Voivodeship: Greater Poland
- County: Kalisz
- Gmina: Blizanów

Czajków-Kolonia [ˈt͡ʂai̯kuf kɔˈlɔɲa] is a village in the administrative district of Gmina Blizanów, within Kalisz County, Greater Poland Voivodeship, in west-central Poland.
