= Nowiny, Kalisz County =

Nowiny
- Village
- Location within Poland
- Coordinates: 51°57′13″N 18°11′07″E
- Country: Poland
- Voivodeship: Greater Poland
- County: Kalisz
- Gmina: Mycielin

Nowiny [nɔˈvinɨ] is a village in the administrative district of Gmina Mycielin, within Kalisz County, Greater Poland Voivodeship, in west-central Poland.
