= Skrajnia Blizanowska =

- Village
- Location within Poland
- Coordinates: 51°53′49″N 18°01′42″E
- Country: Poland
- Voivodeship: Greater Poland
- County: Kalisz
- Gmina: Blizanów

Skrajnia Blizanowska [ˈskrai̯ɲa blizaˈnɔfska] is a village in the administrative district of Gmina Blizanów, within Kalisz County, Greater Poland Voivodeship, in west-central Poland.
