= Żychów =

- Village
- Location within Poland
- Coordinates: 51°50′33″N 18°21′41″E
- Country: Poland
- Voivodeship: Greater Poland
- County: Kalisz
- Gmina: Lisków
- Population: 180

Żychów [ˈʐɨxuf] is a village in the administrative district of Gmina Lisków, within Kalisz County, Greater Poland Voivodeship, in west-central Poland.
