= Jarantów-Kolonia =

- Village
- Location within Poland
- Coordinates: 51°58′09″N 18°03′48″E
- Country: Poland
- Voivodeship: Greater Poland
- County: Kalisz
- Gmina: Blizanów

Jarantów-Kolonia [jaˈrantuf kɔˈlɔɲa] is a village in the administrative district of Gmina Blizanów, within Kalisz County, Greater Poland Voivodeship, in west-central Poland.
