= Strzałków =

Strzałków may refer to the following places:

- Strzałków, Łódź Voivodeship (central Poland)
- Strzałków, Masovian Voivodeship (east-central Poland)
- Strzałków, Świętokrzyskie Voivodeship (south-central Poland)
- Strzałków, Greater Poland Voivodeship (west-central Poland)
