= Grodzisk, Greater Poland Voivodeship =

Grodzisk
- Village
- Location within Poland
- Coordinates: 51°54′04″N 17°57′53″E
- Country: Poland
- Voivodeship: Greater Poland
- County: Kalisz
- Gmina: Blizanów

Grodzisk [ˈɡrɔd͡ʑisk] is a village in the administrative district of Gmina Blizanów, within Kalisz County, Greater Poland Voivodeship, in west-central Poland.
