= Stropieszyn, Greater Poland Voivodeship =

Stropieszyn
- Village
- Location within Poland
- Coordinates: 51°55′N 18°15′E
- Country: Poland
- Voivodeship: Greater Poland
- County: Kalisz
- Gmina: Mycielin
- Population: 324

Stropieszyn [strɔˈpjɛʂɨn] (1940-1945 German: Fasanenteich) a village in the administrative district of Gmina Mycielin, within Kalisz County, Greater Poland Voivodeship, in west-central Poland.
