= Blizanówek =

- Village
- Location within Poland
- Coordinates: 51°54′30″N 18°1′31″E
- Country: Poland
- Voivodeship: Greater Poland
- County: Kalisz
- Gmina: Blizanów

Blizanówek [blizaˈnuvɛk] is a village in the administrative district of Gmina Blizanów, within Kalisz County, Greater Poland Voivodeship, in west-central Poland.
