= Słuszków =

- Village
- Location within Poland
- Coordinates: 51°56′N 18°15′E
- Country: Poland
- Voivodeship: Greater Poland
- County: Kalisz
- Gmina: Mycielin

Słuszków [ˈswuʂkuf] (1940–1945 German: Steinsdorf) a village in Kalisz County, Greater Poland Voivodeship, in west-central Poland. It is the seat of the administrative district of Gmina Mycielin.

In 1935 the "Słuszków Hoard" was discovered there.
