= Aleksandria, Greater Poland Voivodeship =

Aleksandria
- Village
- Location within Poland
- Coordinates: 51°36′45″N 18°13′32″E
- Country: Poland
- Voivodeship: Greater Poland
- County: Kalisz
- Gmina: Brzeziny
- Population: 530
- Time zone: UTC+1 (CET)
  - Summer (DST): UTC+2 (CEST)
- Postal code: 62-874
- ISO 3166 code: POL
- Vehicle registration: PCA

Aleksandria [alɛkˈsandrja] is a village in the administrative district of Gmina Brzeziny, within Kalisz County, Greater Poland Voivodeship, in west-central Poland.
