= Chrusty, Gmina Lisków =

Chrusty
- Village
- Location within Poland
- Coordinates: 51°52′01″N 18°25′17″E
- Country: Poland
- Voivodeship: Greater Poland
- County: Kalisz
- Gmina: Lisków

Chrusty [ˈxrustɨ] is a village in the administrative district of Gmina Lisków, within Kalisz County, Greater Poland Voivodeship, in west-central Poland.
