= Pamięcin =

Pamięcin may refer to the following places:

- Pamięcin, Greater Poland Voivodeship (west-central Poland)
- Pamięcin, Lubusz Voivodeship (west Poland)
- Pamięcin, West Pomeranian Voivodeship (north-west Poland)
