= Lisków-Rzgów =

- Village
- Location within Poland
- Coordinates: 51°50′16″N 18°22′27″E
- Country: Poland
- Voivodeship: Greater Poland
- County: Kalisz
- Gmina: Lisków

Lisków-Rzgów [ˈliskuf ˈʐɡuf] is a village in the administrative district of Gmina Lisków, within Kalisz County, Greater Poland Voivodeship, in west-central Poland.
