= Pieczyska, Kalisz County =

Pieczyska
- Village
- Location within Poland
- Coordinates: 51°34′N 18°15′E
- Country: Poland
- Voivodeship: Greater Poland
- County: Kalisz
- Gmina: Brzeziny

Pieczyska [pjɛˈt͡ʂɨska] is a village in the administrative district of Gmina Brzeziny, within Kalisz County, Greater Poland Voivodeship, in west-central Poland.
