= Teodorów, Greater Poland Voivodeship =

Teodorów
- Village
- Location within Poland
- Coordinates: 51°58′N 18°17′E
- Country: Poland
- Voivodeship: Greater Poland
- County: Kalisz
- Gmina: Mycielin
- Population: 61

Teodorów [tɛɔˈdɔruf] is a village in the administrative district of Gmina Mycielin, within Kalisz County, Greater Poland Voivodeship, in west-central Poland.
