= Wrząca, Kalisz County =

Wrząca
- Village
- Location within Poland
- Coordinates: 51°37′22″N 18°14′12″E
- Country: Poland
- Voivodeship: Greater Poland
- County: Kalisz
- Gmina: Brzeziny

Wrząca [ˈvʐɔnt͡sa] is a village in the administrative district of Gmina Brzeziny, within Kalisz County, Greater Poland Voivodeship, in west-central Poland.
