= Janków Drugi =

- Village
- Location within Poland
- Coordinates: 51°54′24″N 17°59′09″E
- Country: Poland
- Voivodeship: Greater Poland
- County: Kalisz
- Gmina: Blizanów

Janków Drugi [ˈjankuf ˈdruɡi] is a village in the administrative district of Gmina Blizanów, within Kalisz County, Greater Poland Voivodeship, in west-central Poland.
