= Czempisz =

- Village
- Location within Poland
- Coordinates: 51°35′N 18°17′E
- Country: Poland
- Voivodeship: Greater Poland
- County: Kalisz
- Gmina: Brzeziny

Czempisz [ˈt͡ʂɛmpiʂ] is a village in the administrative district of Gmina Brzeziny, within Kalisz County, Greater Poland Voivodeship, in west-central Poland.
