= Chudoba, Greater Poland Voivodeship =

Chudoba
- Village
- Location within Poland
- Coordinates: 51°33′52″N 18°21′48″E
- Country: Poland
- Voivodeship: Greater Poland
- County: Kalisz
- Gmina: Brzeziny

Chudoba [xuˈdɔba] is a village in the administrative district of Gmina Brzeziny, within Kalisz County, Greater Poland Voivodeship, in west-central Poland.
