= Grabek, Greater Poland Voivodeship =

Grabek
- Village
- Location within Poland
- Coordinates: 51°57′21″N 18°15′39″E
- Country: Poland
- Voivodeship: Greater Poland
- County: Kalisz
- Gmina: Mycielin
- Population: 80

Grabek [ˈɡrabɛk] is a village in the administrative district of Gmina Mycielin, within Kalisz County, Greater Poland Voivodeship, in west-central Poland.
