= Kazala Nowa =

- Settlement
- Location within Poland
- Coordinates: 51°57′58″N 18°13′14″E
- Country: Poland
- Voivodeship: Greater Poland
- County: Kalisz
- Gmina: Mycielin
- Population: 30

Kazala Nowa [kaˈzala ˈnɔva] is a settlement in the administrative district of Gmina Mycielin, within Kalisz County, Greater Poland Voivodeship, in west-central Poland.
