= Gmina Brzeziny =

Gmina Brzeziny may refer to either of the following rural administrative districts in Poland:

- Gmina Brzeziny, Łódź Voivodeship
- Gmina Brzeziny, Greater Poland Voivodeship
