= Przystajnia-Kolonia =

- Village
- Location within Poland
- Coordinates: 51°35′06″N 18°12′22″E
- Country: Poland
- Voivodeship: Greater Poland
- County: Kalisz
- Gmina: Brzeziny

Przystajnia-Kolonia [pʂɨsˈtai̯ɲa kɔˈlɔɲa] is a village in the administrative district of Gmina Brzeziny, within Kalisz County, Greater Poland Voivodeship, in west-central Poland.
