= Kuszyn =

- Village
- Location within Poland
- Coordinates: 51°53′18″N 18°13′39″E
- Country: Poland
- Voivodeship: Greater Poland
- County: Kalisz
- Gmina: Mycielin
- Population: 262

Kuszyn [ˈkuʂɨn] is a village in the administrative district of Gmina Mycielin, within Kalisz County, Greater Poland Voivodeship, in west-central Poland.
