= Szadek-Kolonia =

- Village
- Location within Poland
- Coordinates: 51°49′55″N 18°02′29″E
- Country: Poland
- Voivodeship: Greater Poland
- County: Kalisz
- Gmina: Blizanów

Szadek-Kolonia [ˈʂadɛk kɔˈlɔɲa] is a village in the administrative district of Gmina Blizanów, within Kalisz County, Greater Poland Voivodeship, in west-central Poland.
