= Janków Pierwszy =

- Village
- Location within Poland
- Coordinates: 51°54′10″N 17°58′42″E
- Country: Poland
- Voivodeship: Greater Poland
- County: Kalisz
- Gmina: Blizanów
- Population: 200

Janków Pierwszy [ˈjankuf ˈpjɛrfʂɨ] is a village in the administrative district of Gmina Blizanów, within Kalisz County, Greater Poland Voivodeship, in west-central Poland.

== Schools ==
The School Complex in Janków Pierwszy, originally named Zespół Szkół w Jankowie Pierwszym, is the only educational institution in Janków Pierwszy. It consists of the Public Local Kindergarten, the Primary School, and the Junior High School.

Here is a historical overview of the progress of schools:

1945–1946: The authorities of the Blizanów commune decide to build a school in Jankow Pierwszy.

1952: The ceremonial opening of the institution.

1958: A kindergarten was opened.

1959: First graduates finish school.

1963–1973: The Agricultural Pre-school operates in the building.

1974–1975: The school becomes a Collective School of Communes with branches in: Żerniki, Lip, Brudzew, Jarantów and Piskory.

1982: Installation of central heating.

1984: Subsequent changes in the school's activity - the Collective Community School becomes the Primary School again.

1997: The commune council of Blizanów decides to establish a School Complex, which includes: Primary School and Public Local Kindergarten

1999: The School Complex in Janków Pierwszy grew by the Junior High School.

2001–2003: Modernization of the school, which included insulation, a new elevation of the building, replacement of windows and door carpentry, renovation inside the building.

2004–2005: Expansion of the school: modernization of central heating from coal to oil.

2006: Putting into use a full-size Junior High School with facilities.

2008: Putting into use a multi-purpose pitch with a tartan surface and parking for teachers and parents.

2009: Modernization of the school in the field of electrical installation replacement.

2010: Putting into use a multi-functional sports Complex with a tartan track and a long jump.
