= Bogusławice, Kalisz County =

Bogusławice
- Village
- Location within Poland
- Coordinates: 52°1′N 18°15′E
- Country: Poland
- Voivodeship: Greater Poland
- County: Kalisz
- Gmina: Mycielin
- Population: 249

Bogusławice [bɔɡuswaˈvit͡sɛ] is a village in the administrative district of Gmina Mycielin, within Kalisz County, Greater Poland Voivodeship, in west-central Poland.
