= Rychnów =

Rychnów may refer to the following places:

- Rychnów, Greater Poland Voivodeship (west-central Poland)
- Rychnów, Opole Voivodeship (south-west Poland)
- Rychnów, West Pomeranian Voivodeship (north-west Poland)
