= Kazala Stara =

- Village
- Location within Poland
- Coordinates: 51°57′0″N 18°16′37″E
- Country: Poland
- Voivodeship: Greater Poland
- County: Kalisz
- Gmina: Mycielin
- Population: 70

Kazala Stara [kaˈzala ˈstara] is a village in the administrative district of Gmina Mycielin, within Kalisz County, Greater Poland Voivodeship, in west-central Poland.
