= Blizanów Drugi =

- Village
- Location within Poland
- Coordinates: 51°54′13″N 18°0′36″E
- Country: Poland
- Voivodeship: Greater Poland
- County: Kalisz
- Gmina: Blizanów

Population
  - Total: 270

Blizanów Drugi [bliˈzanuf ˈdruɡi] is a village in the administrative district of Gmina Blizanów, within Kalisz County, Greater Poland Voivodeship, in west-central Poland.
