= Szadek, Gmina Blizanów =

Szadek
- Village
- Location within Poland
- Coordinates: 51°49′53″N 18°01′21″E
- Country: Poland
- Voivodeship: Greater Poland
- County: Kalisz
- Gmina: Blizanów

Szadek [ˈʂadɛk] is a village in the administrative district of Gmina Blizanów, within Kalisz County, Greater Poland Voivodeship, in west-central Poland.
