= Józefów, Gmina Lisków =

Józefów
- Village
- Location within Poland
- Coordinates: 51°50′45″N 18°27′11″E
- Country: Poland
- Voivodeship: Greater Poland
- County: Kalisz
- Gmina: Lisków

Józefów (Polish pronunciation: [juˈzɛfuf]) is a village in the administrative district of Gmina Lisków, within Kalisz County, Greater Poland Voivodeship, in west-central Poland.
