= Jaszczury =

- Village
- Location within Poland
- Coordinates: 51°52′40″N 18°14′17″E
- Country: Poland
- Voivodeship: Greater Poland
- County: Kalisz
- Gmina: Mycielin

Jaszczury [jaʂˈt͡ʂurɨ] is a village in the administrative district of Gmina Mycielin, within Kalisz County, Greater Poland Voivodeship, in west-central Poland.
