= Sobiesęki, Greater Poland Voivodeship =

Sobiesęki
- Village
- Location within Poland
- Coordinates: 51°37′N 18°20′E
- Country: Poland
- Voivodeship: Greater Poland
- County: Kalisz
- Gmina: Brzeziny

Sobiesęki [sɔbjɛˈsɛnki] is a village in the administrative district of Gmina Brzeziny, within Kalisz County, Greater Poland Voivodeship, in west-central Poland.
