= Bugaj, Kalisz County =

Bugaj
- Village
- Location within Poland
- Coordinates: 51°54′39.93″N 18°15′30.27″E
- Country: Poland
- Voivodeship: Greater Poland
- County: Kalisz
- Gmina: Mycielin

Bugaj [ˈbuɡai̯] is a village in the administrative district of Gmina Mycielin, within Kalisz County, Greater Poland Voivodeship, in west-central Poland.
