= Kukułka, Kalisz County =

Kukułka
- Settlement
- Location within Poland
- Coordinates: 51°53′24″N 18°12′34″E
- Country: Poland
- Voivodeship: Greater Poland
- County: Kalisz
- Gmina: Mycielin
- Population: 30

Kukułka [kuˈkuu̯ka] is a settlement in the administrative district of Gmina Mycielin, within Kalisz County, Greater Poland Voivodeship, in west-central Poland.
