= Lipe Trzecie =

- Village
- Location within Poland
- Coordinates: 51°56′12″N 18°1′19″E
- Country: Poland
- Voivodeship: Greater Poland
- County: Kalisz
- Gmina: Blizanów
- Population: 180

Lipe Trzecie [ˈlipɛ ˈtʂɛt͡ɕɛ] is a village in the administrative district of Gmina Blizanów, within Kalisz County, Greater Poland Voivodeship, in west-central Poland.
