= Lisków =

- Village
- Location within Poland
- Coordinates: 51°50′N 18°24′E
- Country: Poland
- Voivodeship: Greater Poland
- County: Kalisz
- Gmina: Lisków

Lisków [ˈliskuf] is a village in Kalisz County, Greater Poland Voivodeship, in west-central Poland. It is the seat of the gmina (administrative district) called Gmina Lisków.
