= Jamnice, Poland =

Jamnice
- Village
- Location within Poland
- Coordinates: 51°35′N 18°19′E
- Country: Poland
- Voivodeship: Greater Poland
- County: Kalisz
- Gmina: Brzeziny

Jamnice [jamˈnit͡sɛ] is a village in the administrative district of Gmina Brzeziny, within Kalisz County, Greater Poland Voivodeship, in west-central Poland.
