= Vindelev Hoard =

Iron Age objects found near Jelling, Denmark

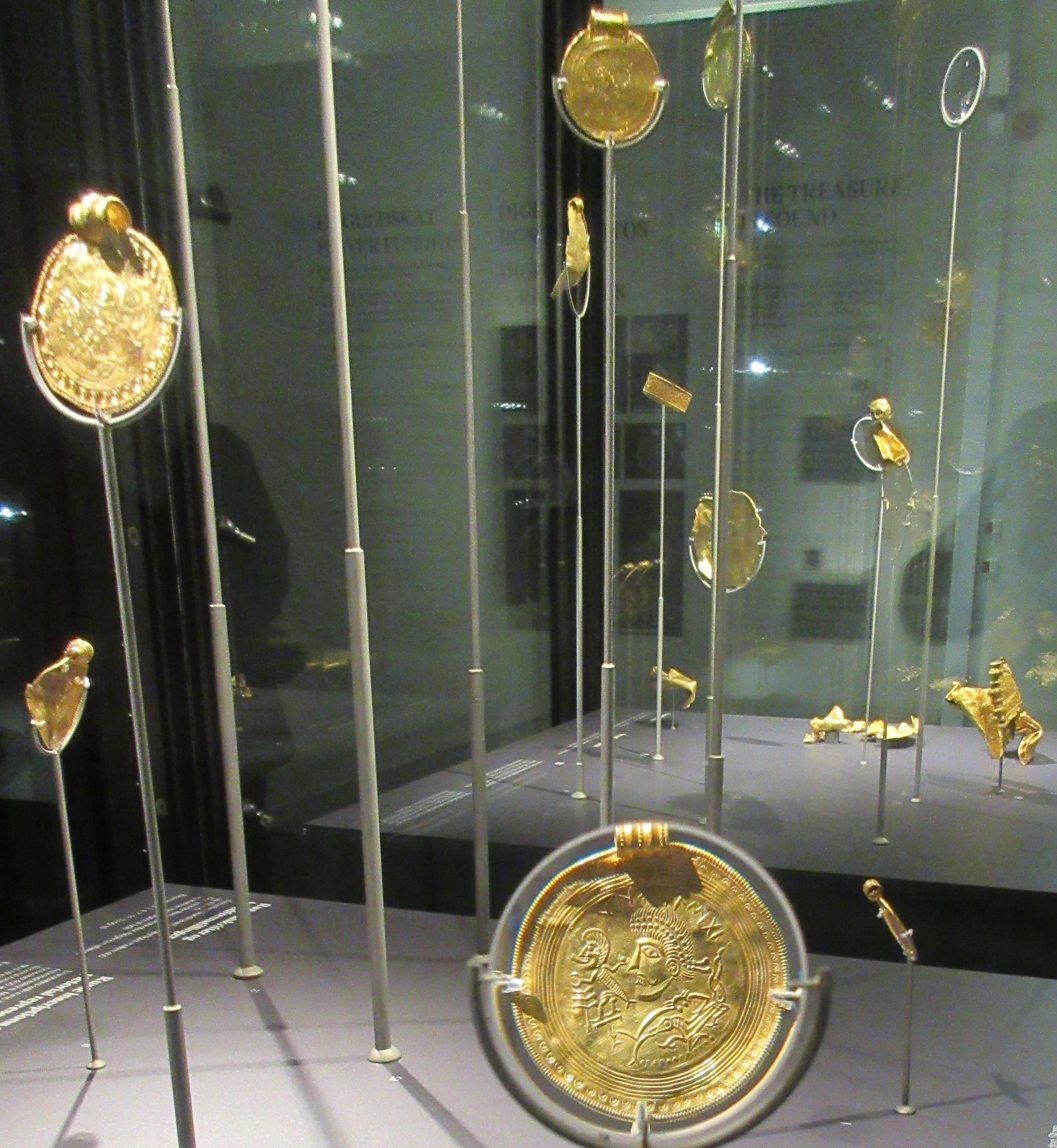
Exhibition of the treasure at Vejle Art Museum (2022)

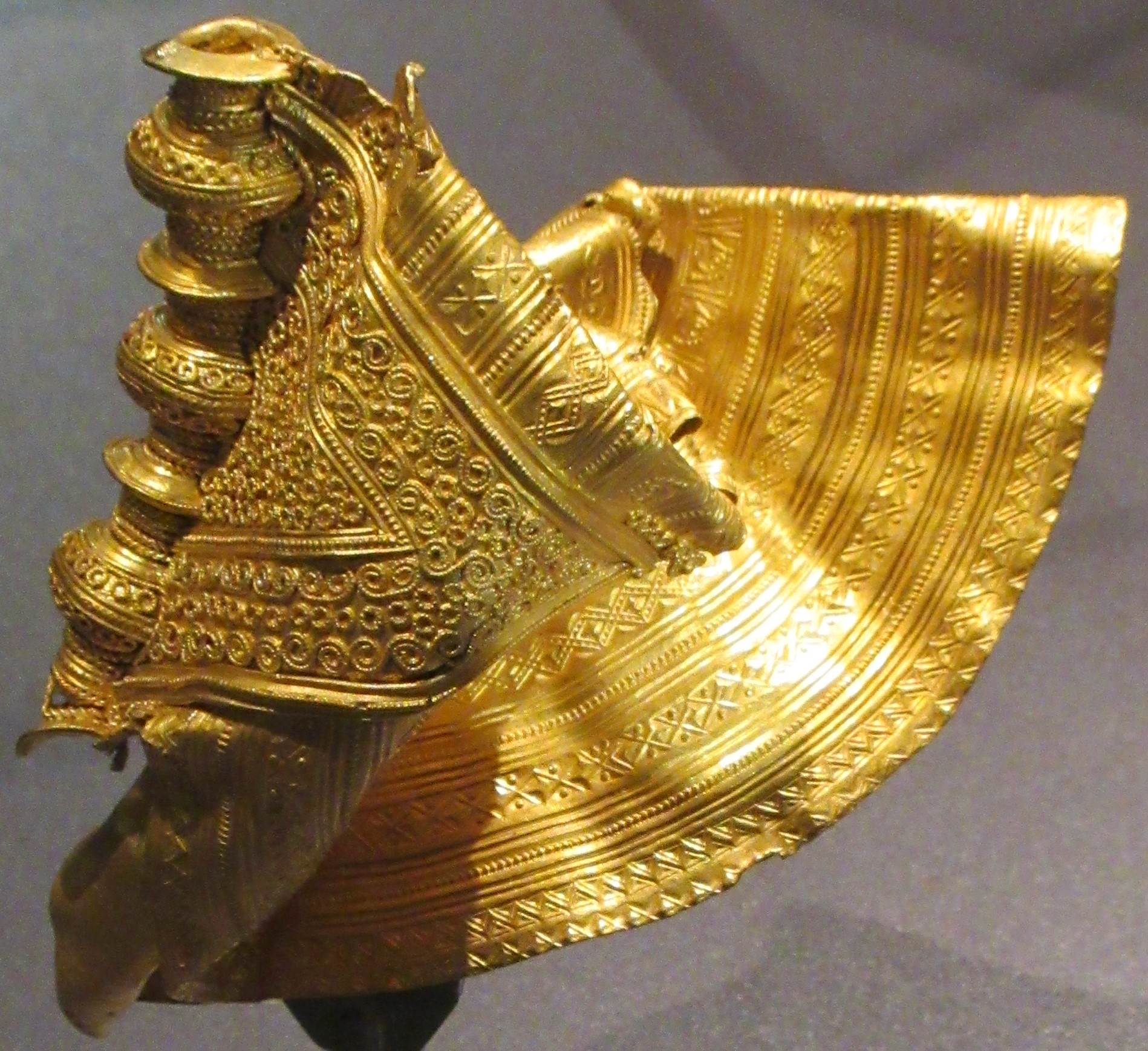
X10, the world's largest known gold bracteate

The Vindelev Hoard was discovered in 2020 in a field in Vindelev in Denmark, around eight kilometers northeast of Jelling in the east of Jutland. The hoard from the Germanic Iron Age consists of a total of 23 finds from the Migration Period between the 5th and 6th centuries. These include four Roman coins, sixteen medals stamped on one side from sheet gold, bracteates, some of which are unusually large with a diameter of almost 14 cm, and the golden fittings of a sword scabbard. The finds are significant not only because of their size and high quality workmanship, but also because they may be the earliest known mention of the Norse god Odin.

== Discovery ==
The treasure was found in December 2020 by prospector Ole Ginnerup Schytz in a field in Vindelev, about eight kilometers northeast of Jelling in the Danish region of Jutland. The pieces were only about ten centimetres (3.9 in) below the surface, i.e. in the plough layer. Nevertheless, the majority of the finds were located within two areas only four metres (13 ft) apart, so it can be assumed that the find site was close to the dumping site. Only three particularly large gold discs had been transported further by plowing and damaged in the process. One bracteate had been torn into three pieces (X12, X20 and X22), which were found 90 metres (300 ft) apart. The total weight of the recovered and cleaned objects was 794 grams (1.750 lb). The ensemble is of exceptional archaeological importance. The bracteates from Vindelev are unusually large, and their craftsmanship is of a very high quality.

During a follow-up excavation in March 2021, a gilded piece of hardware was found at some distance from the previous finds, which was assigned to the Nydam style. Excavations at the site of the find by archaeologists from the Vejlemuseum in late summer 2021 brought to light pottery shards, some glass fragments, remains of silver fibulae and around 840 postholes, which can be assigned to several buildings. Examination of the soil adhering to the finds and the postholes using radiocarbon dating revealed that both dated to the same period, indicating that the treasure was located within a northwest–southeast oriented longhouse surrounded by other, smaller houses. According to archaeologists, this was a princely residence with the hall of the prince in the middle.

== Description ==
The treasure contains a total of 23 finds, which are labeled X1 to X23 in the literature. In addition to four Roman coins and sixteen gold bracteates (a type of flat, thin, single-sided gold medal worn as jewelry), some of which are unusually large with a diameter of almost 14 centimetres (5.5 in), the gold fittings of a scabbard were also found. The bracteates and the Roman solidi each have a decorative edge and in some cases magnificently decorated eyelets so that they could be used as pendants.

Nine of the bracteates are A-type bracteates, which show one or, more rarely, two male busts in profile. Five bracteates (X4, X7, X11, X13 and X17) belong to the C-type, in which a horse and sometimes other animals or figures are depicted next to or below the male bust. Most of the bracteates have runic inscriptions, although these have only been partially interpreted to date.

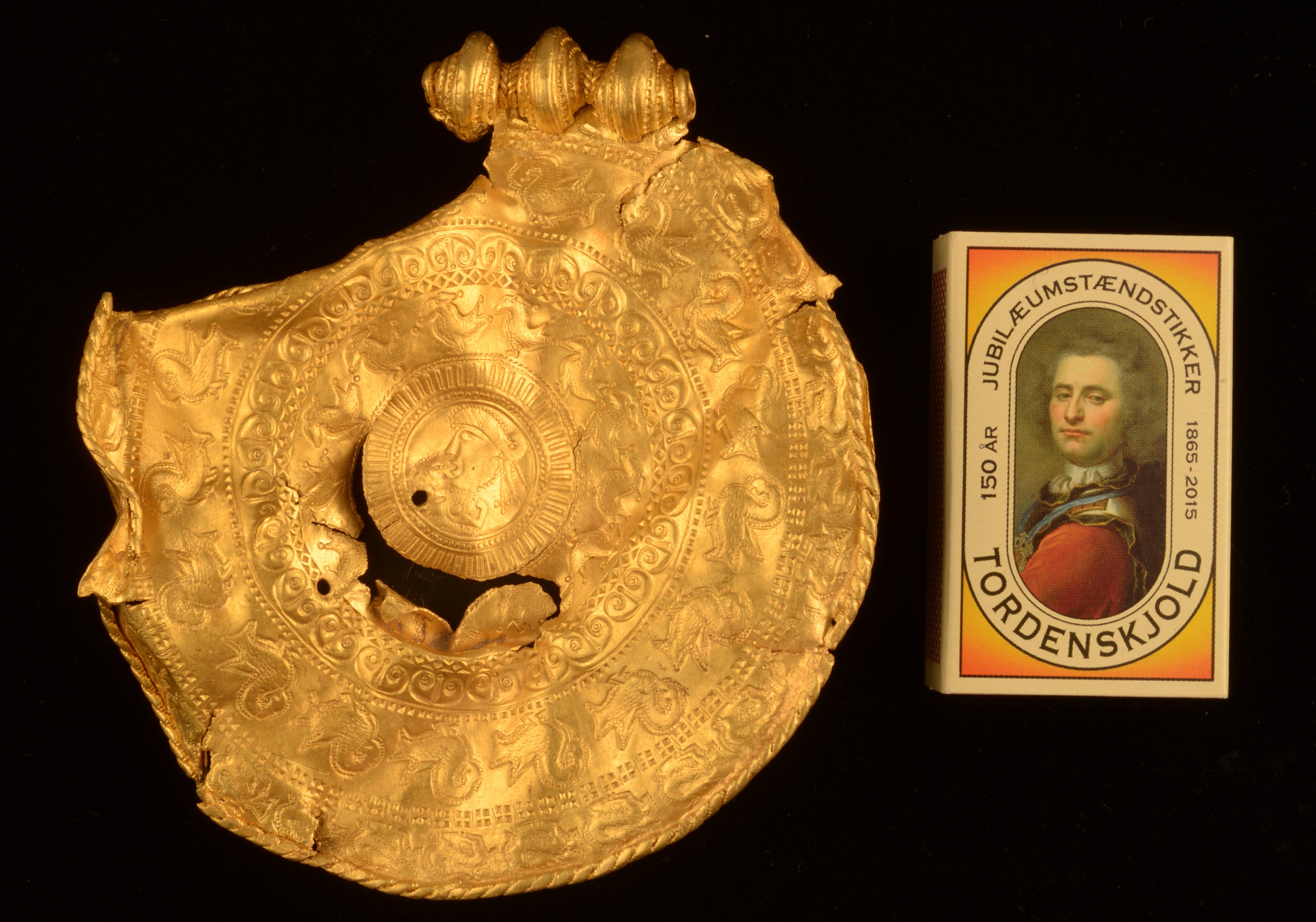
Bracteate X9, 10.3 centimetres (4.1 in) in size, with matchbox for size comparison; the two holes were used to attach a fitting to repair the crack that had already appeared during the period of use.

The bracteates are exceptionally large. Together, the thirteen pieces weigh 576 grams (1.270 lb), as much as a hundred bracteates from earlier finds. At almost 14 centimetres (5.5 in) in diameter, X10 is the largest known bracteate and four more of the Vindelever bracteates, X17, X20, X9 and X19, are among the ten largest specimens ever found. The central images, which have the same diameter of around 3 centimetres (1.2 in) as previously known comparable pieces, are often surrounded by several concentric rows of stamped, sometimes figurative decorations. The eyelets are also consistently more splendid and produced with more elaborate goldsmithing than on almost all other comparable pieces found to date.

The damage to some of the finds is due to the fact that the deposition site was later ploughed, crushing the thin gold discs lying just below the surface. The largest bracteates, on the other hand, had been rolled up or folded before deposition. Unprofessional repairs, some with soldered patches, some with riveted fittings, on several bracteates indicate damage during the period of use.

To avoid having to unfold the bracteates, they were scanned at the 3D Imaging Center of Danmarks Tekniske Universitet using computer tomography and the resulting data was used to digitally unfold and make them legible.

=== Roman coins ===
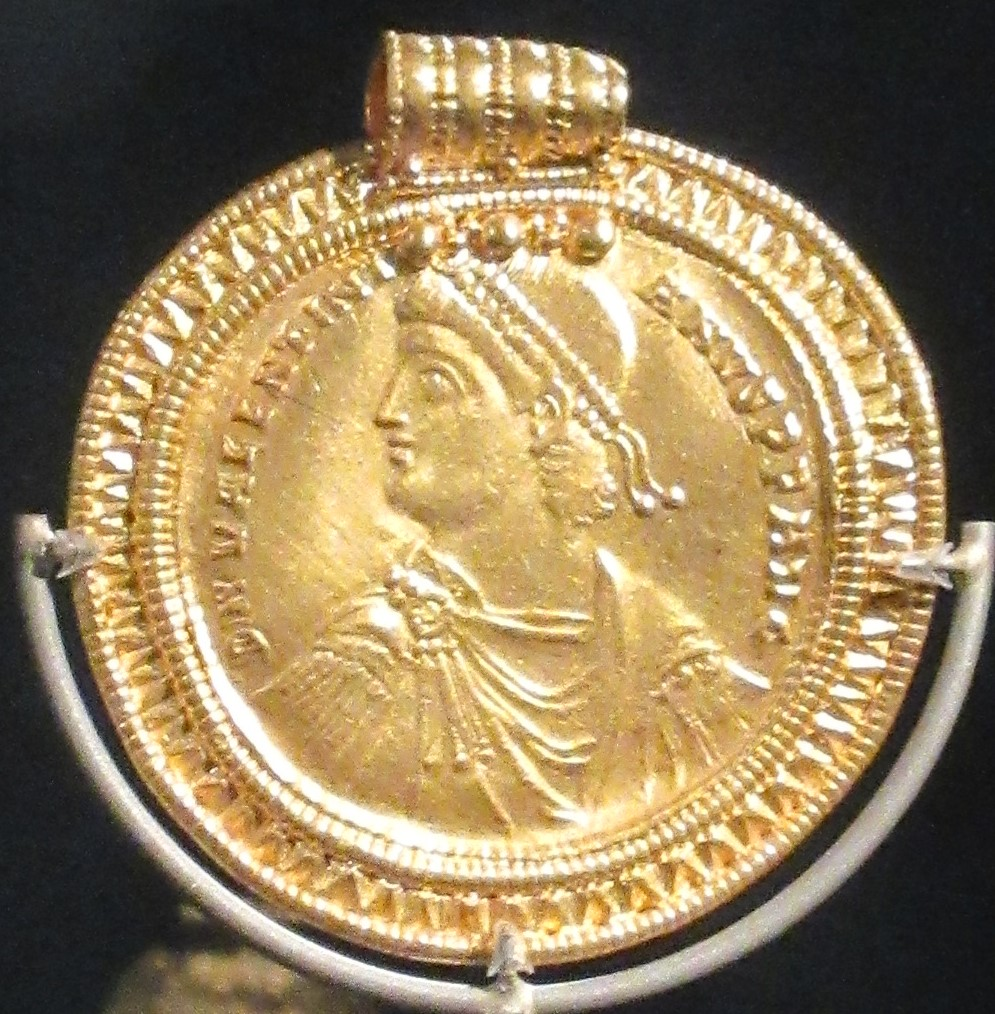
Solidus of Valentinian reworked into a medallion (X15)

The four Roman coins show the emperors Constantine I (306–337, X5), Constans (337–350, X6), Valentinian I (364–375, X15) and Gratian (375–384, X2). The solidus of Constans in particular is heavily worn, which indicates that the coins were used for a longer period of time before being reworked into a medallion. The coins of Constantine, Constans, and Gratian were minted in Trier, while those of Valentinian were minted in Thessaloniki. All four coins were framed with a decorative edge and fitted with eyelets so that they could be worn as pendants. The use of Roman coins as pendants is also known from other finds, such as the Brangstrup hoard with a total of 48 Roman gold coins, several of which had been pierced and presumably served as necklaces. What is special about the Vindelev hoard is that, for the first time in Scandinavia, it contained several Roman coins that had been artfully reworked into a pendant. It is also the first find in which Roman gold coins and bracteates reworked into pendants were found at the same site.

In 2024, the archaeologist Helle Horsnæs discovered that the decorative loop of the Valentinian solidus (X15) is almost identical to that of a stem-identical coin of Valentinian, also reworked, which belongs to a hoard of Roman coins, jewelry and some bracteates found in Zagorzyn (near Kalisz) in Poland. She concluded that both coins were reworked into pendants in the same workshop outside the Roman Empire.

=== Houaʀ-Bracteate ===
The central image of bracteate X4 shows a long-haired man with a tiara and neck ring reminiscent of the Roman imperial crown, a four-legged animal, presumably a horse, with semicircular antlers or horns and decorated bands around its neck and belly, and a bird with a curved beak. This form of bracteate belongs to the C2 family of forms.

An inscription in the Elder Futhark in the Proto-Norse language runs along the edge. The inscription possibly contains early evidence of Norse mythology: the word in front of the horse's head is transcribed by some researchers as houaʀ (= the high one) or houaz. The different transcription is due to the sound shift of the rune ᛉ from z to an /r/ sound, which, in contrast to ᚱ, r, is transcribed as small capitals. The interpretation as "the high one" possibly refers to Odin, who was given this epithet in later centuries. This could support Karl Hauck's theory that the crowned men on the bracteates represent gods, particularly Odin.

The runologist Lisbeth Imer and the linguist Krister Vasshus, on the other hand, interpret these runes as horaz, which means beloved, and could also refer to a person or a horse. The equivalent transcription horaʀ was already proposed in 2001 for a very similar specimen from a find on Funen. This bracteate, discovered as early as 1689, is referred to in research as IK 58 (or DR BR42) and shows an almost identical central image and the same runes.

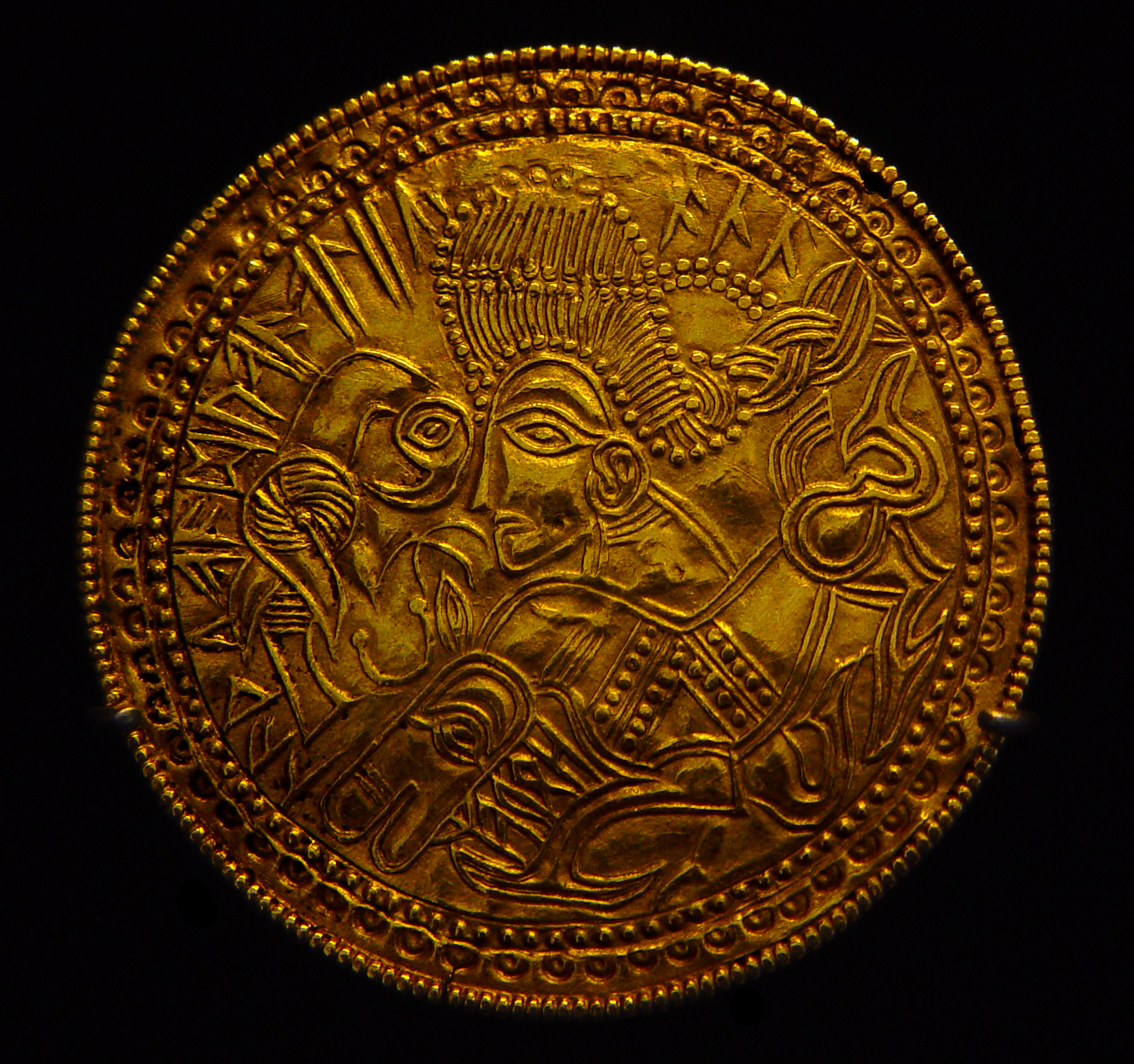
IK 58 (DR BR42), found before 1689 on Funen, is a parallel piece to X4

Two further words are read as the formulaic word alu and laþu, "invitation" or, according to Hauck, "citation" in the sense of summoning a deity, and possibly refer to a fertility ritual. The other runes do not produce any meaningful words; they are possibly magical word formations.

The lost Vadstena bracteate and the bracteate IK 377.2 found in Mariedam, which is identical to it, also have the same combination of images, although the Mariedam bracteate contains no text, while the runic text of the Vadstena bracteate, which is separated from the central image by a ring, cannot be deciphered and is regarded as a letter and alphabet spell.

=== Wodan/Odin inscription ===
The bracteate X13, which belongs to the C3 type, shows a swastika and an open neck ring next to the head depicted in profile with a tiara and long braid. A horse is depicted below the head. A bracteate cataloged as IK 31 Bolbro (II)-C from a hoard found in 1852 in Bolbro on the outskirts of Odense was made with the same mold, but its runic inscription surrounding the depiction is illegible.

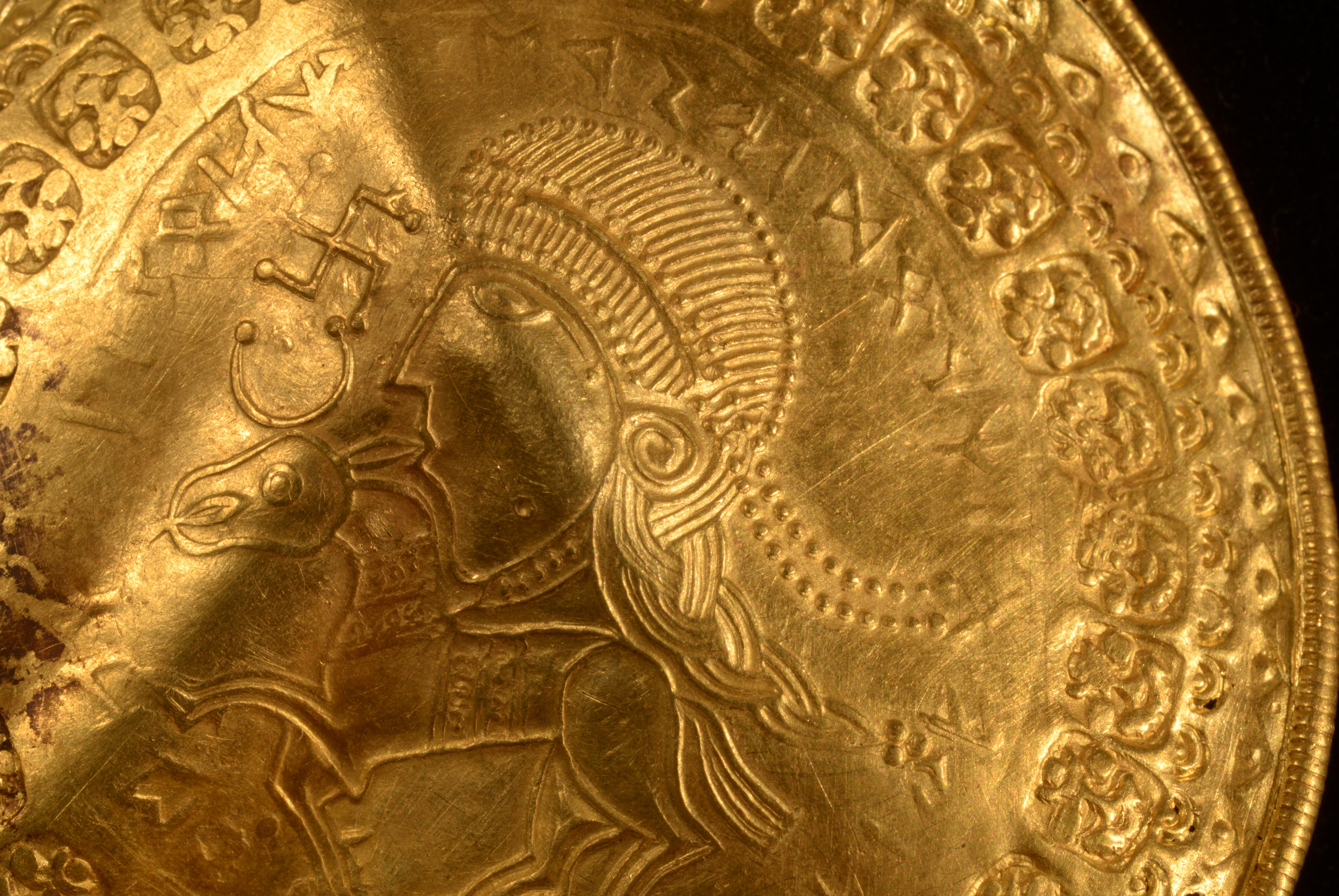
Detail of X13 with head, horse, torques, runic inscription, and swastika

Imer and Vasshus deciphered the text in 2023. According to this, the Norse text begins with the word hostiōz, a loanword from the Latin hostia, which can be interpreted as a sacrificial animal. The following runic sequences are related to hunting, which means that the depiction could be interpreted as a hunting scene.

Imer and Vasshus read the last part of the inscription as iz Wōd[a]nas weraz ("He is Wodan/Odin's man"). According to Imer, this is the oldest mention of the god Wodan/Odin and before the inscription on the Nordendorf I fibula, which dates to the 6th century. The name of the person referred to as "Wodan/Odin's man" is read as "Jaga(z)". Imer and Vasshus see this as evidence that the people depicted on the bracteates are humans and not gods. This interpretation contradicts Hauck's interpretation, which is widely accepted by researchers, who saw in the depiction of man and horse on the C-bracteates the healing of the Balder foal by Odin described in the Second Merseburg Charm.

=== Bracteates with twin heads ===
At 123.7 grams (4.36 oz) and a diameter of 13.8 centimetres (5.4 in), the disc marked X10 is the world's largest gold bracteate found to date. The pendant and eyelet are artistically designed in filigree work. As the thin gold disc is rolled up and crushed, the motif in the middle, presumably two men's heads, is not fully visible. Ornaments and small heads applied with stamps are arranged in several concentric rows around the center.

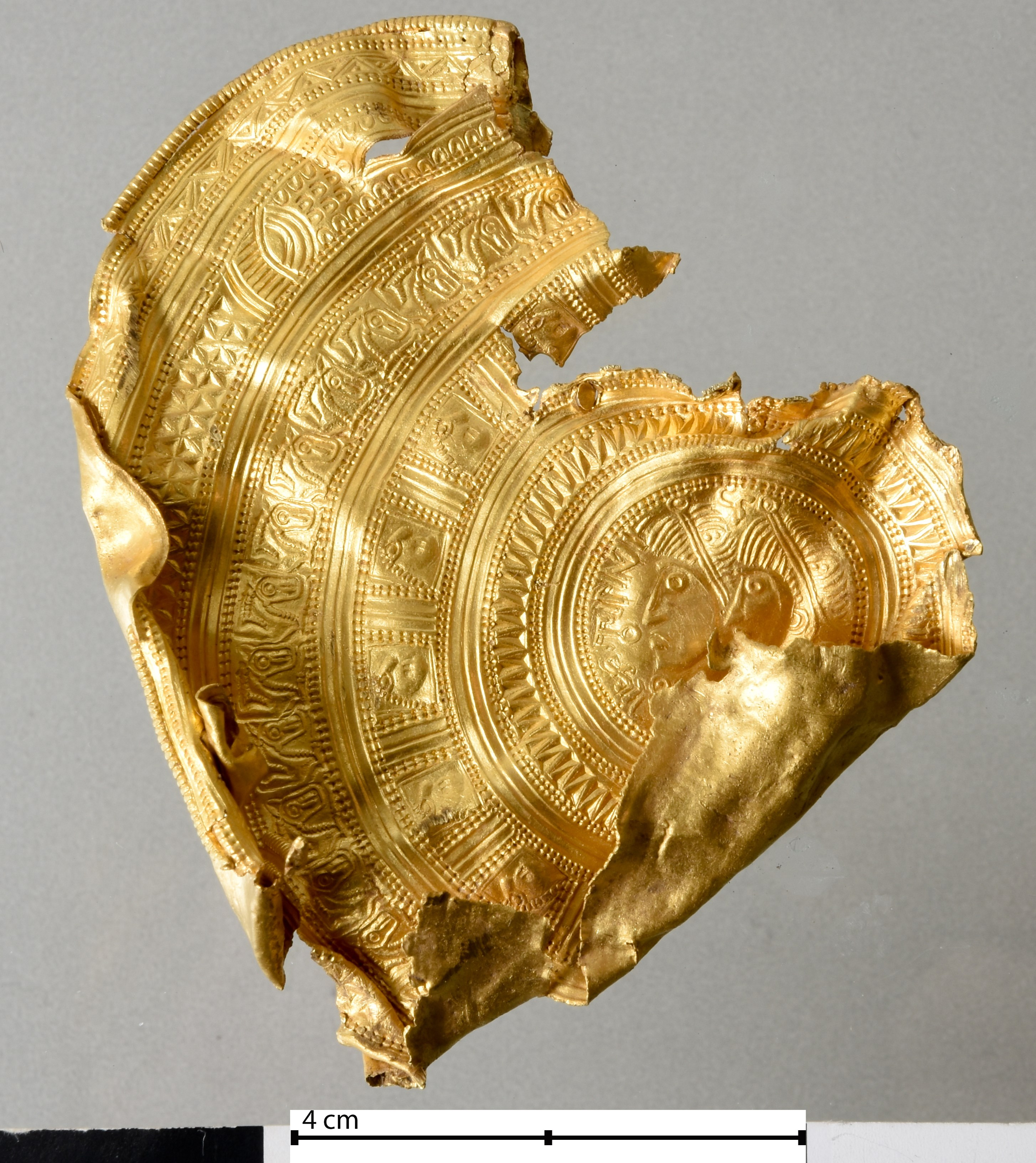
Bracteate X20

The bracteate X20 (+ X12 + X22), broken into three pieces and measuring 11.4 centimetres (4.5 in) in diameter and weighing a total of 74.83 grams (2.640 oz), shows a similar motif and is also of impressive size. The central image shows two identical busts in profile, adorned with a tiara, looking in the same direction and wearing cloaks held together by fibulae on one shoulder. A triskelion floats between their heads. The center of X20 is also surrounded by several concentric rows of stamped ornaments, including a row of horse heads and a snake.

Similar bracteates with twin heads and triskele are known from Gudme, where they are dated to the 5th century. Researchers classify them as A4 bracteates. Whether they are twin deities or royal brothers, as mentioned by ancient and early medieval writers for various Germanic peoples, has not yet been clarified. The horse heads on X20 could refer to horse deities such as the Dioscuri.

=== Further A bracteates ===
On X9, an A bracteate, the crowned man appears to be wearing chain mail, holding a globe in one hand and a drinking horn decorated with pearls in the other. This is the first known depiction of a drinking horn on a bracteate in Scandinavia. This depiction is surrounded by several rows of stamped ornaments in the central field of the bracteate, including two rows with stylized depictions of birds and one with a four-legged animal. This very large bracteate is heavily worn and was repaired before being deposited; the fitting, which was torn off when the medallion was damaged by plowing in modern times, was also found.

X1 and the two stem-identical bracteates X3 and X14 also show the crowned person in unusual clothing. The person on X1 wears the embroidered robe of a consul and holds a globe in his hand as a symbol of rulership. The similarity to the depiction of Roman rulers is particularly striking here. The clothing on X3 and X14 could represent armor. The figure holds a knotted ring in his right hand and a globe in his left. The border decoration of X14, consisting of several rows of stamped motifs, shows, among other things, a row of masked heads and a row of swimming birds, presumably ducks.

The person depicted on the bracteate X19, which has a particularly ornate frame, wears a cloak fastened to one shoulder. Although she is holding a sceptre in one hand, the hands raised to the sky are atypical for depictions of rulers or gods.

=== Further C-bracteates ===
X7 shows a man with a Roman imperial diadem and an open neck ring reminiscent of a torque and a twirled moustache. One of his hands rests on the back of a horse with a serpent's tongue, while in the other hand he holds a kind of sceptre, on which a warrior figure with a fish-like torso stands as if on a pedestal, carrying an open ring in one hand, which can be interpreted as a torque or a laurel wreath, and in the other a sphere, which is probably to be regarded as an insignia of power corresponding to the imperial orb. The stylized tree next to the warrior figure is reminiscent of the world tree Yggdrasil, which, however, only appears in written sources several centuries later. The runic inscription has not yet been interpreted. A bracteate (IK 691) with a similar depiction was found in Kristianslund in Skovby Sogn on Funen.

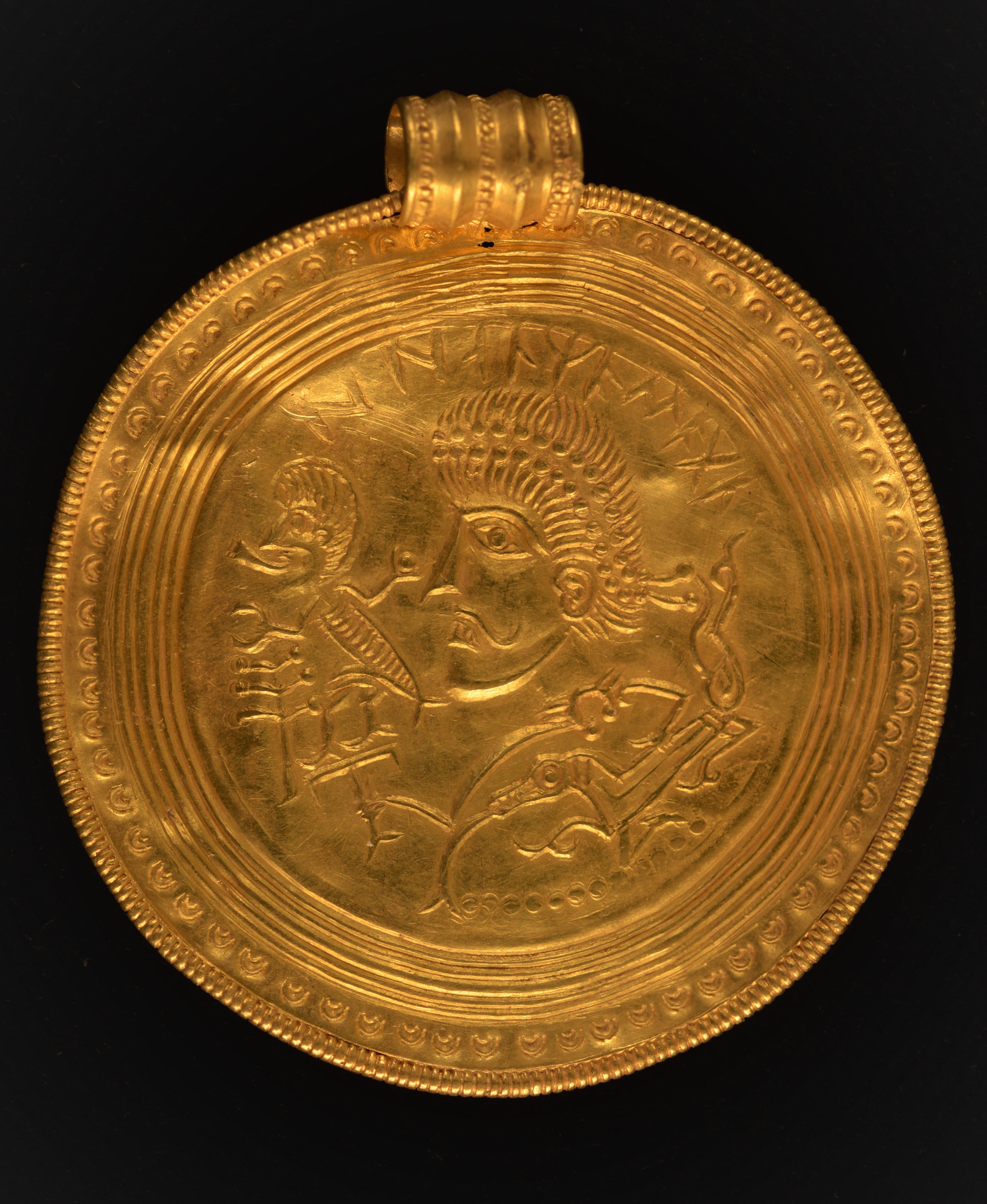
Bracteate X7

The two remaining C bracteates are similar in motif to X4 and X13 described above. The face on X11 looks to the right, unlike on the other bracteates. The runic inscription is separated from the figurative depiction by a band. As with X13 with the Odin inscription, a stem-identical piece of X11 was also found at Bolbro near Odense. With a diameter of 11.8 centimetres (4.6 in), the similarly designed X17 is the second largest bracteate of the Vindelev Hoard and the third largest ever found and was folded before being deposited.

=== Further finds ===
The approximately six centimetres (2.4 in) wide mouthpiece of a sword scabbard (X18) is undamaged. It is just as highly crafted as the other finds. Morten Axboe dates it to the beginning of the 6th century as the youngest piece in the treasure. In his opinion, the filigree weave pattern conceals animal heads.

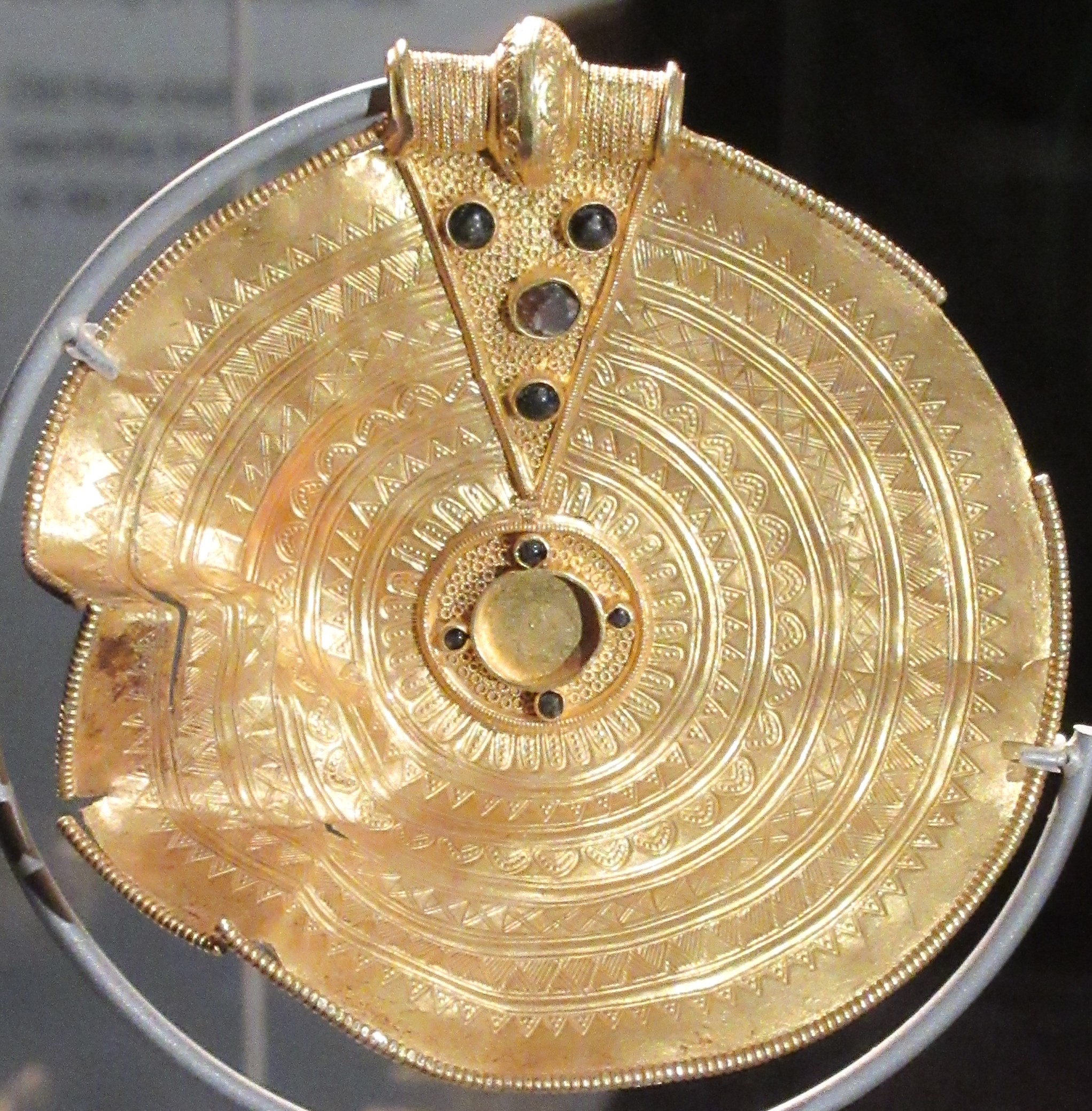
Gold medallion X8 with glass inlay

One particularly large medallion (X8) does not contain a picture in the center, but rather a setting whose inlay is missing. It is decorated with colored glass inlays in the middle and on the triangular pendant, which extends almost to the central field.

== Historical classification ==
=== Dating and deposition ===
The archaeologist Morten Axboe describes the find as equivalent to the Golden Horns of Gallehus. He dates the date of manufacture of the bracteates from the Vindelever find to the second half of the 5th century, i.e. the middle of the Migration Period. This makes them older than comparable bracteates from other gold finds.

It is unknown why the gold was buried. The location of the find within a longhouse, which is believed to have been a princely residence, suggests that it was hidden during times of war. However, the symmetrical folding of several large bracteates before burial suggests a ritual deposition. In addition to the Vindelev hoard, other hoards dating from a similar period are known such as the bracteates from Nebenstedt or the Hjarnø gold hoard found near Horsens in 2016. A theory put forward by Morten Axboe and others attributes the accumulation of hoards in the 6th century to the climate anomaly of 536–550, when volcanic eruptions around 536 led to a sharp drop in temperatures and, as a result, crop failures, famines, and outbreaks of disease. This sudden, multi-year cold spell, which claimed the lives of a large part of the Scandinavian population, is in turn associated with the mythological Fimbulwinter, the beginning of Ragnarök, the downfall of the gods. Among other things, it is believed that during this period, people made more sacrifices to the gods for better weather.

=== Location ===
The site is located around 300 metres (980 ft) south-east of the Romanesque fieldstone church of Vindelev, which was built in the 12th century. The ending -lev, meaning "inheritance," of the place name suggests that the village was founded in the 4th or 5th century. The name component vinde- could come from a personal name, Vindi. It may also refer to a winding stream or path. This could either refer to the small stream flowing past the site or the path to Jelling, which runs between wetlands and over the hill on which the church built in the 12th century stands.

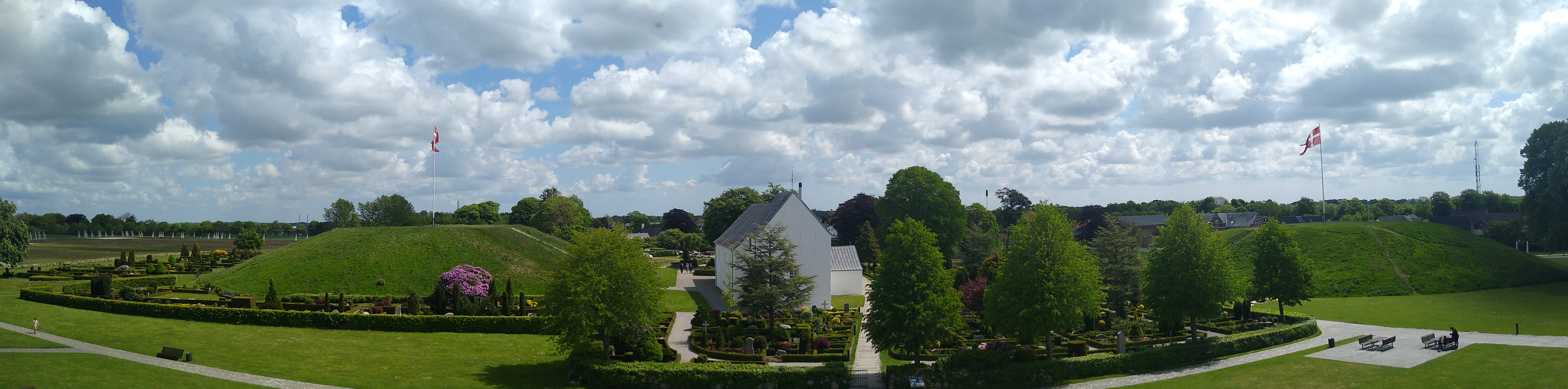
Jelling, the 11th-century church between the two hills, with the reconstructed palisades of the royal residence in the background on the left

About 500 metres (1,600 ft) from the site was a burial mound that had already been ploughed over at the beginning of the 20th century, from which fragments of urns with the remains of cremated bones and a bone comb had been recovered in 1861.

As the site is only Peight kilometres (5.0 mi) away from Jelling, which was the burial place of Gorm the Old and the royal residence of his son Harald Bluetooth in the 10th century, Mads Kähler Holst suggests that there was already a royal seat in this area.

=== Social context ===
The size and quality of the finds suggest that the owner was a very high-ranking person. According to Mads Ravn, the amount of gold indicates "a very powerful, but previously unknown clan leader". The similarity to parallel pieces found in Gudme also suggests that at least some of the bracteates were made on Funen and came to Vindelev as a gift or exchange. This in turn suggests a "close connection—perhaps an alliance—between the clan leaders of the two centers of power."

Helle Horsnæs, who examined the four Roman solidi, sees the existence of a parallel piece to X15 found in the south of present-day Poland as an indication that the pendants made from Roman gold coins changed hands several times on their way to Vindelev. In the Roman Empire, such medallions served as honorary gifts to deserving politicians and military personnel. Horsnæs assumes "that the medallions most likely functioned as bride payments / gifts in a network of important personalities in the non-Roman part of Europe". In her opinion, the owner of the solidi and bracteates was not just a local leader, but part of a culturally and politically networked "continental elite."

== Cultural classification ==
What is conspicuous about the Vindelev Hoard, apart from its size and elaborate decoration, is that type A bracteates are in the majority here, while type C is the most common in previous finds. Type D bracteates, which depict several animals but no human figures, are completely absent, although they are otherwise widespread in Jutland. Kent Otte Laursen of the Vejlemuseum sees this as an indication of the early dating of the Vindelev Treasure, as the D-type is considered to be the youngest style of bracteate. Bracteates of the A-type in particular, with the depiction of a crowned head in profile, were obviously intended to imitate Roman coins. As with other bracteates found earlier, some of the runic inscriptions are pure imitations of the characters on the Roman coins, while others can be interpreted as spells or references to Germanic mythology.

After research had previously followed Hauck's assumption that gods were depicted on the bracteates, Imer and Vasshus, based on the interpretation of the inscription iz Wōd[a]nas weraz ("He is Wodan/Odin's man") on X13, put forward the thesis that the heads on the bracteates represent chieftains or kings. Similarities with comparable finds suggest cultural and political connections to other parts of Denmark, especially to Funen and Scania. Some of the Vindelev bracteates even have identically stamped counterparts. The runologist Lisbeth Imer assumes that this type of jewelry was given as gifts to alliance partners and that an alliance was expressed by wearing similar medallions. Written evidence for this theory can be found in Saxo Grammaticus, who reports that the legendary King Frode had a gold chain with medallions depicting royal images, which he gave as a reward for loyal service. According to Horsnæs, this custom could have been adopted by the Romans along with the solidi, which were fashioned into jewelry pendants.

== Exhibition ==
In 2022, the treasure was exhibited in the exhibition Magt og guld - Vikinger i øst at the Vejle Cultural Museum and until February 2024 at the National Museum of Denmark in Copenhagen. From May 2025, it will be on display in the permanent exhibition at the Museum Kongernes Jelling, just a few kilometers from where it was found.
