= Gmina Blizanów =

Gmina Blizanów Blizanów Commune
- Gmina
- Coat of arms

- Coordinates (Blizanów): 51°54′N 18°1′E
- Country: Poland
- Voivodeship: Greater Poland
- County: Kalisz County
- Seat: Blizanów

Area
  - Total: 157.82 km^{2} (60.93 sq mi)

Population (2006)
  - Total: 9,251
  - Density: 58.62/km^{2} (151.8/sq mi)
- Website: http://ug-blizanow.everest-pi.com.pl/

Gmina Blizanów is a rural gmina (administrative district) in Kalisz County, Greater Poland Voivodeship, in west-central Poland. Its seat is the village of Blizanów, which lies approximately 17 kilometres (11 mi) north of Kalisz and 94 km (58 mi) south-east of the regional capital Poznań.

The gmina covers an area of 157.82 square kilometres (60.9 sq mi) and had a total population of 9,251 as of 2006.

== Villages ==
Gmina Blizanów contains the villages and settlements of Biskupice, Blizanów, Blizanów Drugi, Blizanówek, Bogucice, Bolmów, Brudzew, Brzezina, Czajków, Czajków-Kolonia, Dębniałki, Dębniałki Kaliskie, Dojutrów, Godziątków, Grodzisk, Janków Drugi, Janków Pierwszy, Janków Trzeci, Jarantów, Jarantów-Kolonia, Jastrzębniki, Korab, Kurza, Łaszków, Łaszków-Kolonia, Lipe, Lipe Trzecie, Pamięcin, Pawłówek, Piotrów, Piskory, Poklęków, Pruszków, Romanki, Rosocha, Rychnów, Rychnów-Kolonia, Skrajnia, Skrajnia Blizanowska, Szadek, Szadek-Kolonia, Warszówka, Wyganki, Zagorzyn, Żegocin and Żerniki.

== Neighbouring gminas ==
Gmina Blizanów is bordered by the city of Kalisz and by the gminas of Chocz, Gołuchów, Grodziec, Pleszew, Stawiszyn and Żelazków.
