= Korab, Greater Poland Voivodeship =

Korab
- Village
- Location within Poland
- Coordinates: 51°56′14″N 17°58′36″E
- Country: Poland
- Voivodeship: Greater Poland
- County: Kalisz
- Gmina: Blizanów
- Population: 270

Korab [ˈkɔrap] is a village in the administrative district of Gmina Blizanów, within Kalisz County, Greater Poland Voivodeship, in west-central Poland.
