= Pamięcin, Greater Poland Voivodeship =

Pamięcin
- Village
- Location within Poland
- Coordinates: 51°49′58″N 18°3′51″E
- Country: Poland
- Voivodeship: Greater Poland
- County: Kalisz
- Gmina: Blizanów

Pamięcin [paˈmjɛnt͡ɕin] is a village in the administrative district of Gmina Blizanów, in Kalisz County, Greater Poland Voivodeship in west-central Poland.
