= Mycielin, Kalisz County =

Mycielin
- Village
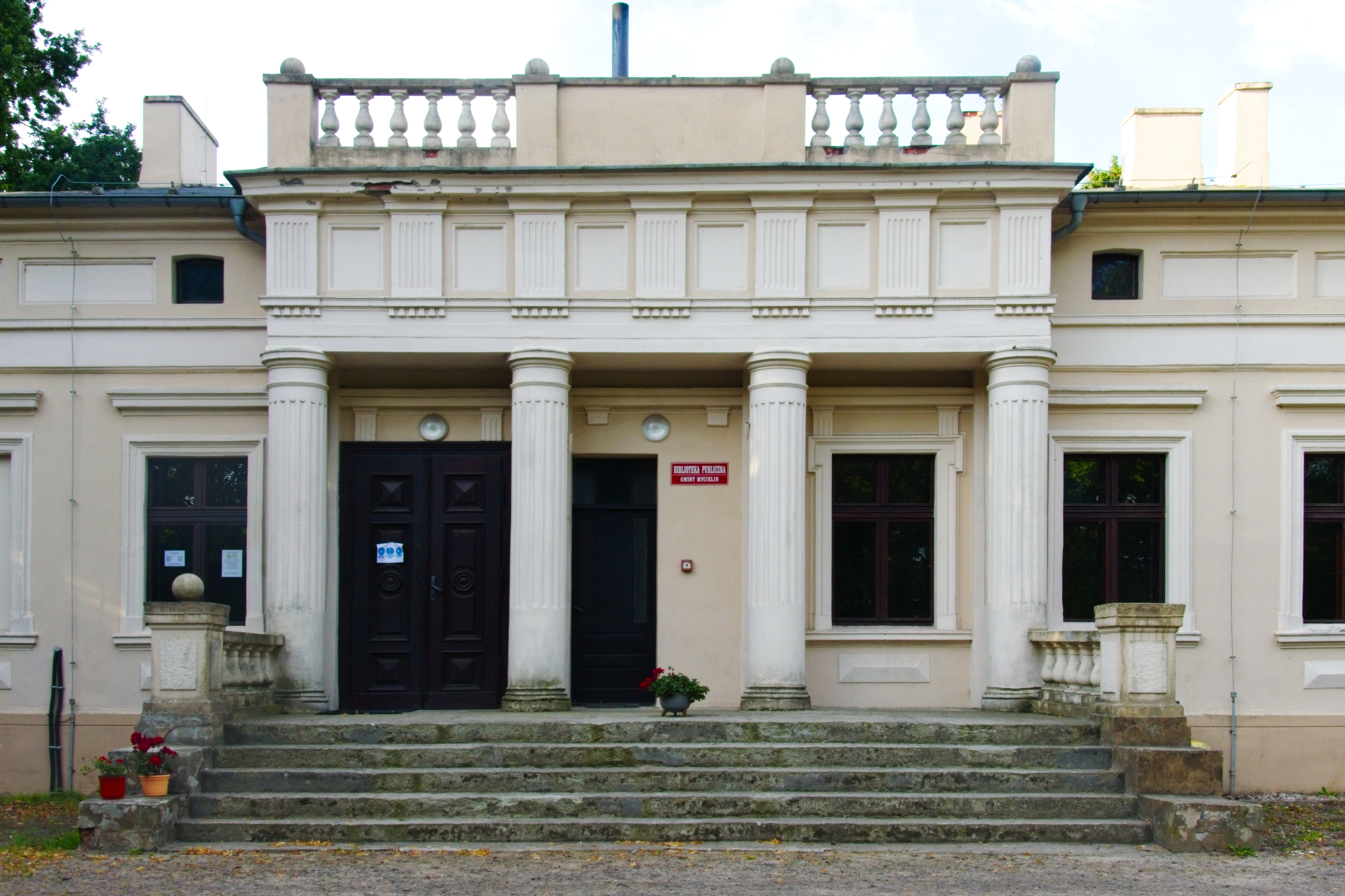
- Mycielin Public Library, formerly an elementary school and even earlier a former manor house building.

- Location within Poland
- Coordinates: 51°58′N 18°15′E
- Country: Poland
- Voivodeship: Greater Poland
- County: Kalisz
- Gmina: Mycielin
- Population: 485
- Postal code: 62-831
- Website: https://bip.mycielin.pl/

Mycielin [mɨˈt͡ɕɛlin] (1940-1945 German: Mützlin) a village in the administrative district of Gmina Mycielin, within Kalisz County, Greater Poland Voivodeship, in west-central Poland.
