= Blizanów =

- Village
- Location within Poland
- Coordinates: 51°54′N 18°1′E
- Country: Poland
- Voivodeship: Greater Poland
- County: Kalisz
- Gmina: Blizanów
- Website: https://www.blizanow.ug.gov.pl

Blizanów [bliˈzanuf] is a village in Kalisz County, Greater Poland Voivodeship, in west-central Poland. It is the seat of the gmina (administrative district) called Gmina Blizanów.
