= Czajków, Kalisz County =

Czajków
- Village
- Location within Poland
- Coordinates: 51°49′20″N 18°04′36″E
- Country: Poland
- Voivodeship: Greater Poland
- County: Kalisz
- Gmina: Blizanów
- Population: about 180
- Time zone: UTC+1 (CET)
  - Summer (DST): UTC+2 (CEST)
- Vehicle registration: PKA

Czajków [ˈt͡ʂai̯kuf] is a village in the administrative district of Gmina Blizanów, within Kalisz County, Greater Poland Voivodeship, in central Poland.

== History ==
During the German occupation of Poland (World War II), in 1942, the occupiers carried out expulsions of Poles, who were deported to forced labour in Germany and German-annexed Austria, while their houses and farms were handed over to German colonists as part of the Lebensraum policy.
