= Słuszków Hoard =

Medieval treasure hoard found in the village of Słuszków in Poland

- Skarb ze Słuszkowa
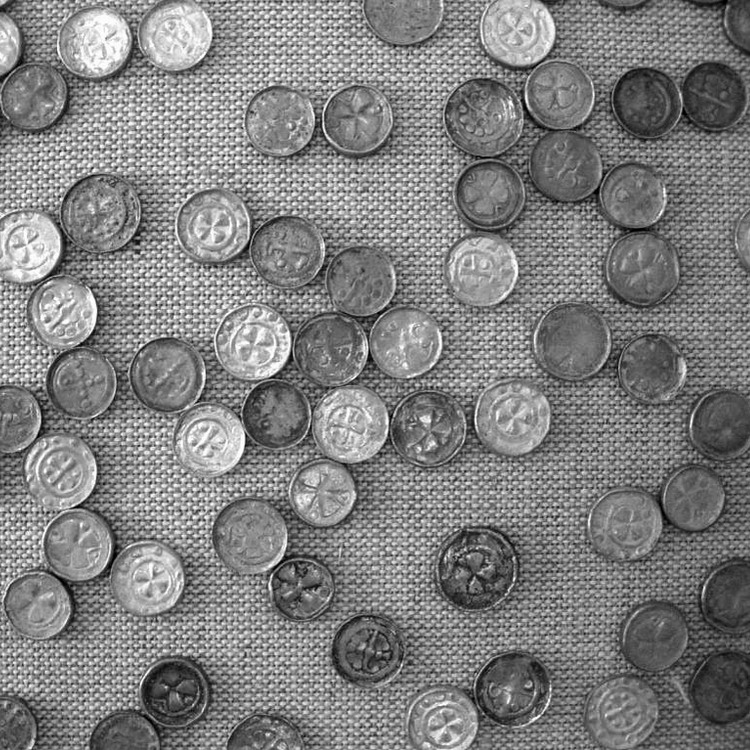
- Part of the Treasure of Słuszków
- Created: c. 1100 (deposited)
- Period/culture: Middle Ages
- Discovered: 1935; Słuszków, Poland
- Present location: District Museum of Kalisz Land in Kalisz, Poland

The Słuszków Hoard (Polish: skarb ze Słuszkowa) is a treasure hoard that was found in the village of Słuszków, located in the historical area known as Kalisz Land and presently situated in the Greater Poland Voivodeship. The treasure was buried around the year 1100 and was uncovered in 1935. Since 1958, it has been a part of the collection of the Kalisz Land Regional Museum. The hoard includes the largest collection of medieval silver coins in Poland, as well as the largest collection in the world of the so-called "cross denarii" or "cross pennies" (known in German as Radenpfennig).

The hoard contains 13,061 items. Among them are 12,500 cross denarii, early medieval silver ornaments, Polish and foreign coins, and silver scrap, as well as a rare collection of denarii minted by Palatine Sieciech.

In November, 2020, another hoard of 6500 cross denarii and 4 golden rings was found at nearly the same spot as the first hoard.
