= Pruszków (disambiguation) =

Pruszków is a town in Masovian Voivodeship (east-central Poland).

Pruszków may also refer to:

- Pruszków, Łask County in Łódź Voivodeship (central Poland)
- Pruszków, Skierniewice County in Łódź Voivodeship (central Poland)
- Pruszków, Greater Poland Voivodeship (west-central Poland)
- Pruszków, Lubusz Voivodeship (west Poland)
