= Gmina Mycielin =

Gmina Mycielin Mycielin Commune
- Gmina
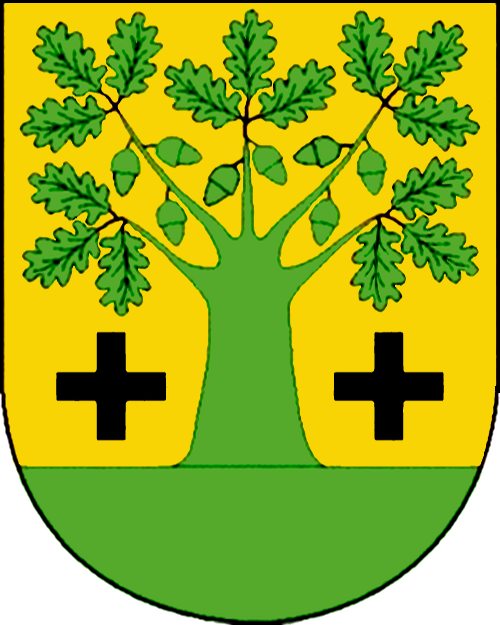
- Coat of arms
- Interactive map of Gmina Mycielin
- Coordinates (Słuszków): 51°56′N 18°15′E
- Country: Poland
- Voivodeship: Greater Poland
- County: Kalisz County
- Seat: Słuszków

Area
  - Total: 110.81 km^{2} (42.78 sq mi)

Population (2006)
  - Total: 4,950
  - Density: 44.7/km^{2} (116/sq mi)
- Website: http://www.mycielin.pl/

Gmina Mycielin

The gmina covers an area of 110.81 square kilometres (42.8 sq mi), and as of 2006 its total population is 4,950.

== Villages ==
Gmina Mycielin contains the villages and settlements of Aleksandrów, Annówka, Bogusławice, Bugaj, Danowiec, Dzierzbin, Dzierzbin-Kolonia, Elżbietów, Gadów, Grabek, Jaszczury, Kazala Nowa, Kazala Stara, Klotyldów, Korzeniew, Kościelec, Kościelec-Kolonia, Kukułka, Kuszyn, Mycielin, Nowiny, Przyranie, Słuszków, Stropieszyn, Teodorów and Zamęty.

== Neighbouring gminas ==
Gmina Mycielin is bordered by the gminas of Ceków-Kolonia, Malanów, Rychwał, Stawiszyn, Tuliszków and Żelazków.
