= Brzeziny, Kalisz County =

Brzeziny
- Village
- Location within Poland
- Coordinates: 51°35′N 18°15′E
- Country: Poland
- Voivodeship: Greater Poland
- County: Kalisz
- Gmina: Brzeziny

Brzeziny [bʐɛˈʑinɨ] is a village in Kalisz County, Greater Poland Voivodeship, in west-central Poland. It is the seat of the gmina (administrative district) called Gmina Brzeziny.
