= Proskauer =

Proskauer is a surname. Notable people with the surname include:

- Adolph Proskauer (1838–1900), Prussian-born Confederate soldier
- Bernhard Proskauer (1851–1915), German chemist and hygienist
- Johannes Max Proskauer (1923–1970), German-born American botanist
- Joseph M. Proskauer (1877–1971), American judge, lawyer, and philanthropist
- Julien Proskauer (1893–1958), American magician
- Nancy Proskauer Dryfoos (1918–1991) born as Nancy Edith Proskauer, American sculptor

== See also ==
- Proskauer Rose, a law firm
