= Pruszków, Greater Poland Voivodeship =

Pruszków
- Village
- Location within Poland
- Coordinates: 51°48′N 18°3′E
- Country: Poland
- Voivodeship: Greater Poland
- County: Kalisz
- Gmina: Blizanów

Pruszków [ˈpruʂkuf] is a village in the administrative district of Gmina Blizanów, within Kalisz County, Greater Poland Voivodeship, in west-central Poland.
