= Czajków =

Czajków may refer to the following places:

- Czajków, Kalisz County in Greater Poland Voivodeship (west-central Poland)
- Czajków, Lesser Poland Voivodeship (south Poland)
- Czajków, Masovian Voivodeship (east-central Poland)
- Czajków, Ostrzeszów County in Greater Poland Voivodeship (west-central Poland)
- Czajków, Turek County in Greater Poland Voivodeship (west-central Poland)
