= Gmina Lisków =

Gmina Lisków Lisków Commune
- Gmina
- Coat of arms

- Coordinates (Lisków): 51°50′N 18°24′E
- Country: Poland
- Voivodeship: Greater Poland
- County: Kalisz County
- Seat: Lisków

Area
  - Total: 75.83 km^{2} (29.28 sq mi)

Population (2006)
  - Total: 5,454
  - Density: 71.92/km^{2} (186.3/sq mi)
- Website: http://www.liskow.pl

Gmina Lisków is a rural gmina (administrative district) in Kalisz County, Greater Poland Voivodeship, in west-central Poland. Its seat is the village of Lisków, which lies approximately 24 kilometres (15 mi) east of Kalisz and 120 km (75 mi) south-east of the regional capital Poznań.

The gmina covers an area of 75.83 square kilometres (29.3 sq mi), and as of 2006 its total population is 5,454.

== Villages ==
Gmina Lisków contains the villages and settlements of Annopol, Budy Liskowskie, Chrusty, Ciepielew, Józefów, Koźlątków, Lisków, Lisków-Rzgów, Madalin, Małgów, Nadzież, Pyczek, Strzałków, Swoboda, Trzebienie, Wygoda, Zakrzyn, Zakrzyn-Kolonia and Żychów.

== Neighbouring gminas ==
Gmina Lisków is bordered by the gminas of Ceków-Kolonia, Goszczanów, Kawęczyn and Koźminek.
