= Lipe, Greater Poland Voivodeship =

Lipe
- Village
- Location within Poland
- Coordinates: 51°56′N 18°1′E
- Country: Poland
- Voivodeship: Greater Poland
- County: Kalisz
- Gmina: Blizanów

Lipe [ˈlipɛ] is a village in the administrative district of Gmina Blizanów, within Kalisz County, Greater Poland Voivodeship, in west-central Poland.
