= Zajączki, Kalisz County =

Zajączki
- Village
- Location within Poland
- Coordinates: 51°38′3″N 18°15′12″E
- Country: Poland
- Voivodeship: Greater Poland
- County: Kalisz
- Gmina: Brzeziny

Zajączki [zaˈjɔnt͡ʂki] is a village in the administrative district of Gmina Brzeziny, within Kalisz County, Greater Poland Voivodeship, in west-central Poland.
