= Tchaikovsky (surname) =

Tchaikovsky and its feminine variant Tchaikovskaya is a common transliteration (via French language) of the Russian language surname Чайковский. The surname itself is a Russian-language variant of the Polish surname Czajkowski, see this page for name origin.

Transliterated spellings in various languages include Tschaikowski (German), Ciajkovskij (Italian), Tsjaikovski (Dutch), Csajkovszkij (Hungarian), Chaikovski (Spanish), Tjajkovskij (Swedish), Tsjajkovskij (Norwegian), Čaikovskis (Latvian and Lithuanian), Tchaikovski (Portuguese), Txaikovski (Catalan) and Tšaikovski (Estonian and Finnish).

It has also been rendered as Tchaikovski, Chaikovsky, Chaykovsky, Chaikovskiy, Chaykovskiy, and Chaikovskii. Among Slavic languages which use the Latin alphabet, it frequently occurs in its Polish version, Czajkowski, or as Čajkovský (Czech and Slovak) and Čajkovski (Slovenian, Croatian, Bosnian).

The surname as transliterated into other languages may refer to the following persons. For the original, Polish spelling, see Czajkowski (surname).

- Alexander Tchaikovsky (1946-), Russian classical composer
- André Tchaikowsky (also Andrzej Czajkowski; born Robert Andrzej Krauthammer; 1935–1982), Polish classical pianist and composer
- Adrian Tchaikovsky (born 1972), British fantasy writer of Polish extraction
- Beny Tchaicovsky (1954–2009), painter and musician
- Boris Tchaikovsky (1925–1996), Russian classical composer
- Bram Tchaikovsky (born 1950), English lead vocalist and guitarist for the eponymous power pop band; original name Peter Bramall
- Kasyan Chaykovsky (1893–1938), Russian military commander; comcor in World War I; executed in Stalinist purge; rehabilitated 1956
- Modest Ilyich Tchaikovsky (1850–1916), Russian playwright and opera librettist; brother of Pyotr Ilyich Tchaikovsky
- Nikolai Tchaikovsky (1851–1926), Russian writer of influential revolutionary socialist tracts
- Pyotr Ilyich Tchaikovsky (1840–1893), Russian classical composer
- Ivan Chaikivskyi (born 1972), Ukrainian agricultural magnate and politician

== Similar surnames ==
- Israel Lyon Chaikoff (1902–1966), Canadian-American physiologist
- Joseph Chaikov (1888–1979), Ukrainian sculptor

== See also ==
- Tchaikovsky (disambiguation)
