= Korzeniew =

- Village
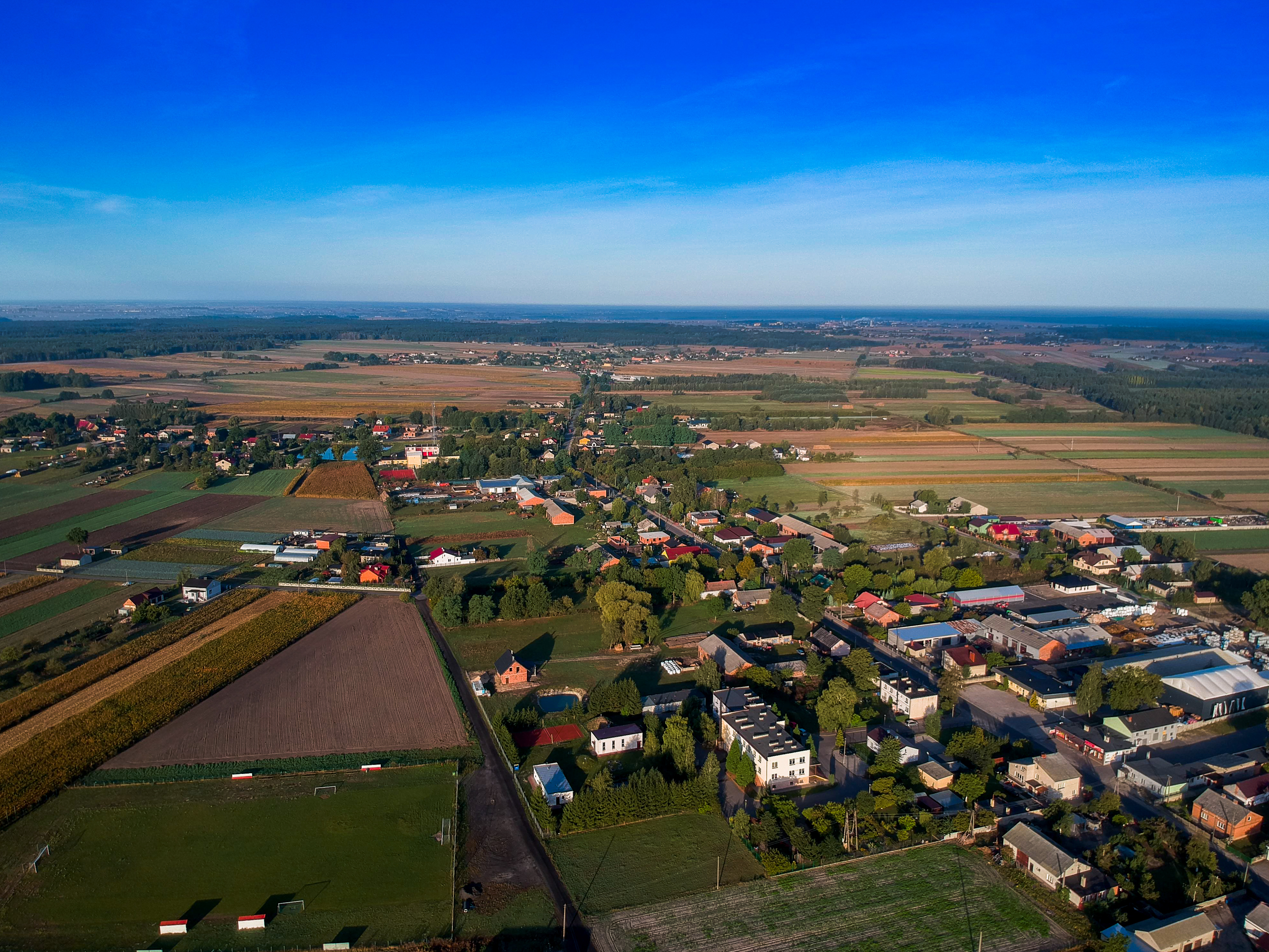

- Location within Poland
- Coordinates: 51°56′N 18°12′E
- Country: Poland
- Voivodeship: Greater Poland
- County: Kalisz
- Gmina: Mycielin

Population
  - Total: 563
- Time zone: UTC+1 (CET)
  - Summer (DST): UTC+2 (CEST)
- Vehicle registration: PKA

Korzeniew [kɔˈʐɛɲɛf] is a village in Kalisz County, Greater Poland Voivodeship, in central Poland. It is in the administrative district of Gmina Mycielin.

During the German occupation of Poland (World War II), the occupiers renamed the village to Wurzelroden.
