= Lipe (Smederevo) =

Coordinates: 44.638°N 20.993166°E

Lipe Липе
- Village (Selo)
- Interactive map of Lipe
- Country: Serbia
- District: Podunavlje
- Municipality: Smederevo

Population (2022)
  - Total: 2,727
- Time zone: UTC+1 (CET)
  - Summer (DST): UTC+2 (CEST)

Lipe (Serbian Cyrillic: Липе) is a village in eastern Serbia, in the municipality of Smederevo, 8 km (5 mi) from Smederevo, It is between two great rivers, the Danube and the Great Morava, and has an area of 16 km^{2} (6 sq mi). Among the largest villages in the municipality, it, according to the latest census, has 1,076 households and around 4000 residents.

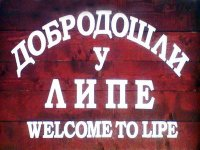
Sign on the entrance to the village

Legend has it that village Lipe had received its name a few thousand years back. In the region of today's Transdanubia a tribe settled which used linden trees for their homes. Hence arose the name Lipe (Serbian word, meaning Linden). Lipe is rich in water. Aside from Great Morava there are two canals of Železara factory flowing through it, as well as many pounds, smaller rivers and the artificial pound Zverenje. The most beautiful part of the village is the center where you can find various shops, a bigger market, discos, as well as the hall for ceremonies, a church and a park. Among cultural events there are two fairs held each year on May 22 and Sep 23. But the most significant is the event held from 26 to May 31 by the name “Pastirski dani” (loosely translated: “Shepherd days”) with regard to exhibit various sorts of sheep. Of course, the place of honor has the so-called “Linden sheep”, a unique sort of sheep which lives in the municipality of Smederevo. It is home of football club FK Sloboda Lipe.

== See also ==
- Populated places in Serbia
