= Zajączek (surname) =

Zajączek is a Polish surname. Archaic feminine forms (still used colloquially): Zajączkowa (after husband), Zajączkówna (after father). Notable people with the surname include:

- Aleksandra Zajączkowa (1754 - 1845), Polish noblewoman
- Józef Zajączek (1752–1826), Polish general and politician
