= Korab (given name) =

Korab is an Albanian surname or male given name. It derives from Mount Korab, the highest mountain in Albania. The name Korab may refer to:

== See also ==
- Korab (surname)
