= Gmina Brzeziny, Greater Poland Voivodeship =

Gmina Brzeziny Brzeziny Commune
- Gmina
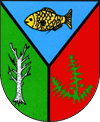
- Coat of arms
- Interactive map of Gmina Brzeziny
- Coordinates (Brzeziny): 51°35′N 18°15′E
- Country: Poland
- Voivodeship: Greater Poland
- County: Kalisz County
- Seat: Brzeziny

Area
  - Total: 127.05 km^{2} (49.05 sq mi)

Population (2006)
  - Total: 5,866
  - Density: 46.17/km^{2} (119.6/sq mi)
- Website: http://www.brzeziny-gmina.pl

Gmina Brzeziny is a rural gmina (administrative district) in Kalisz County, Greater Poland Voivodeship, in west-central Poland. Its seat is the village of Brzeziny, which lies approximately 23 kilometres (14 mi) south-east of Kalisz and 129 km (80 mi) south-east of the regional capital Poznań.

The gmina covers an area of 127.05 square kilometres (49.1 sq mi), and as of 2006 its total population is 5,866.

== Villages ==
Gmina Brzeziny contains the villages and settlements of Aleksandria, Brzeziny, Chudoba, Czempisz, Dzięcioły, Fajum, Jagodziniec, Jamnice, Moczalec, Ostrów Kaliski, Pieczyska, Piegonisko-Pustkowie, Piegonisko-Wieś, Przystajnia, Przystajnia-Kolonia, Rożenno, Sobiesęki, Wrząca, Zagórna and Zajączki.

== Neighbouring gminas ==
Gmina Brzeziny is bordered by the gminas of Błaszki, Brąszewice, Czajków, Kraszewice, Sieroszewice and Szczytniki.
