= Chaykovsky (inhabited locality) =

Chaykovsky (Russian: Чайковский; masculine), Chaykovskaya (Чайковская; feminine), or Chaykovskoye (Чайковское; neuter) is the name of several inhabited localities in Russia.

Urban localities

- Chaykovsky, Perm Krai, a town in Perm Krai

Rural localities

- Chaykovsky, Krasnoyarsk Krai, a settlement in Chaykovsky Selsoviet of Bogotolsky District in Krasnoyarsk Krai
- Chaykovskoye, Republic of Crimea, a selo in Simferopolsky District of the Republic of Crimea
- Chaykovskoye, Kaliningrad Oblast, a settlement in Mozyrsky Rural Okrug of Pravdinsky District in Kaliningrad Oblast
- Chaykovskaya, a settlement at the station in Nytvensky District of Perm Krai

See also

- Chaykovskogo, a settlement in Klinsky District of Moscow Oblast
