= Nancy Proskauer Dryfoos =

American sculptor (1918–1991)

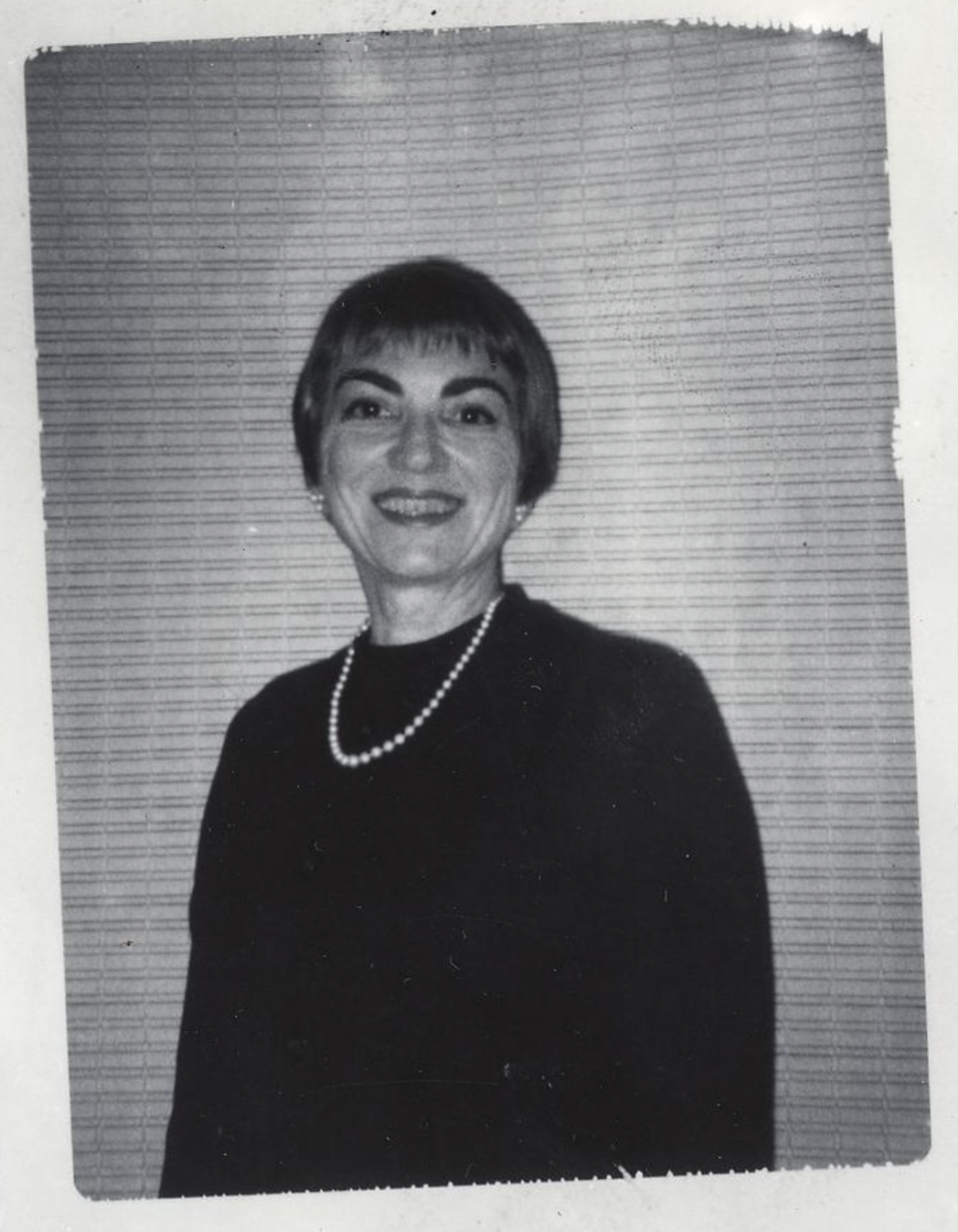
- Nancy Proskauer Dryfoos, 1954
- Born: Nancy Edith Proskauer; March 25, 1918; New Rochelle, New York, U.S.
- Died: October 13, 1991 (aged 73); New York City, U.S.
- Education: Drew Seminary, Sarah Lawrence College (BA), Columbia University, Art Students League of New York
- Occupation: Sculptor
- Spouse: Donald Dryfoos (m. 1938)

Nancy Proskauer Dryfoos (March 25, 1918 – October 13, 1991; née Nancy Edith Proskauer) was an American sculptor. She was known for her works in stone and terra cotta.

== Life and career ==
Nancy Proskauer Dryfoos was born as Nancy Edith Proskauer on March 25, 1918, in New Rochelle, New York. The family was Jewish, her mother was philanthropist Edith Harris Proskauer, and her father was investor Richman Proskauer. In 1938, she married Donald Dryfoos, a rare book collector. They never had any children and remained married until her death.

Dryfoos attended Drew Seminary; Sarah Lawrence College (B.A. 1936), with Kurt Roesch; the Columbia University's School of Architecture (now Columbia Graduate School of Architecture, Planning and Preservation) with Oronzio Maldarelli; and at the Art Students League of New York. She also worked under Jose de Creeft.

Dryfoos showed her work at annual exhibitions between 1948 and 1972, with the Allied Artists of America, the Brooklyn Museum, the Syracuse Museum of Fine Arts (now Everson Museum of Art), the National Academy of Design, and others.

In the 1950s, she chaired the Tercentenary Fine Arts Committee, to mark the anniversary of the American Jewish tercentenary.

She won many awards, including the Edel Award for Fine Arts, the "Constance K. Livingston Award" from the American Society of Contemporary Artists, the "Gold Medal of Honor" from the Allied Artists of America, and the Naomi Lehman Memorial Award.

== Death and legacy ==
She died of a heart attack on October 13, 1991, in New York City. She had also struggled with lung cancer at the end of life.

Her artwork is in collections at Boca Raton Museum of Art in Florida, Brandeis University, Columbia University, New York University, and Kean University in New Jersey.
