= Korab (surname) =

Korab is a surname.

The last name Korab was first found in East Prussia and Poland. Its meaning comes from an archaic Polish word for 'boat', 'ark', 'barge' (still used in Russian and other Slavonic languages). An older meaning of the Polish word was 'old tree'. It is also the crest-name of a Polish coat of arms which depicts a boat with a tower at its center. Conflicting legends place its origin in Germany, England or even ancient Rome.

As of 2014, the surname Korab is most commonly found in Poland.

Notable bearers of the surname include:

- Balthazar Korab (1926–2013), Hungarian-American photographer
- Henryk Korab-Janiewicz (1897–1971), Polish-American historian
- Jamie Korab (born 1979), Canadian curler
- Jerry Korab (born 1948), Canadian hockey player
- Stanisław Korab-Brzozowski (1876–1901), Polish poet

== See also ==
- Korab (given name)
