= Czajki =

Czajki may refer to the following places:

- Czajki, Lublin Voivodeship (east Poland)
- Czajki, Masovian Voivodeship (east-central Poland)
- Czajki, Podlaskie Voivodeship (north-east Poland)
- Czajki, Greater Poland Voivodeship (west-central Poland)
