= Jamnice, Czech Republic =

Jamnice
- Village
- Location within Czech Republic
- Coordinates: 49°57′N 17°47′E
- Country: Czech Republic
- Region: Moravian-Silesian
- District: Opava

Jamnice is a village in the municipality of Stěbořice in the Opava District, Czech Republic. In 2009, there were 70 registered addresses. In 2001, there were 251 permanent inhabitants.
