= Kalisz County =

Kalisz County Powiat kaliski
- County
- Flag Coat of arms

- Location within the voivodeship
- Coordinates (Kalisz): 51°45′27″N 18°4′48″E
- Country: Poland
- Voivodeship: Greater Poland
- Seat: Kalisz
- Gminas: Total 11: Gmina Blizanów; Gmina Brzeziny; Gmina Ceków-Kolonia; Gmina Godziesze Wielkie; Gmina Koźminek; Gmina Lisków; Gmina Mycielin; Gmina Opatówek; Gmina Stawiszyn; Gmina Szczytniki; Gmina Żelazków

Area
  - Total: 1,160.02 km^{2} (447.89 sq mi)

Population (2006)
  - Total: 80,369
  - Density: 69.282/km^{2} (179.44/sq mi)
  - Urban: 1,554
  - Rural: 78,815
- Car plates: PKA
- Website: www.powiat.kalisz.pl

Kalisz County (Polish: powiat kaliski) is a unit of territorial administration and local government (powiat) in Greater Poland Voivodeship, west-central Poland. It came into being on 1 January 1999 as a result of the Polish local government reforms passed in 1998. Its administrative seat is the city of Kalisz, although the city is not part of the county (it constitutes a separate city county). The only town in Kalisz County is Stawiszyn, which lies 18 km (11 mi) north of Kalisz.

The county covers an area of 1,160.02 square kilometres (447.9 sq mi). As of 2006 its total population is 80,369, out of which the population of Stawiszyn is 1,554 and the rural population is 78,815.

== Neighbouring counties ==
Apart from the city of Kalisz, Kalisz County is also bordered by Konin County to the north, Turek County to the north-east, Sieradz County to the east, Ostrzeszów County to the south, Ostrów County to the west and Pleszew County to the north-west.

== Administrative divisions ==
The county is subdivided into 11 gminas (one urban-rural and 10 rural). These are listed in the following table, in descending order of population.

Gmina	Type	Area (km^{2})	Population (2006)	Seat
Gmina Opatówek	urban-rural	104.3	10,148	Opatówek
Gmina Blizanów	rural	157.8	9,251	Blizanów
Gmina Żelazków	rural	113.6	8,942	Żelazków
Gmina Godziesze Wielkie	rural	105.1	8,385	Godziesze Wielkie
Gmina Szczytniki	rural	110.7	8,086	Szczytniki
Gmina Koźminek	rural	88.4	7,514	Koźminek
Gmina Stawiszyn	urban-rural	78.3	7,244	Stawiszyn
Gmina Brzeziny	rural	127.1	5,866	Brzeziny
Gmina Lisków	rural	75.8	5,454	Lisków
Gmina Mycielin	rural	110.8	4,950	Korzeniew
Gmina Ceków-Kolonia	rural	88.2	4,529	Ceków-Kolonia

== Notable residents ==
- Karolina Pawliczak (born 1976), lawyer and politician
