= Kwiatkowski =

Kwiatkowski (Polish pronunciation: [kfʲatˈkɔfskʲi]; feminine: Kwiatkowska [kfʲatˈkɔfska]; plural: Kwiatkowscy [kfʲatˈkɔfst͡sɘ]) is the 15th most common surname in Poland (66,917 people in 2009). It comes from place names such as Kwiatków, Kwiatkowo, or Kwiatkowice, which are derived from the Polish word kwiatek ('flower'). Associated with this surname are the Polish noble families bearing the seals of Drogomir, Gryf, Jastrzębiec, Korab, Nałęcz, Nowina, Rola, Strzemię, Wieruszowa, or Własne.

== Related surnames ==
Language	Masculine	Feminine
Polish	Kwiatkowski	Kwiatkowska
Lithuanian	Kvietkauskas	Kvietkauskaitė
Russian (Romanization)	Квятковский (Kvyatkovsky, Kvyatkovskiy, Kviatkovsky, Kviatkovski)	Квятковская (Kvyatkovskaya, Kviatkovskaia)
Ukrainian (Romanization)	Квятковський (Kvyatkovskyi, Kvyatkovskyy, Kviatkovskyi)	Квятковська (Kvyatkovska, Kviatkovska)

== Notable people ==
- Anita Kwiatkowska (born 1985), Polish volleyball player
- Barbara Kwiatkowska-Lass (1940–1995), Polish actress
- Bronisław Kwiatkowski (1950–2010), Polish military commander
- Eugeniusz Kwiatkowski (1888–1974), Polish politician and economist
- Grzegorz Kwiatkowski (born 1984), Polish poet and musician
- Halina Kwiatkowska (1921–2020), Polish actress
- Heinz Kwiatkowski (1926–2008), German football goalkeeper
- Henryk de Kwiatkowski (1924–2003), Polish-born aeronautical engineer and horse breeder
- Irena Kwiatkowska (1912–2011), Polish actress
- Joel Kwiatkowski (born 1977), Canadian ice hockey player
- Karen Kwiatkowski (born 1960), American Air Force officer and writer
- Krzysztof Kwiatkowski (born 1971), Polish politician
- Ladimir Kwiatkowski (1928–1994), American television personality
- Łukasz Kwiatkowski (1982–2018), Polish cyclist
- Marta Kwiatkowska (born 1957), Polish-British computer scientist
- Mirosława Jastrzębska née Kwiatkowska (1921 - 1982), Polish scientist, ethnographer, museum curator
- Michał Kwiatkowski (born 1983), Polish singer known as Michal in France
- Michał Kwiatkowski (born 1990), Polish cyclist
- Mickey Kwiatkowski (born 1947), American football coach
- Oskar Kwiatkowski (born 1996), Polish snowboarder
- Paloma Kwiatkowski (born 1994), Canadian actress
- Thai-Son Kwiatkowski (born 1995), American tennis player
- Teofil Kwiatkowski (1809–1891), Polish painter
- Tonia Kwiatkowski (born 1971), American figure skater
- Zbigniew Kwiatkowski (born 1985), Polish handballer
- Aleksandr Kvyatkovsky (1853–1880), Russian revolutionary
- Andriy Kviatkovskyi (born 1990), Ukrainian freestyle wrestler

== See also ==
- Gryf coat of arms (Kwiatkowski, Kwiatkowicz, Kwiatkiewicz, Kwieciński)
- Kwiatków (disambiguation)
- Kwiatkowice (disambiguation)
