= Chrząstawa =

Chrząstawa may refer to:

- Chrząstawa River
- Chrząstawa (city) (Gmina Widawa, Łask County, Lodz Voivodeship)
- Chrząstawa, Łódź Voivodeship (central Poland)

Two places in Gmina Czernica, Poland

- Chrząstawa Mała
- Chrząstawa Wielka
