= Widawski =

Widawski (feminine: Widawska) is a Polish surname. Notable people with the surname include:

- Bogusław Widawski (1934–1986), Polish footballer
- Chaim Widawski (c. 1906–1944), Polish activist and Holocaust victim
- Daria Widawska (born 1977), Polish actress
- Jehuda Widawski (1919–2026), birth name of Yehuda Aharon Vidovsky, Israeli businessman and Holocaust survivor of Polish origin.
- Jerzy Widawski (c. 1896–2000), Polish flight instructor, test pilot

== See also ==
- Józefów Widawski, a village in Poland
- Dąbrowa Widawska, a village in Poland
