= Dobków =

Dobków may refer to the following places in Poland:

- Dobków, Lower Silesian Voivodeship (south-west Poland)
- Dobków, Łódź Voivodeship (central Poland)
