= Ochle-Kolonia =

- Village
- Location within Poland
- Coordinates: 51°21′53″N 18°55′28″E
- Country: Poland
- Voivodeship: Łódź
- County: Łask
- Gmina: Widawa

Ochle-Kolonia [ˈɔxlɛ kɔˈlɔɲa] is a village in the administrative district of Gmina Widawa, within Łask County, Łódź Voivodeship, in central Poland.
