= Sowińce =

- Village
- Location within Poland
- Coordinates: 51°30′53″N 19°13′57″E
- Country: Poland
- Voivodeship: Łódź
- County: Łask
- Gmina: Buczek

Sowińce [sɔˈviɲt͡sɛ] is a village in the administrative district of Gmina Buczek, within Łask County, Łódź Voivodeship, in central Poland.
