= Okup Mały =

- Village
- Location within Poland
- Coordinates: 51°36′N 19°4′E
- Country: Poland
- Voivodeship: Łódź
- County: Łask
- Gmina: Łask

Okup Mały [ˈɔkup ˈmawɨ] is a village in the administrative district of Gmina Łask, within Łask County, Łódź Voivodeship, in central Poland.
