= Kocina =

Kocina may refer to the following places:

- Kocina, Greater Poland Voivodeship (west-central Poland)
- Kocina, Łódź Voivodeship (central Poland)
- Kocina, Świętokrzyskie Voivodeship (south-central Poland)
