= Lucjanów =

Lucjanów may refer to the following places:

- Lucjanów, Łask County in Łódź Voivodeship (central Poland)
- Lucjanów, Gmina Żelechlinek, Tomaszów County in Łódź Voivodeship (central Poland)
- Lucjanów, Masovian Voivodeship (east-central Poland)
