= Raczynów =

- Village
- Location within Poland
- Coordinates: 51°20′59″N 19°0′36″E
- Country: Poland
- Voivodeship: Łódź
- County: Łask
- Gmina: Widawa
- Population: 40

Raczynów [raˈt͡ʂɨnuf] is a village in the administrative district of Gmina Widawa, within Łask County, Łódź Voivodeship, in central Poland.
