= Zielęcice, Łódź Voivodeship =

Zielęcice
- Village
- Location within Poland
- Coordinates: 51°34′46″N 19°4′40″E
- Country: Poland
- Voivodeship: Łódź
- County: Łask
- Gmina: Łask

Zielęcice [ʑɛlɛnˈt͡ɕit͡sɛ] is a village in the administrative district of Gmina Łask, within Łask County, Łódź Voivodeship, in central Poland.
