= Dobruchów =

- Village
- Location within Poland
- Coordinates: 51°44′N 19°6′E
- Country: Poland
- Voivodeship: Łódź
- County: Łask
- Gmina: Wodzierady

Dobruchów [dɔˈbruxuf] is a village in the administrative district of Gmina Wodzierady, within Łask County, Łódź Voivodeship, in central Poland.
