= Pruszków, Łask County =

Pruszków
- Village
- Location within Poland
- Coordinates: 51°32′27″N 19°3′49″E
- Country: Poland
- Voivodeship: Łódź
- County: Łask
- Gmina: Sędziejowice

Pruszków [ˈpruʂkuf] is a village in the administrative district of Gmina Sędziejowice, within Łask County, Łódź Voivodeship, in central Poland.
