= Piorunów =

Piorunów may refer to the following places:

- Piorunów, Greater Poland Voivodeship (west-central Poland)
- Piorunów, Łódź Voivodeship (central Poland)
- Piorunów, Masovian Voivodeship (east-central Poland)
