= Dąbrówka, Łask County =

Dąbrówka
- Village
- Location within Poland
- Coordinates: 51°33′13″N 19°6′58″E
- Country: Poland
- Voivodeship: Łódź
- County: Łask
- Gmina: Buczek

Dąbrówka [dɔmˈbrufka] is a village in the administrative district of Gmina Buczek, within Łask County, Łódź Voivodeship, in central Poland.
