= Rokitnica =

Rokitnica may refer to the following places in Poland:

- Rokitnica, Lower Silesian Voivodeship (south-west Poland)
- Rokitnica, Łask County in Łódź Voivodeship (central Poland)
- Rokitnica, Zgierz County in Łódź Voivodeship (central Poland)
- Rokitnica, Masovian Voivodeship (east-central Poland)
- Rokitnica, Lubusz Voivodeship (west Poland)
- Rokitnica, Pomeranian Voivodeship (north Poland)
