= Sięganów =

- Village
- Location within Poland
- Coordinates: 51°34′N 19°6′E
- Country: Poland
- Voivodeship: Łódź
- County: Łask
- Gmina: Łask

Sięganów [ɕɛŋˈɡanuf] is a village in the administrative district of Gmina Łask, within Łask County, Łódź Voivodeship, in central Poland.
