= Wrzesiny, Łódź Voivodeship =

Wrzesiny
- Village
- Location within Poland
- Coordinates: 51°33′7″N 19°0′18″E
- Country: Poland
- Voivodeship: Łódź
- County: Łask
- Gmina: Sędziejowice

Wrzesiny [vʐɛˈɕinɨ] is a village in the administrative district of Gmina Sędziejowice, within Łask County, Łódź Voivodeship, in central Poland.
