= Osiny, Łask County =

Osiny
- Village
- Location within Poland
- Coordinates: 51°28′38″N 19°02′30″E
- Country: Poland
- Voivodeship: Łódź
- County: Łask
- Gmina: Sędziejowice

Osiny [ɔˈɕinɨ] is a village in the administrative district of Gmina Sędziejowice, within Łask County, Łódź Voivodeship, in central Poland.
