= Włodzimierz, Łask County =

Włodzimierz
- Village
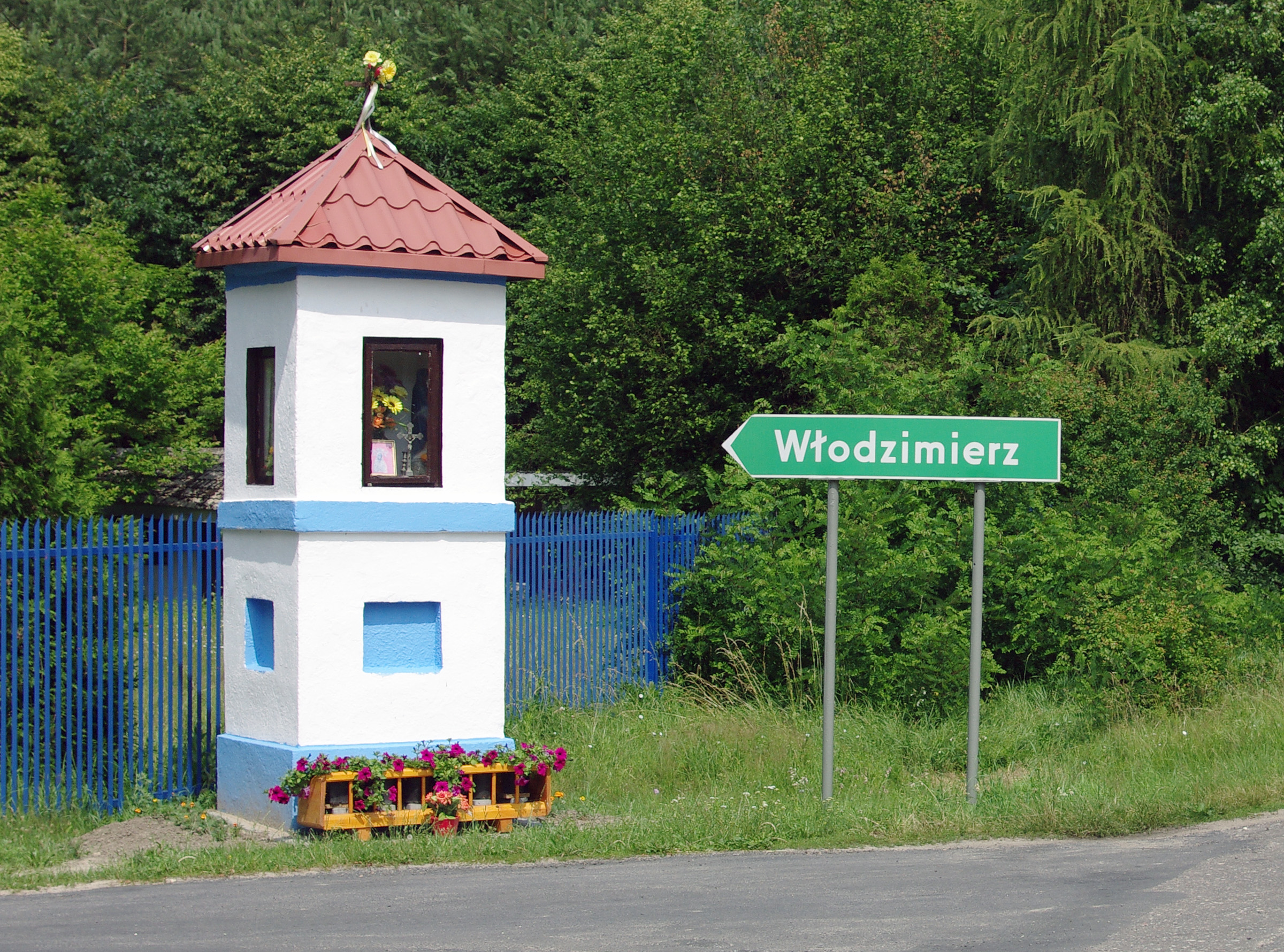
- The entrance to the village from Janowice

- Location within Poland
- Coordinates: 51°42′14″N 19°10′58″E
- Country: Poland
- Voivodeship: Łódź
- County: Łask
- Gmina: Wodzierady
- Population: 171

Włodzimierz [vwɔˈd͡ʑimjɛʂ] is a village in the administrative district of Gmina Wodzierady, within Łask County, Łódź Voivodeship, in central Poland.
