= Leśnica, Łódź Voivodeship =

Leśnica
- Village
- Location within Poland
- Coordinates: 51°43′21″N 19°7′6″E
- Country: Poland
- Voivodeship: Łódź
- County: Łask
- Gmina: Wodzierady

Leśnica [lɛɕˈnit͡sa] is a village in the administrative district of Gmina Wodzierady, within Łask County, Łódź Voivodeship, in central Poland.
