= Zamość, Łask County =

Zamość
- Settlement
- Location within Poland
- Coordinates: 51°27′32″N 18°59′24″E
- Country: Poland
- Voivodeship: Łódź
- County: Łask
- Gmina: Sędziejowice

Zamość (Polish pronunciation: [ˈzamɔɕt͡ɕ]) is a settlement in the administrative district of Gmina Sędziejowice, within Łask County, Łódź Voivodeship, in central Poland.
