= Wronowice, Łódź Voivodeship =

Wronowice
- Village
- Location within Poland
- Coordinates: 51°37′9″N 19°9′58″E
- Country: Poland
- Voivodeship: Łódź
- County: Łask
- Gmina: Łask
- Population: 430
- Time zone: UTC+1 (CET)
  - Summer (DST): UTC+2 (CEST)
- Vehicle registration: ELA
- Primary airport: Łódź Władysław Reymont Airport

Wronowice [vrɔnɔˈvit͡sɛ] is a village in the administrative district of Gmina Łask, within Łask County, Łódź Voivodeship, in central Poland.

== History ==
Some Polish farmers from Wronowice were among the victims of a massacre of 30 Poles perpetrated by German soldiers in Chechło near Pabianice on 8 September 1939, during the German invasion of Poland which started World War II (see Nazi crimes against the Polish nation).
