= Wilkowyja =

Wilkowyja may refer to the following places:

- Wilkowyja, Gniezno County in Greater Poland Voivodeship (west-central Poland)
- Wilkowyja, Łask County in Łódź Voivodeship (central Poland)
- Wilkowyja, Masovian Voivodeship (east-central Poland)
- Wilkowyja, Jarocin County in Greater Poland Voivodeship (west-central Poland)
