= Dąbrowa, Łask County =

Dąbrowa
- Village
- Location within Poland
- Coordinates: 51°31′39″N 19°5′48″E
- Country: Poland
- Voivodeship: Łódź
- County: Łask
- Gmina: Buczek
- Population: 70

Dąbrowa [dɔmˈbrɔva] is a village in the administrative district of Gmina Buczek, within Łask County, Łódź Voivodeship, in central Poland.
