= Łazów =

Łazów may refer to the following places:

- Łazów, Łask County in Łódź Voivodeship (central Poland)
- Łazów, Radomsko County in Łódź Voivodeship (central Poland)
- Łazów, Subcarpathian Voivodeship (south-east Poland)
- Łazów, Masovian Voivodeship (east-central Poland)
