= Grabia, Łódź Voivodeship =

Grabia
- Village
- Location within Poland
- Coordinates: 51°31′28″N 18°58′53″E
- Country: Poland
- Voivodeship: Łódź
- County: Łask
- Gmina: Sędziejowice

Grabia [ˈɡrabja] is a village in the administrative district of Gmina Sędziejowice, within Łask County, Łódź Voivodeship, in central Poland.
