= Bilew =

- Village
- Location within Poland
- Coordinates: 51°35′N 19°3′E
- Country: Poland
- Voivodeship: Łódź
- County: Łask
- Gmina: Sędziejowice

Bilew [ˈbilɛf] is a village in the administrative district of Gmina Sędziejowice, within Łask County, Łódź Voivodeship, located in central Poland.
