= Zalesie, Łask County =

Zalesie
- Village
- Location within Poland
- Coordinates: 51°40′58″N 19°10′5″E
- Country: Poland
- Voivodeship: Łódź
- County: Łask
- Gmina: Wodzierady

Zalesie [zaˈlɛɕɛ] is a village in the administrative district of Gmina Wodzierady, within Łask County, Łódź Voivodeship, in central Poland.
