= Marzenin =

Marzenin may refer to the following places:

- Marzenin, Greater Poland Voivodeship (west-central Poland)
- Marzenin, Łódź Voivodeship (central Poland)
- Marzenin, Lubusz Voivodeship (west Poland)
