= Anielin, Łask County =

Anielin
- Village
- Location within Poland
- Coordinates: 51°38′2″N 19°7′24″E
- Country: Poland
- Voivodeship: Łódź
- County: Łask
- Gmina: Łask
- Population: 270

Anielin [aˈɲɛlin] is a village in the administrative district of Gmina Łask, within Łask County, Łódź Voivodeship, in central Poland.
