= Kowalew, Łódź Voivodeship =

Kowalew
- Village
- Location within Poland
- Coordinates: 51°29′28″N 19°8′57″E
- Country: Poland
- Voivodeship: Łódź
- County: Łask
- Gmina: Buczek

Kowalew [kɔˈvalɛf] is a village in the administrative district of Gmina Buczek, within Łask County, Łódź Voivodeship, in central Poland.
