= Dębina =

Debina or Dębina may refer to:

== Places in Poland ==
=== Greater Poland Voivodeship ===
- Dębina, Gniezno County
- Dębina, Gostyń County
- Dębina, Koło County
- Dębina, Szamotuły County
- Dębina, Wągrowiec County
- Dębina, Września County
- Dębina, a park and neighbourhood in the Wilda, Poznań

=== Lesser Poland Voivodeship ===
- Dębina, Lesser Poland Voivodeship

=== Łódź Voivodeship ===
- Dębina, Łask County
- Dębina, Sieradz County
- Dębina, Wieluń County
- Dębina, Wieruszów County
- Dębina, Gmina Kleszczów
- Dębina, Gmina Kutno
- Dębina, Gmina Rusiec
- Dębina, Gmina Strzelce

=== Lower Silesian Voivodeship ===
- Dębina, Lower Silesian Voivodeship

=== Lublin Voivodeship ===
- Dębina, Chełm County
- Dębina, Hrubieszów County
- Dębina, Kraśnik County
- Dębina, Włodawa County
- Dębina, Gmina Strzyżewice
- Dębina, Gmina Tyszowce
- Dębina, Gmina Ulhówek
- Dębina, Gmina Zakrzew

=== Masovian Voivodeship ===
- Dębina, Masovian Voivodeship

=== Opole Voivodeship ===
- Dębina, Olesno County
- Dębina, Prudnik County

=== Podlaskie Voivodeship ===
- Dębina, Podlaskie Voivodeship

=== Pomeranian Voivodeship ===
- Dębina, Kościerzyna County
- Dębina, Malbork County
- Dębina, Słupsk County
- Dębina, Tczew County
- Dębina, Wejherowo County

=== Subcarpathian Voivodeship ===
- Dębina, Subcarpathian Voivodeship

=== West Pomeranian Voivodeship ===
- Dębina, West Pomeranian Voivodeship

== Other uses ==
- Debina (grape), a Greek wine grape
- Debina Bonnerjee (born 1973), Indian actress
