= Nowe Kozuby =

- Village
- Location within Poland
- Coordinates: 51°29′38″N 19°1′13″E
- Country: Poland
- Voivodeship: Łódź
- County: Łask
- Gmina: Sędziejowice

Nowe Kozuby [ˈnɔvɛ kɔˈzubɨ] is a village in the administrative district of Gmina Sędziejowice, within Łask County, Łódź Voivodeship, in central Poland.
