= Kwiatkowice =

Kwiatkowice may refer to:

- Kwiatkowice, Lower Silesian Voivodeship (south-west Poland)
- Kwiatkowice, Łódź Voivodeship (central Poland)
- Kwiatkowice, Lubusz Voivodeship (west Poland)

== See also ==
- Kwiatkowice-Kolonia
