= Alfonsów =

Alfonsów may refer to the following places:

- Alfonsów, Łask County in Łódź Voivodeship (central Poland)
- Alfonsów, Opoczno County in Łódź Voivodeship (central Poland)
- Alfonsów, Poddębice County in Łódź Voivodeship (central Poland)
- Alfonsów, Masovian Voivodeship (east-central Poland)
