= Krzucz =

- Village
- Location within Poland
- Coordinates: 51°38′38″N 19°7′44″E
- Country: Poland
- Voivodeship: Łódź
- County: Łask
- Gmina: Łask

Krzucz [kʂut͡ʂ] is a village in the administrative district of Gmina Łask, within Łask County, Łódź Voivodeship, in central Poland.
