= Brody, Łódź Voivodeship =

Brody
- Village
- Location within Poland
- Coordinates: 51°30′48″N 18°59′7″E
- Country: Poland
- Voivodeship: Łódź
- County: Łask
- Gmina: Sędziejowice
- Population: 100

Brody [ˈbrɔdɨ] is a village in the administrative district of Gmina Sędziejowice, within Łask County, Łódź Voivodeship, in central Poland.
