= Czestków B =

- Village
- Location within Poland
- Coordinates: 51°32′28″N 19°8′8″E
- Country: Poland
- Voivodeship: Łódź
- County: Łask
- Gmina: Buczek
- Population: 290

Czestków B is a village in the administrative district of Gmina Buczek, within Łask County, Łódź Voivodeship, in central Poland.
