= Czarny Las =

Czarny Las may refer to the following places:

- Czarny Las, Kuyavian-Pomeranian Voivodeship (north-central Poland)
- Czarny Las, Łask County in Łódź Voivodeship (central Poland)
- Czarny Las, Podlaskie Voivodeship (north-east Poland)
- Czarny Las, Radomsko County in Łódź Voivodeship (central Poland)
- Czarny Las, Zduńska Wola County in Łódź Voivodeship (central Poland)
- Czarny Las, Lublin Voivodeship (east Poland)
- Czarny Las, Gmina Grodzisk Mazowiecki in Masovian Voivodeship (east-central Poland)
- Czarny Las, Piaseczno County in Masovian Voivodeship (east-central Poland)
- Czarny Las, Greater Poland Voivodeship (west-central Poland)
- Czarny Las, Częstochowa County in Silesian Voivodeship (south Poland)
- Czarny Las, Lubliniec County in Silesian Voivodeship (south Poland)
