= Józefów, Łask County =

Józefów
- Village
- Location within Poland
- Coordinates: 51°42′28″N 19°09′29″E
- Country: Poland
- Voivodeship: Łódź
- County: Łask
- Gmina: Wodzierady

Józefów (Polish pronunciation: [juˈzɛfuf]) is a village in the administrative district of Gmina Wodzierady, within Łask County, Łódź Voivodeship, in central Poland.
