= Magdalenów =

Magdalenów may refer to the following places:

- Magdalenów, Greater Poland Voivodeship (west-central Poland)
- Magdalenów, Bełchatów County in Łódź Voivodeship (central Poland)
- Magdalenów, Łask County in Łódź Voivodeship (central Poland)
