= Bachorzyn =

- Village
- Location within Poland
- Coordinates: 51°30′N 19°11′E
- Country: Poland
- Voivodeship: Łódź
- County: Łask
- Gmina: Buczek
- Population: 310

Bachorzyn [baˈxɔʐɨn] is a village in the administrative district of Gmina Buczek, within Łask County, Łódź Voivodeship, in central Poland.
