= Osieczno =

- Village
- Location within Poland
- Coordinates: 51°24′9″N 18°50′53″E
- Country: Poland
- Voivodeship: Łódź
- County: Łask
- Gmina: Widawa

Osieczno [ɔˈɕɛt͡ʂnɔ] is a village in the administrative district of Gmina Widawa, within Łask County, Łódź Voivodeship, in central Poland.
