= Wydrzyn =

Wydrzyn may refer to the following places:

- Wydrzyn, Łask County in Łódź Voivodeship (central Poland)
- Wydrzyn, Wieluń County in Łódź Voivodeship (central Poland)
- Wydrzyn, Masovian Voivodeship (east-central Poland)
- Wydrzyn, Choszczno County in West Pomeranian Voivodeship (north-west Poland)
