= Siemiechów, Łódź Voivodeship =

Siemiechów
- Village
- Location within Poland
- Coordinates: 51°25′23″N 18°49′17″E
- Country: Poland
- Voivodeship: Łódź
- County: Łask
- Gmina: Widawa

Siemiechów [ɕɛˈmjɛxuf] is a village in the administrative district of Gmina Widawa, within Łask County, Łódź Voivodeship, in central Poland.
