= Rososza =

- Village
- Location within Poland
- Coordinates: 51°33′4″N 19°4′7″E
- Country: Poland
- Voivodeship: Łódź
- County: Łask
- Gmina: Sędziejowice

Rososza [rɔˈsɔʂa] is a village in the administrative district of Gmina Sędziejowice, within Łask County, Łódź Voivodeship, in central Poland.
