= Grabica, Łask County =

Grabica
- Village
- Location within Poland
- Coordinates: 51°28′37″N 18°59′33″E
- Country: Poland
- Voivodeship: Łódź
- County: Łask
- Gmina: Sędziejowice

Grabica [ɡraˈbit͡sa] is a village in the administrative district of Gmina Sędziejowice, within Łask County, Łódź Voivodeship, in central Poland.
