= Siedlce (disambiguation) =

Siedlce is a town in Masovian Voivodeship in east-central Poland.

Siedlce may also refer to:

- Siedlce, Gdańsk
- Siedlce, Lesser Poland Voivodeship (south Poland)
- Siedlce, Łódź Voivodeship (central Poland)
- Siedlce, Lubin County in Lower Silesian Voivodeship (south-west Poland)
- Siedlce, Oława County in Lower Silesian Voivodeship (south-west Poland)
- Siedlce, Świętokrzyskie Voivodeship (south-central Poland)
