= Pelagia, Łódź Voivodeship =

Pelagia
- Village
- Location within Poland
- Coordinates: 51°41′27″N 19°7′37″E
- Country: Poland
- Voivodeship: Łódź
- County: Łask
- Gmina: Wodzierady
- Population: 50

Pelagia [pɛˈlaɡʲa] is a village in the administrative district of Gmina Wodzierady, within Łask County, Łódź Voivodeship, in central Poland.
