= Orchów =

- Village
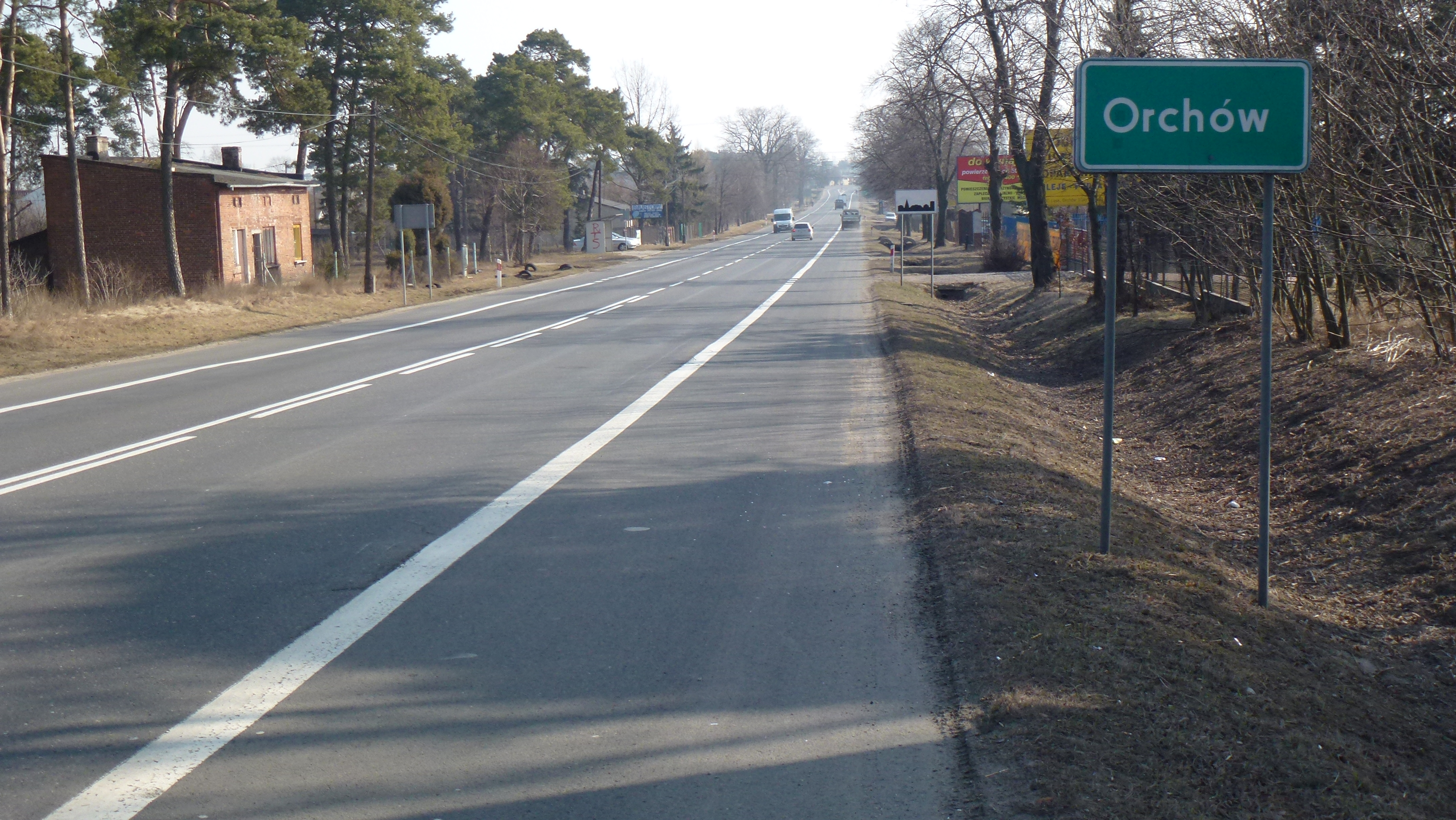

- Location within Poland
- Coordinates: 51°37′N 19°7′E
- Country: Poland
- Voivodeship: Łódź
- County: Łask
- Gmina: Łask

Orchów [ˈɔrxuf] is a village in the administrative district of Gmina Łask, within Łask County, Łódź Voivodeship, in central Poland.
