= Ochle, Łódź Voivodeship =

Ochle
- Village
- Location within Poland
- Coordinates: 51°22′22″N 18°54′35″E
- Country: Poland
- Voivodeship: Łódź
- County: Łask
- Gmina: Widawa

Ochle [ˈɔxlɛ] is a village in the administrative district of Gmina Widawa, within Łask County, Łódź Voivodeship, in central Poland.
