= Goryń, Łódź Voivodeship =

Goryń
- Village
- Location within Poland
- Coordinates: 51°23′34″N 19°1′46″E
- Country: Poland
- Voivodeship: Łódź
- County: Łask
- Gmina: Widawa

Goryń [ˈɡɔrɨɲ] is a village in the administrative district of Gmina Widawa, within Łask County, Łódź Voivodeship, in central Poland.
