= Hipolitów =

Hipolitów may refer to the following places:

- Hipolitów, Łask County in Łódź Voivodeship (central Poland)
- Hipolitów, Poddębice County in Łódź Voivodeship (central Poland)
- Hipolitów, Mińsk County in Masovian Voivodeship (east-central Poland)
- Hipolitów, Żyrardów County in Masovian Voivodeship (east-central Poland)
