= Chociw, Łask County =

Chociw
- Village
- Location within Poland
- Coordinates: 51°23′36″N 19°0′7″E
- Country: Poland
- Voivodeship: Łódź
- County: Łask
- Gmina: Widawa
- Population: 720

Chociw [ˈxɔt͡ɕif] is a village in the administrative district of Gmina Widawa, within Łask County, Łódź Voivodeship, in central Poland.
