= Ruda, Łask County =

Ruda
- Village
- Location within Poland
- Coordinates: 51°25′N 19°1′E
- Country: Poland
- Voivodeship: Łódź
- County: Łask
- Gmina: Widawa

Ruda [ˈruda] is a village in the administrative district of Gmina Widawa, within Łask County, Łódź Voivodeship, in central Poland.
