= Rembów =

Rembów may refer to the following places:

- Rembów, Łask County in Łódź Voivodeship (central Poland)
- Rembów, Sieradz County in Łódź Voivodeship (central Poland)
- Rembów, Świętokrzyskie Voivodeship (south-central Poland)
