= Zborów, Łódź Voivodeship =

Zborów
- Village
- Location within Poland
- Coordinates: 51°24′7″N 18°55′20″E
- Country: Poland
- Voivodeship: Łódź
- County: Łask
- Gmina: Widawa
- Population: 400

Zborów [ˈzbɔruf] is a village in the administrative district of Gmina Widawa, within Łask County, Łódź Voivodeship, in central Poland.
