= Gorczyn =

- Village
- Location within Poland
- Coordinates: 51°33′55″N 19°7′57″E
- Country: Poland
- Voivodeship: Łódź
- County: Łask
- Gmina: Łask

Gorczyn [ˈɡɔrt͡ʂɨn] is a village in the administrative district of Gmina Łask, within Łask County, Łódź Voivodeship, in central Poland.
