= Świerczów, Łódź Voivodeship =

Świerczów
- Village
- Location within Poland
- Coordinates: 51°27′10″N 18°54′48″E
- Country: Poland
- Voivodeship: Łódź
- County: Łask
- Gmina: Widawa

Świerczów (Polish pronunciation: [ˈɕfjɛrt͡ʂuf]) is a village in the administrative district of Gmina Widawa, within Łask County, Łódź Voivodeship, in central Poland.
