= Gucin =

Gucin may refer to the following places:

- Gucin, Łódź Voivodeship (central Poland)
- Gucin, Grójec County in Masovian Voivodeship (east-central Poland)
- Gucin, Płońsk County in Masovian Voivodeship (east-central Poland)
- Gucin, Warmian-Masurian Voivodeship (north Poland)
