= Czestków F =

- Village
- Location within Poland
- Coordinates: 51°32′15″N 19°8′47″E
- Country: Poland
- Voivodeship: Łódź
- County: Łask
- Gmina: Buczek
- Population: 170

Czestków F is a village in the administrative district of Gmina Buczek, within Łask County, Łódź Voivodeship, in central Poland.
