= Grabia Trzecia =

- Village
- Location within Poland
- Coordinates: 51°32′34″N 18°59′12″E
- Country: Poland
- Voivodeship: Łódź
- County: Łask
- Gmina: Sędziejowice
- Population: 50

Grabia Trzecia [ˈɡrabja ˈtʂɛt͡ɕa] is a village in the administrative district of Gmina Sędziejowice, within Łask County, Łódź Voivodeship, in central Poland.
