= Przymiłów =

- Village
- Location within Poland
- Coordinates: 51°32′N 19°1′E
- Country: Poland
- Voivodeship: Łódź
- County: Łask
- Gmina: Sędziejowice

Przymiłów [pʂɨˈmiwuf] is a village in the administrative district of Gmina Sędziejowice, within Łask County, Łódź Voivodeship, in central Poland.
