= Niecenia =

- Village
- Location within Poland
- Coordinates: 51°33′32″N 19°3′55″E
- Country: Poland
- Voivodeship: Łódź
- County: Łask
- Gmina: Sędziejowice

Niecenia [ɲɛˈt͡sɛɲa] is a village in the administrative district of Gmina Sędziejowice, within Łask County, Łódź Voivodeship, in central Poland.
