= Teodorów =

Teodorów may refer to the following places in Poland:

- Teodorów, Oława County in Lower Silesian Voivodeship (south-west Poland)
- Teodorów, Polkowice County in Lower Silesian Voivodeship (south-west Poland)
- Teodorów, Brzeziny County in Łódź Voivodeship (central Poland)
- Teodorów, Łask County in Łódź Voivodeship (central Poland)
- Teodorów, Gmina Będków in Łódź Voivodeship (central Poland)
- Teodorów, Gmina Budziszewice in Łódź Voivodeship (central Poland)
- Teodorów, Lublin Voivodeship (east Poland)
- Teodorów, Świętokrzyskie Voivodeship (south-central Poland)
- Teodorów, Gostynin County in Masovian Voivodeship (east-central Poland)
- Teodorów, Siedlce County in Masovian Voivodeship (east-central Poland)
- Teodorów, Wołomin County in Masovian Voivodeship (east-central Poland)
- Teodorów, Zwoleń County in Masovian Voivodeship (east-central Poland)
- Teodorów, Greater Poland Voivodeship (west-central Poland)
- Teodorów, Gmina Janów in Silesian Voivodeship (south Poland)
- Teodorów, Gmina Koniecpol in Silesian Voivodeship (south Poland)
