= Aleksandrówek, Łask County =

Aleksandrówek
- Village
- Location within Poland
- Coordinates: 51°33′50″N 19°12′5″E
- Country: Poland
- Voivodeship: Łódź
- County: Łask
- Gmina: Łask
- Population: 120

Aleksandrówek [alɛksanˈdruvɛk] is a village in the administrative district of Gmina Łask, within Łask County, Łódź Voivodeship, in central Poland.
