= Korzeń =

Korzeń may refer to the following places in Poland:

- Korzeń, Łódź Voivodeship (central Poland)
- Korzeń, Masovian Voivodeship (east-central Poland)

== See also ==
- Korzen (disambiguation)
