= Malenia, Poland =

Malenia
- Village
- Location within Poland
- Coordinates: 51°30′9″N 19°13′53″E
- Country: Poland
- Voivodeship: Łódź
- County: Łask
- Gmina: Buczek

Malenia [maˈlɛɲa] is a village in the administrative district of Gmina Buczek, within Łask County, Łódź Voivodeship, in central Poland.
