= Ostrów, Łask County =

Ostrów
- Village
- Location within Poland
- Coordinates: 51°35′4″N 19°11′20″E
- Country: Poland
- Voivodeship: Łódź
- County: Łask
- Gmina: Łask
- Population: 300

Ostrów [ˈɔstruf] is a village in the administrative district of Gmina Łask, within Łask County, Łódź Voivodeship, in central Poland.
