= Petronelów =

- Village
- Location within Poland
- Coordinates: 51°29′N 19°9′E
- Country: Poland
- Voivodeship: Łódź
- County: Łask
- Gmina: Buczek

Petronelów [pɛtrɔˈnɛluf] is a village in the administrative district of Gmina Buczek, within Łask County, Łódź Voivodeship, in central Poland.
