= Witoldów =

Witoldów may refer to the following places:

- Witoldów, Kutno County in Łódź Voivodeship (central Poland)
- Witoldów, Gmina Konstantynów, Biała County in Lublin Voivodeship (east Poland)
- Witoldów, Chełm County in Lublin Voivodeship (east Poland)
- Witoldów, Łask County in Łódź Voivodeship (central Poland)
- Witoldów, Gostynin County in Masovian Voivodeship (east-central Poland)
- Witoldów, Radom County in Masovian Voivodeship (east-central Poland)
- Witoldów, Sochaczew County in Masovian Voivodeship (east-central Poland)
- Witoldów, Greater Poland Voivodeship (west-central Poland)
