= Jesionna =

- Village
- Location within Poland
- Coordinates: 51°40′42″N 19°11′42″E
- Country: Poland
- Voivodeship: Łódź
- County: Łask
- Gmina: Wodzierady

Jesionna [jɛˈɕɔnna] is a village in the administrative district of Gmina Wodzierady, within Łask County, Łódź Voivodeship, in central Poland.
