= Kiki, Łask County =

Kiki
- Village
- Location within Poland
- Coordinates: 51°39′50″N 19°7′55″E
- Country: Poland
- Voivodeship: Łódź
- County: Łask
- Gmina: Wodzierady

Kiki [ˈkiki] is a village in the administrative district of Gmina Wodzierady, within Łask County, Łódź Voivodeship, in central Poland.
