= Wincentów, Łask County =

Wincentów
- Village
- Location within Poland
- Coordinates: 51°22′26.5″N 18°58′38.1″E
- Country: Poland
- Voivodeship: Łódź
- County: Łask
- Gmina: Widawa

Wincentów [vinˈt͡sɛntuf] is a village in the administrative district of Gmina Widawa, within Łask County, Łódź Voivodeship, in central Poland.
