= Przyborów =

Przyborów may refer to the following places in Poland:

- Przyborów, Lower Silesian Voivodeship (south-west Poland)
- Przyborów, Łask County in Łódź Voivodeship (central Poland)
- Przyborów, Radomsko County in Łódź Voivodeship (central Poland)
- Przyborów, Lesser Poland Voivodeship (south Poland)
- Przyborów, Subcarpathian Voivodeship (south-east Poland)
- Przyborów, Świętokrzyskie Voivodeship (south-central Poland)
- Przyborów, Greater Poland Voivodeship (west-central Poland)
- Przyborów, Silesian Voivodeship (south Poland)
- Przyborów, Nowa Sól County in Lubusz Voivodeship (west Poland)
- Przyborów, Sulęcin County in Lubusz Voivodeship (west Poland)
