= Mauryca =

- Village
- Location within Poland
- Coordinates: 51°33′44″N 19°9′33″E
- Country: Poland
- Voivodeship: Łódź
- County: Łask
- Gmina: Łask

Mauryca [mauˈrɨt͡sa] is a village in the administrative district of Gmina Łask, within Łask County, Łódź Voivodeship, in central Poland.
