= Las Zawadzki =

- Village
- Location within Poland
- Coordinates: 51°22′48″N 18°57′56″E
- Country: Poland
- Voivodeship: Łódź
- County: Łask
- Gmina: Widawa
- Population: 80

Las Zawadzki [ˈlas zaˈvat͡ski] is a village in the administrative district of Gmina Widawa, within Łask County, Łódź Voivodeship, in central Poland.
