= Brzeski =

Brzeski may refer to the following places in Poland:

- Brzeg County (powiat brzeski) in Opole Voivodeship (south-west Poland)
- Brzesko County (powiat brzeski) in Lesser Poland Voivodeship (south Poland)
- Brzeski, Łódź Voivodeship (central Poland)
- Brzeski, Masovian Voivodeship (east-central Poland)
