= Brodnia Górna =

Village in the administrative district of Gmina Buczek

- Village
- Location within Poland
- Coordinates: 51°32′8″N 19°11′9″E
- Country: Poland
- Voivodeship: Łódź
- County: Łask
- Gmina: Buczek

Brodnia Górna [ˈbrɔdɲa ˈɡurna] is a village in the administrative district of Gmina Buczek, within Łask County, Łódź Voivodeship, in central Poland.
