= Podgórze, Łask County =

Podgórze
- Village
- Location within Poland
- Coordinates: 51°27′11″N 18°55′59″E
- Country: Poland
- Voivodeship: Łódź
- County: Łask
- Gmina: Widawa
- Population: 130

Podgórze [pɔdˈɡuʐɛ] is a village in the administrative district of Gmina Widawa, within Łask County, Łódź Voivodeship, in central Poland.
