= Buczkowski =

Buczkowski (feminine: Buczkowska; plural: Buczkowscy) is a Polish surname. The East Slavic language spelling of the surname is Buchkovsky.

The surname may refer to:

- Bob Buczkowski (1964–2018), American football player
- Iwona Buczkowska (born 1953), French-Polish architect
- Jen Buczkowski (born 1985), American soccer player
- Krzysztof Buczkowski (born 1986), Polish speedway rider
- Leonard Buczkowski (1900–1967), Polish film director
- Małgorzata Buczkowska (born 1976), Polish film and stage actress
- Monika Buczkowska (born 1992), Polish operatic soprano

== See also ==
- Wola Buczkowska
