= Grabina, Łask County =

Grabina
- Village
- Location within Poland
- Coordinates: 51°33′44″N 19°10′4″E
- Country: Poland
- Voivodeship: Łódź
- County: Łask
- Gmina: Łask
- Population: 60

Grabina [ɡraˈbina] is a village in the administrative district of Gmina Łask, within Łask County, Łódź Voivodeship, in central Poland.
