= Łopatki =

Łopatki may refer to the following places:

- Łopatki, Wąbrzeźno County in Kuyavian-Pomeranian Voivodeship (north-central Poland)
- Łopatki, Włocławek County in Kuyavian-Pomeranian Voivodeship (north-central Poland)
- Łopatki, Łódź Voivodeship (central Poland)
- Łopatki, Lublin Voivodeship (east Poland)
