= Zabłocie, Łask County =

Zabłocie
- Village
- Location within Poland
- Coordinates: 51°23′40″N 18°52′27″E
- Country: Poland
- Voivodeship: Łódź
- County: Łask
- Gmina: Widawa

Zabłocie [zaˈbwɔt͡ɕɛ] is a village in the administrative district of Gmina Widawa, within Łask County, Łódź Voivodeship, in central Poland.
