= Wiewiórczyn, Łódź Voivodeship =

Wiewiórczyn
- Village
- Location within Poland
- Coordinates: 51°36′20″N 19°7′39″E
- Country: Poland
- Voivodeship: Łódź
- County: Łask
- Gmina: Łask
- Area: 0.556 km^{2} (0.215 sq mi)
- Elevation: 170 m (560 ft)
- Population (2015): 656
  - Density: 1,180/km^{2} (3,060/sq mi)

Wiewiórczyn [vjɛˈvjurt͡ʂɨn] is a village in the administrative district of Gmina Łask, within Łask County, Łódź Voivodeship, in central Poland.
