= Rogóźno, Łask County =

Rogóźno
- Village
- Location within Poland
- Coordinates: 51°26′5″N 18°58′42″E
- Country: Poland
- Voivodeship: Łódź
- County: Łask
- Gmina: Widawa
- Population: 420

Rogóźno [rɔˈɡuʑnɔ] is a village in the administrative district of Gmina Widawa, within Łask County, Łódź Voivodeship, in central Poland.
