= Restarzew Cmentarny =

- Village
- Location within Poland
- Coordinates: 51°21′45″N 19°2′0″E
- Country: Poland
- Voivodeship: Łódź
- County: Łask
- Gmina: Widawa
- Population: 200

Restarzew Cmentarny [rɛsˈtaʐɛf t͡smɛnˈtarnɨ] is a village in the administrative district of Gmina Widawa, within Łask County, Łódź Voivodeship, in central Poland.
