= Czestków-Osiedle =

Village in Gmina Buczek, Poland

- Village
- Location within Poland
- Coordinates: 51°32′23″N 19°08′20″E
- Country: Poland
- Voivodeship: Łódź
- County: Łask
- Gmina: Buczek
- Population: 290

Czestków-Osiedle [ˈt͡ʂɛstkuf ɔˈɕɛdlɛ] is a village in the administrative district of Gmina Buczek, within Łask County, Łódź Voivodeship, in central Poland.
