= Dobra, Łask County =

Dobra
- Village
- Location within Poland
- Coordinates: 51°31′22″N 19°3′44″E
- Country: Poland
- Voivodeship: Łódź
- County: Łask
- Gmina: Sędziejowice

Dobra [ˈdɔbra] is a village in the administrative district of Gmina Sędziejowice, within Łask County, Łódź Voivodeship, in central Poland.
