= Okup Wielki =

- Village
- Location within Poland
- Coordinates: 51°35′35.38″N 19°3′30.92″E
- Country: Poland
- Voivodeship: Łódź
- County: Łask
- Gmina: Łask

Okup Wielki (Polish pronunciation: [ˈɔkup ˈfjɛlkʲi]) is a village in the administrative district of Gmina Łask, within Łask County, Łódź Voivodeship, in central Poland.
