= Brzyków =

Brzyków may refer to the following places in Poland:

- Brzyków, Lower Silesian Voivodeship (south-west Poland)
- Brzyków, Łódź Voivodeship (central Poland)
