= Zawady =

Zawady may refer to:

- Zawady, Białystok
- Zawady, Poznań
- Zawady, Warsaw
- Zawady, Kalisz County in Greater Poland Voivodeship (west-central Poland)
- Zawady, Oborniki County in Greater Poland Voivodeship (west-central Poland)
- Zawady, Ostrzeszów County in Greater Poland Voivodeship (west-central Poland)
- Zawady, Pleszew County in Greater Poland Voivodeship (west-central Poland)
- Zawady, Rawicz County in Greater Poland Voivodeship (west-central Poland)
- Zawady, Bełchatów County in Łódź Voivodeship (central Poland)
- Zawady, Brzeziny County in Łódź Voivodeship (central Poland)
- Zawady, Kutno County in Łódź Voivodeship (central Poland)
- Zawady, Łask County in Łódź Voivodeship (central Poland)
- Zawady, Łowicz County in Łódź Voivodeship (central Poland)
- Zawady, Poddębice County in Łódź Voivodeship (central Poland)
- Zawady, Rawa County in Łódź Voivodeship (central Poland)
- Zawady, Sieradz County in Łódź Voivodeship (central Poland)
- Zawady, Skierniewice County in Łódź Voivodeship (central Poland)
- Zawady, Gmina Rzeczyca in Łódź Voivodeship (central Poland)
- Zawady, Lublin Voivodeship (east Poland)
- Zawady, Grójec County in Masovian Voivodeship (east-central Poland)
- Zawady, Gmina Dzierzgowo in Masovian Voivodeship (east-central Poland)
- Zawady, Gmina Lipowiec Kościelny in Masovian Voivodeship (east-central Poland)
- Zawady, Gmina Baranowo in Masovian Voivodeship (east-central Poland)
- Zawady, Gmina Troszyn in Masovian Voivodeship (east-central Poland)
- Zawady, Płońsk County in Masovian Voivodeship (east-central Poland)
- Zawady, Przysucha County in Masovian Voivodeship (east-central Poland)
- Zawady, Gmina Przesmyki in Masovian Voivodeship (east-central Poland)
- Zawady, Gmina Zbuczyn in Masovian Voivodeship (east-central Poland)
- Zawady, Gmina Ceranów in Masovian Voivodeship (east-central Poland)
- Zawady, Gmina Repki in Masovian Voivodeship (east-central Poland)
- Zawady, Warsaw West County in Masovian Voivodeship (east-central Poland)
- Zawady, Węgrów County in Masovian Voivodeship (east-central Poland)
- Zawady, Wołomin County in Masovian Voivodeship (east-central Poland)
- Zawady, Gmina Turośń Kościelna in Podlaskie Voivodeship (north-east Poland)
- Zawady, Gmina Zawady in Podlaskie Voivodeship (north-east Poland)
- Zawady, Bielsk County in Podlaskie Voivodeship (north-east Poland)
- Zawady, Łomża County in Podlaskie Voivodeship (north-east Poland)
- Zawady, Silesian Voivodeship (south Poland)
- Zawady, Gołdap County in Warmian-Masurian Voivodeship (north Poland)
- Zawady, Nidzica County in Warmian-Masurian Voivodeship (north Poland)
- Zawady, Olsztyn County in Warmian-Masurian Voivodeship (north Poland)
- Zawady, Pisz County in Warmian-Masurian Voivodeship (north Poland)
