= Patoki =

Patoki may refer to the following places:

- Patoki, Łask County in Łódź Voivodeship (central Poland)
- Patoki, Łowicz County in Łódź Voivodeship (central Poland)
- Patoki, Podlaskie Voivodeship (north-east Poland)
- Patoki, Pomeranian Voivodeship (north Poland)
