= Wola Bachorska =

- Village
- Location within Poland
- Coordinates: 51°30′6″N 19°12′50″E
- Country: Poland
- Voivodeship: Łódź
- County: Łask
- Gmina: Buczek

Wola Bachorska [ˈvɔla baˈxɔrska] is a village in the administrative district of Gmina Buczek, within Łask County, Łódź Voivodeship, in central Poland.
