= Józefatów, Łask County =

Józefatów
- Village
- Location within Poland
- Coordinates: 51°28′45″N 19°11′15″E
- Country: Poland
- Voivodeship: Łódź
- County: Łask
- Gmina: Buczek
- Elevation: 190 m (620 ft)

Józefatów [juzɛˈfatuf] is a village in the administrative district of Gmina Buczek, within Łask County, Łódź Voivodeship, in central Poland.
