= Wielka Wieś B =

- Village
- Location within Poland
- Coordinates: 51°26′11″N 18°51′06″E
- Country: Poland
- Voivodeship: Łódź
- County: Łask
- Gmina: Widawa

Wielka Wieś B is a village in the administrative district of Gmina Widawa, within Łask County, Łódź Voivodeship, in central Poland.
