= Kustrzyce =

- Village
- Location within Poland
- Coordinates: 51°33′N 19°2′E
- Country: Poland
- Voivodeship: Łódź
- County: Łask
- Gmina: Sędziejowice
- Population: 250

Kustrzyce [kusˈtʂɨt͡sɛ] is a village in the administrative district of Gmina Sędziejowice, within Łask County, Łódź Voivodeship, in central Poland.
