= Wrząsawa =

- Village
- Location within Poland
- Coordinates: 51°45′N 19°5′E
- Country: Poland
- Voivodeship: Łódź
- County: Łask
- Gmina: Wodzierady

Wrząsawa [vʐɔ̃ˈsava] is a village in the administrative district of Gmina Wodzierady, within Łask County, Łódź Voivodeship, in central Poland.
