= Izydorów =

- Village
- Location within Poland
- Coordinates: 51°27′N 18°52′E
- Country: Poland
- Voivodeship: Łódź
- County: Łask
- Gmina: Widawa

Izydorów [izɨˈdɔruf] is a village in the administrative district of Gmina Widawa, within Łask County, Łódź Voivodeship, in central Poland.
