= Grabno =

Grabno may refer to the following places:

In Poland:

- Grabno, Lesser Poland Voivodeship (south Poland)
- Grabno, Łódź Voivodeship (central Poland)
- Grabno, Lubusz Voivodeship (west Poland)
- Grabno, Pomeranian Voivodeship (north Poland)
- Grabno, Warmian-Masurian Voivodeship (north Poland)
- Grabno, Szczecinek County in West Pomeranian Voivodeship (north-west Poland)
- Grabno, Świdwin County in West Pomeranian Voivodeship (north-west Poland)

In Slovenia:

- Gradno, a settlement in the Municipality of Brda (known as Grabno until 1952)
