= Wola Stryjewska =

- Village
- Location within Poland
- Coordinates: 51°37′29″N 19°5′45″E
- Country: Poland
- Voivodeship: Łódź
- County: Łask
- Gmina: Łask

Wola Stryjewska [ˈvɔla strɨˈjɛfska] is a village in the administrative district of Gmina Łask, within Łask County, Łódź Voivodeship, in central Poland.
