= Mauryców, Łask County =

Mauryców
- Village
- Location within Poland
- Coordinates: 51°39′49″N 19°10′8″E
- Country: Poland
- Voivodeship: Łódź
- County: Łask
- Gmina: Wodzierady

Mauryców [mauˈrɨt͡suf] is a village in the administrative district of Gmina Wodzierady, within Łask County, Łódź Voivodeship, in central Poland.
