= Wandzin =

Wandzin may refer to:

- Wandzin, Łódź Voivodeship, central Poland
- Wandzin, Lubartów County, in Lublin Voivodeship, east Poland
- Wandzin, Lublin County, in Lublin Voivodeship, east Poland
- Wandzin, Gmina Ulhówek, Tomaszów County, in Lublin Voivodeship, east Poland
- Wandzin, Podlaskie Voivodeship, north-east Poland
- Wandzin, Człuchów County, in Pomeranian Voivodeship, north Poland
