= Magnusy =

- Village
- Location within Poland
- Coordinates: 51°44′40″N 19°3′28″E
- Country: Poland
- Voivodeship: Łódź
- County: Łask
- Gmina: Wodzierady

Magnusy [maɡˈnusɨ] is a village in the administrative district of Gmina Wodzierady, within Łask County, Łódź Voivodeship, in central Poland.
