= Kąty, Łask County =

Kąty
- Village
- Location within Poland
- Coordinates: 51°24′45″N 18°54′24″E
- Country: Poland
- Voivodeship: Łódź
- County: Łask
- Gmina: Widawa

Kąty [ˈkɔntɨ] is a village in the administrative district of Gmina Widawa, within Łask County, Łódź Voivodeship, in central Poland.
