= Grzeszyn =

Grzeszyn may refer to the following places in Poland:

- Grzeszyn, Lower Silesian Voivodeship (south-west Poland)
- Grzeszyn, Łódź Voivodeship (central Poland)
