= Sędziejowice-Kolonia =

- Village
- Location within Poland
- Coordinates: 51°30′41″N 19°0′15″E
- Country: Poland
- Voivodeship: Łódź
- County: Łask
- Gmina: Sędziejowice

Sędziejowice-Kolonia [sɛnd͡ʑɛjɔˈvit͡sɛ kɔˈlɔɲa] is a village in the administrative district of Gmina Sędziejowice, within Łask County, Łódź Voivodeship, in central Poland.
