= Nowe Wrzeszczewice =

- Village
- Location within Poland
- Coordinates: 51°40′59″N 19°5′53″E
- Country: Poland
- Voivodeship: Łódź
- County: Łask
- Gmina: Łask

Nowe Wrzeszczewice [ˈnɔvɛ vʐɛʂt͡ʂɛˈvit͡sɛ] is a village in the administrative district of Gmina Łask, within Łask County, Łódź Voivodeship, in central Poland.
