= Restarzew Środkowy =

- Village
- Location within Poland
- Coordinates: 51°22′N 19°2′E
- Country: Poland
- Voivodeship: Łódź
- County: Łask
- Gmina: Widawa

Restarzew Środkowy [rɛsˈtaʐɛf ɕrɔtˈkɔvɨ] is a village in the administrative district of Gmina Widawa, within Łask County, Łódź Voivodeship, in central Poland.
