= Górki Grabińskie =

- Village
- Location within Poland
- Coordinates: 51°28′7″N 18°57′13″E
- Country: Poland
- Voivodeship: Łódź
- County: Łask
- Gmina: Widawa

Górki Grabińskie [ˈɡurki ɡraˈbiɲskʲɛ] is a village in the administrative district of Gmina Widawa, within Łask County, Łódź Voivodeship, in central Poland.
