= Wielka Wieś A =

- Village
- Location within Poland
- Coordinates: 51°26′23″N 18°51′12″E
- Country: Poland
- Voivodeship: Łódź
- County: Łask
- Gmina: Widawa

Wielka Wieś A is a village in the administrative district of Gmina Widawa, within Łask County, Łódź Voivodeship, in central Poland.
