= Marzenin, Łódź Voivodeship =

Marzenin
- Village
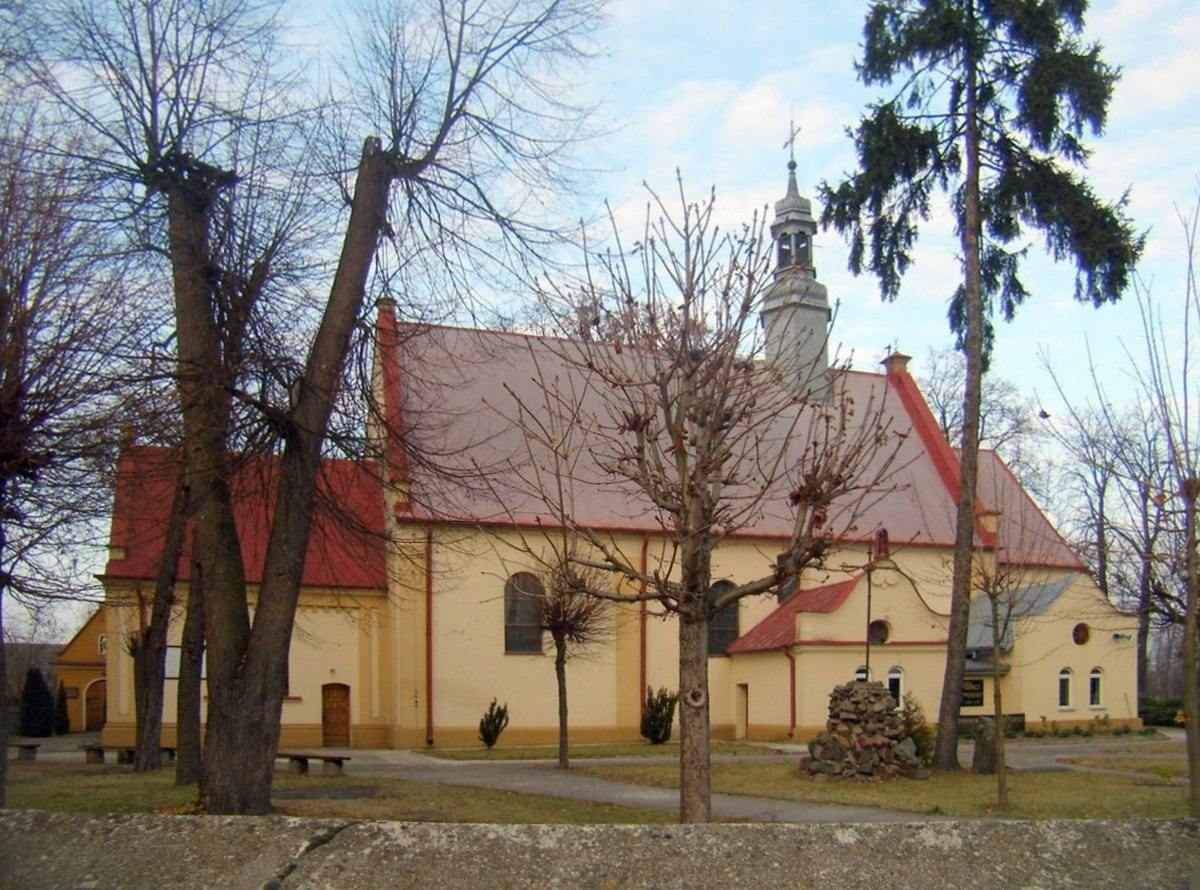
- Church of the Assumption of the Virgin Mary

- Location within Poland
- Coordinates: 51°33′19″N 19°1′55″E
- Country: Poland
- Voivodeship: Łódź
- County: Łask
- Gmina: Sędziejowice

Population
  - Total: 580

Marzenin [maˈʐɛnin] is a village in the administrative district of Gmina Sędziejowice, within Łask County, Łódź Voivodeship, in central Poland.
