= Gucin, Łódź Voivodeship =

Gucin
- Village
- Location within Poland
- Coordinates: 51°32′50″N 19°14′26″E
- Country: Poland
- Voivodeship: Łódź
- County: Łask
- Gmina: Buczek

Gucin [ˈɡut͡ɕin] is a village in the administrative district of Gmina Buczek, within Łask County, Łódź Voivodeship, in central Poland.
