= Łazów, Łask County =

Łazów
- Village
- Location within Poland
- Coordinates: 51°22′53″N 19°0′34″E
- Country: Poland
- Voivodeship: Łódź
- County: Łask
- Gmina: Widawa

Łazów [ˈwazuf] is a village in the administrative district of Gmina Widawa, within Łask County, Łódź Voivodeship, in central Poland.
