= Czarny Las, Łask County =

Czarny Las
- Village
- Location within Poland
- Coordinates: 51°29′39″N 19°13′38″E
- Country: Poland
- Voivodeship: Łódź
- County: Łask
- Gmina: Buczek
- Population: 80

Czarny Las [ˈt͡ʂarnɨ ˈlas] is a village in the administrative district of Gmina Buczek, within Łask County, Łódź Voivodeship, in central Poland.
