= Brzyków, Łódź Voivodeship =

Brzyków
- Village
- Location within Poland
- Coordinates: 51°24′54″N 18°51′55″E
- Country: Poland
- Voivodeship: Łódź
- County: Łask
- Gmina: Widawa

Brzyków [ˈbʐɨkuf] is a village in the administrative district of Gmina Widawa, within Łask County, Łódź Voivodeship, in central Poland.

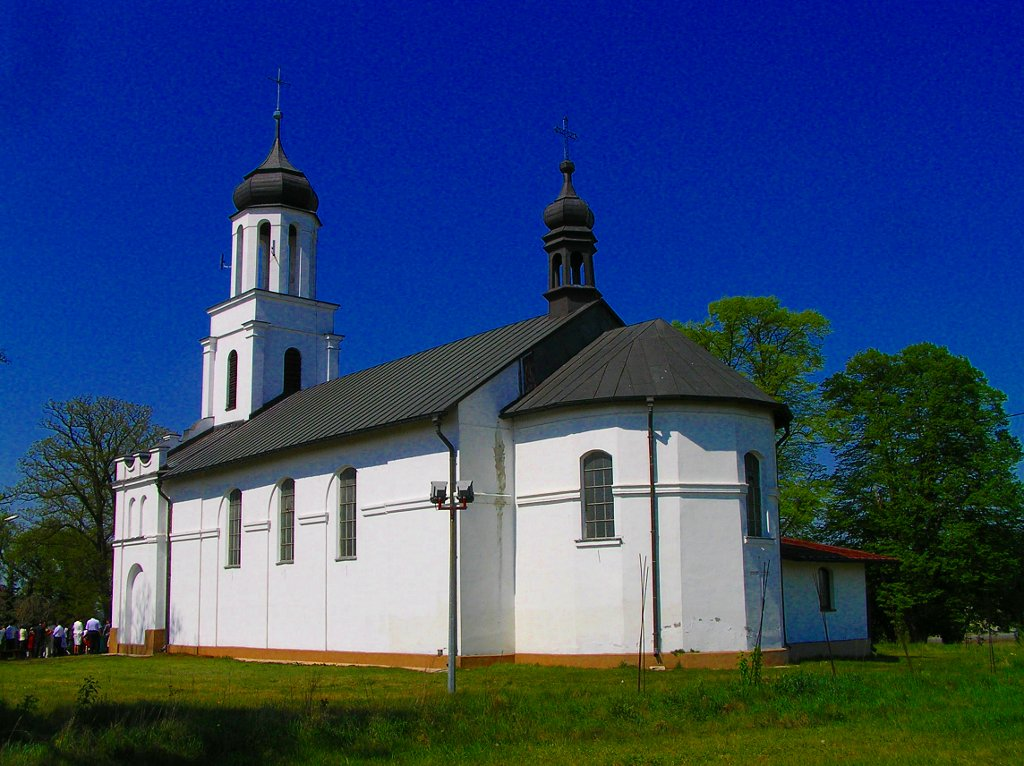
Church in Brzyków was built in 1860 - 1872
