= Wandzin, Łódź Voivodeship =

Wandzin
- Village
- Location within Poland
- Coordinates: 51°45′31″N 19°8′9″E
- Country: Poland
- Voivodeship: Łódź
- County: Łask
- Gmina: Wodzierady

Wandzin [ˈvand͡ʑin] is a village in the administrative district of Gmina Wodzierady, within Łask County, Łódź Voivodeship, in central Poland.
