= Dąbrowa Widawska =

- Village
- Location within Poland
- Coordinates: 51°26′N 18°54′E
- Country: Poland
- Voivodeship: Łódź
- County: Łask
- Gmina: Widawa

Dąbrowa Widawska [dɔmˈbrɔva viˈdafska] is a village in the administrative district of Gmina Widawa, within Łask County, Łódź Voivodeship, in central Poland.
