= Przyborów, Łask County =

Przyborów
- Village
- Location within Poland
- Coordinates: 51°21′34″N 18°58′56″E
- Country: Poland
- Voivodeship: Łódź
- County: Łask
- Gmina: Widawa
- Population: 50

Przyborów [pʂɨˈbɔruf] is a village in the administrative district of Gmina Widawa, within Łask County, Łódź Voivodeship, in central Poland.
