= Wilkowyja, Łask County =

Wilkowyja
- Village
- Location within Poland
- Coordinates: 51°31′58″N 19°10′22″E
- Country: Poland
- Voivodeship: Łódź
- County: Łask
- Gmina: Buczek

Wilkowyja [vilkɔˈvɨja] is a village in the administrative district of Gmina Buczek, within Łask County, Łódź Voivodeship, in central Poland.
