= Siedlce, Łódź Voivodeship =

Siedlce
- Village
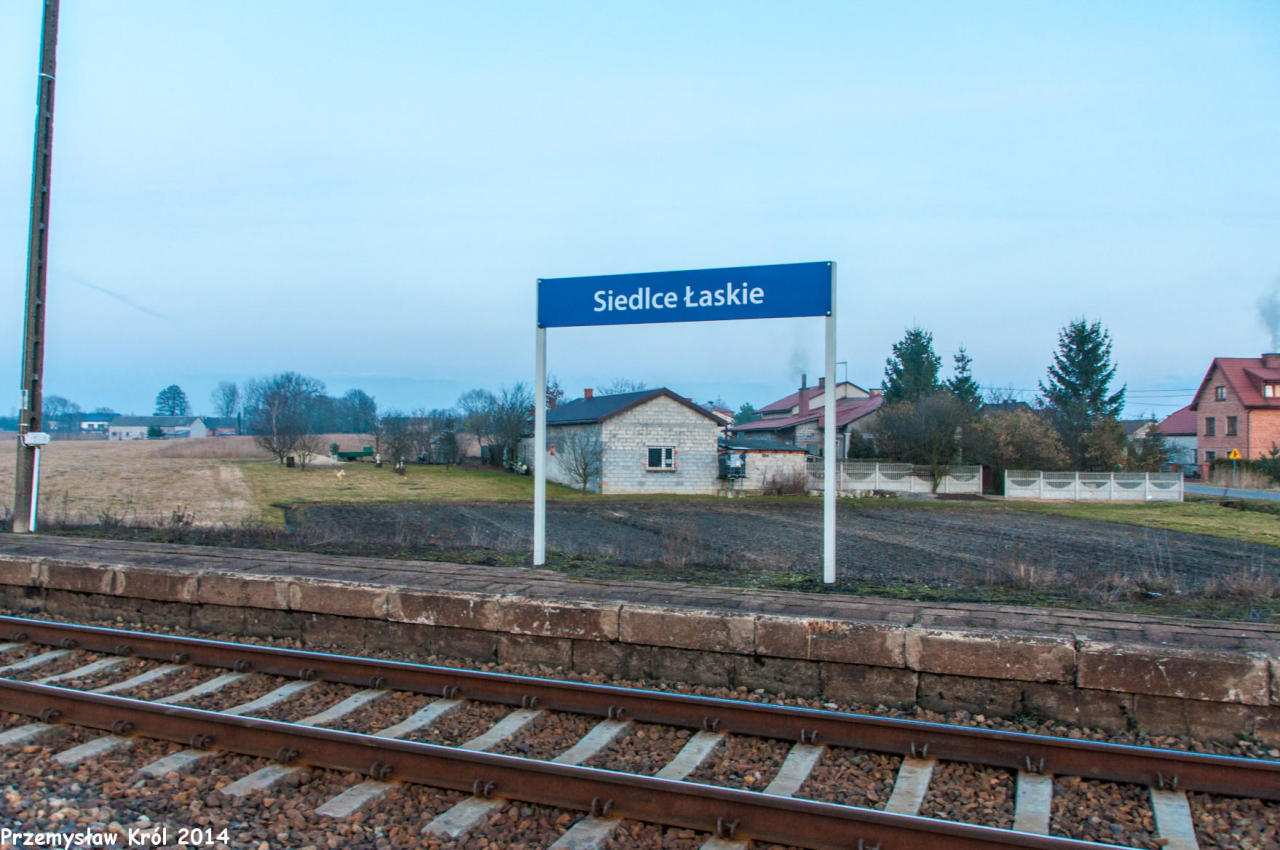
- Siedlce Łaskie train station

- Location within Poland
- Coordinates: 51°27′27″N 19°1′15″E
- Country: Poland
- Voivodeship: Łódź
- County: Łask
- Gmina: Sędziejowice
- Time zone: UTC+1 (CET)
  - Summer (DST): UTC+2 (CEST)
- Vehicle registration: ELA

Siedlce [ˈɕɛdlt͡sɛ] is a village in the administrative district of Gmina Sędziejowice, within Łask County, Łódź Voivodeship, in central Poland.
