= Brzeski, Łódź Voivodeship =

Brzeski
- Village
- Location within Poland
- Coordinates: 51°31′19″N 18°57′25″E
- Country: Poland
- Voivodeship: Łódź
- County: Łask
- Gmina: Sędziejowice

Brzeski [ˈbʐɛski] is a village in the administrative district of Gmina Sędziejowice, within Łask County, Łódź Voivodeship, in central Poland.
