= Witoldów, Łask County =

Witoldów
- Village
- Location within Poland
- Coordinates: 51°25′25″N 18°53′54″E
- Country: Poland
- Voivodeship: Łódź
- County: Łask
- Gmina: Widawa

Witoldów (Polish pronunciation: [viˈtɔlduf]) is a village in the administrative district of Gmina Widawa, within Łask County, Łódź Voivodeship, in central Poland.
