= Piorunów, Łódź Voivodeship =

Piorunów
- Village
- Location within Poland
- Coordinates: 51°45′34″N 19°4′13″E
- Country: Poland
- Voivodeship: Łódź
- County: Łask
- Gmina: Wodzierady

Piorunów [pjɔˈrunuf] is a village in the administrative district of Gmina Wodzierady, within Łask County, Łódź Voivodeship, in central Poland.
