= Lucjanów, Łask County =

Lucjanów
- Village
- Location within Poland
- Coordinates: 51°22′16″N 18°58′54″E
- Country: Poland
- Voivodeship: Łódź
- County: Łask
- Gmina: Widawa
- Population: 30

Lucjanów [lut͡sˈjanuf] is a village in the administrative district of Gmina Widawa, within Łask County, Łódź Voivodeship, in central Poland.
