= Kwiatkowice, Łódź Voivodeship =

Kwiatkowice
- Village
- Location within Poland
- Coordinates: 51°44′N 19°7′E
- Country: Poland
- Voivodeship: Łódź
- County: Łask
- Gmina: Wodzierady
- Elevation: 150 m (490 ft)
- Population: 440

Kwiatkowice ([kfjatkɔˈvit͡sɛ]) is a village in the administrative district of Gmina Wodzierady, within Łask County, Łódź Voivodeship, in central Poland.
