= Teodorów, Łask County =

Teodorów
- Village
- Location within Poland
- Coordinates: 51°42′15″N 19°10′2″E
- Country: Poland
- Voivodeship: Łódź
- County: Łask
- Gmina: Wodzierady
- Population: 30

Teodorów [tɛɔˈdɔruf] is a village in the administrative district of Gmina Wodzierady, within Łask County, Łódź Voivodeship, in central Poland.
