= Korzen =

Korzen may refer to:

== Surname ==
- Annie Korzen (born in 1938), American actress and writer
- Benni Korzen (born in 1938), Danish producer

== Places ==
- Korzeń (disambiguation)
