= Kocina, Łódź Voivodeship =

Kocina
- Village
- Location within Poland
- Coordinates: 51°24′57″N 18°52′43″E
- Country: Poland
- Voivodeship: Łódź
- County: Łask
- Gmina: Widawa

Kocina [kɔˈt͡ɕina] is a village in the administrative district of Gmina Widawa, within Łask County, Łódź Voivodeship, in central Poland.
