= Alfonsów, Łask County =

Alfonsów
- Village
- Location within Poland
- Coordinates: 51°43′11″N 19°9′51″E
- Country: Poland
- Voivodeship: Łódź
- County: Łask
- Gmina: Wodzierady
- Population: 40

Alfonsów [alˈfɔnsuf] is a village in the administrative district of Gmina Wodzierady, within Łask County, Łódź Voivodeship, in central Poland.
