= Grabno, Łódź Voivodeship =

Grabno
- Village
- Location within Poland
- Coordinates: 51°27′30″N 18°58′46″E
- Country: Poland
- Voivodeship: Łódź
- County: Łask
- Gmina: Sędziejowice

Grabno [ˈɡrabnɔ] is a village in the administrative district of Gmina Sędziejowice, within Łask County, Łódź Voivodeship, in central Poland. Its climate is very humid all year long.
