= Rembów, Łask County =

Rembów
- Village
- Location within Poland
- Coordinates: 51°39′5″N 19°10′7″E
- Country: Poland
- Voivodeship: Łódź
- County: Łask
- Gmina: Łask

Rembów [ˈrɛmbuf] is a village in the administrative district of Gmina Łask, within Łask County, Łódź Voivodeship, in central Poland.
