= Chrząstawa, Łódź Voivodeship =

Chrząstawa
- Village
- Location within Poland
- Coordinates: 51°24′N 19°3′E
- Country: Poland
- Voivodeship: Łódź
- County: Łask
- Gmina: Widawa

Chrząstawa [xʂɔ̃sˈtava] is a village in the administrative district of Gmina Widawa, within Łask County, Łódź Voivodeship, in central Poland.
