= Korzeń, Łódź Voivodeship =

Korzeń
- Village
- Location within Poland
- Coordinates: 51°29′11″N 18°52′16″E
- Country: Poland
- Voivodeship: Łódź
- County: Łask
- Gmina: Widawa

Korzeń (Polish pronunciation: [ˈkɔʐɛj̃]) is a village in the administrative district of Gmina Widawa, within Łask County, Łódź Voivodeship, in central Poland.
