= Józefów Widawski =

- Village
- Location within Poland
- Coordinates: 51°25′56″N 19°02′02″E
- Country: Poland
- Voivodeship: Łódź
- County: Łask
- Gmina: Widawa

Józefów Widawski (Polish pronunciation: [juˈzɛfuv viˈdafskʲi]) is a village in the administrative district of Gmina Widawa, within Łask County, Łódź Voivodeship, in central Poland.
