= Zawady, Łask County =

Zawady
- Village
- Location within Poland
- Coordinates: 51°23′56″N 18°57′20″E
- Country: Poland
- Voivodeship: Łódź
- County: Łask
- Gmina: Widawa
- Population (approx.): 200

Zawady [zaˈvadɨ] is a village in the administrative district of Gmina Widawa, within Łask County, Łódź Voivodeship, in central Poland.

The village has an approximate population of 200.
