= Grzeszyn, Łódź Voivodeship =

Grzeszyn
- Village
- Location within Poland
- Coordinates: 51°31′43″N 19°15′2″E
- Country: Poland
- Voivodeship: Łódź
- County: Łask
- Gmina: Buczek

Grzeszyn [ˈɡʐɛʂɨn] is a village in the administrative district of Gmina Buczek, within Łask County, Łódź Voivodeship, in central Poland.
