= Patoki, Łask County =

Patoki
- Village
- Location within Poland
- Coordinates: 51°26′27″N 19°3′6″E
- Country: Poland
- Voivodeship: Łódź
- County: Łask
- Gmina: Widawa

Patoki [paˈtɔki] is a village in the administrative district of Gmina Widawa, within Łask County, Łódź Voivodeship, in central Poland.
