= Gmina Wodzierady =

Gmina Wodzierady Wodzierady Commune
- Gmina
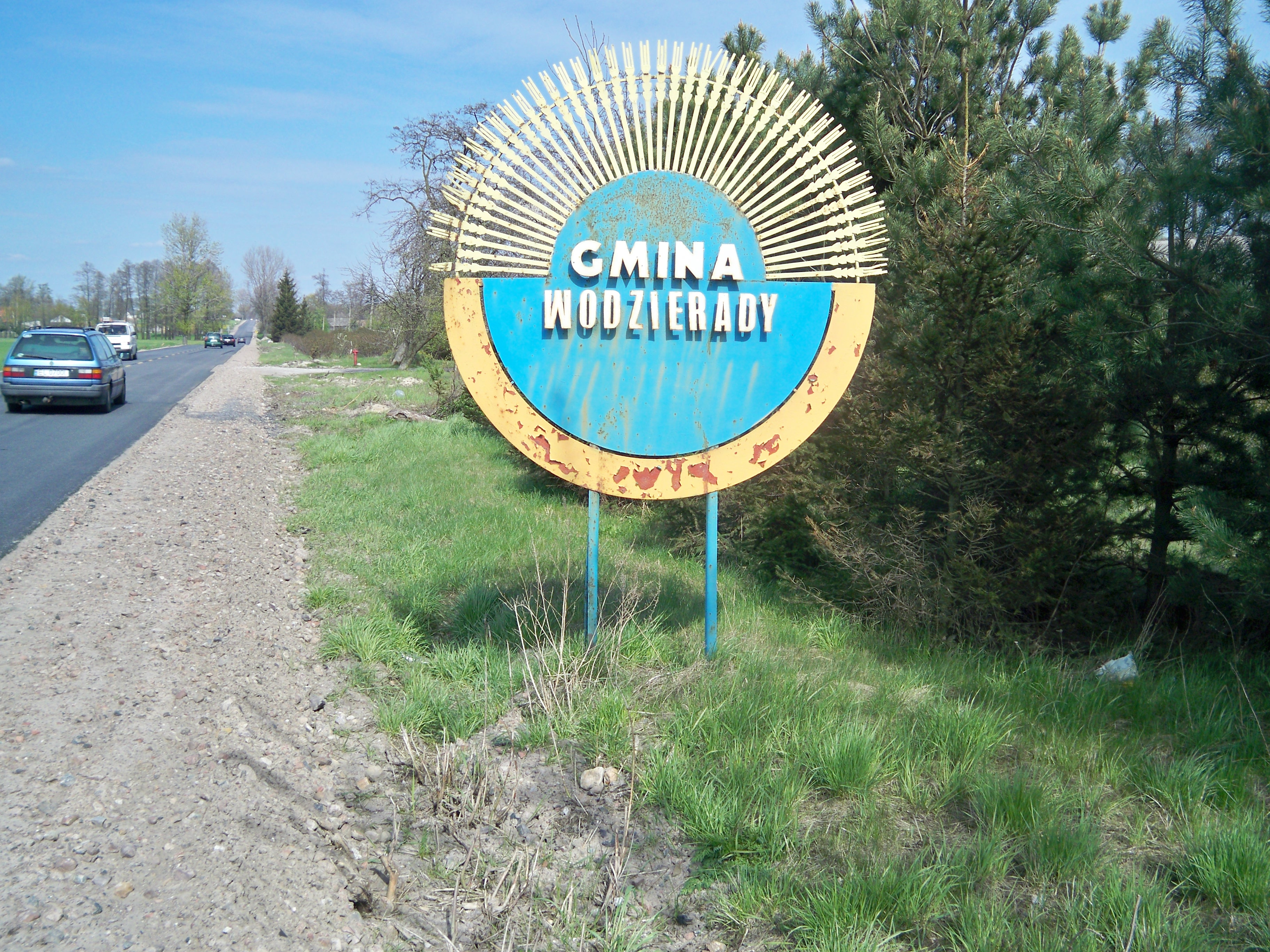
- Interactive map of Gmina Wodzierady
- Coordinates (Wodzierady): 51°43′N 19°9′E
- Country: Poland
- Voivodeship: Łódź
- County: Łask
- Seat: Wodzierady

Area
  - Total: 81.42 km^{2} (31.44 sq mi)

Population (2006)
  - Total: 3,098
  - Density: 38.05/km^{2} (98.55/sq mi)
- Car plates: ELA
- Website: www.wodzierady.pl

Gmina Wodzierady is a rural gmina (administrative district) in Łask County, Łódź Voivodeship, in central Poland. Its seat is the village of Wodzierady, which lies approximately 15 kilometres (9 mi) north of Łask and 24 km (15 mi) west of the regional capital Łódź.

The gmina covers an area of 81.42 square kilometres (31.4 sq mi), and as of 2006 its total population is 3,098.

== Villages ==
Gmina Wodzierady contains the villages and settlements of:

- Alfonsów
- Chorzeszów
- Czarnysz
- Dobków
- Dobruchów
- Hipolitów
- Jesionna
- Józefów
- Kiki
- Kwiatkowice
- Kwiatkowice-Kolonia
- Leśnica
- Ludowinka
- Magdalenów
- Magnusy
- Mauryców
- Pelagia
- Piorunów
- Piorunówek
- Przyrownica
- Stanisławów
- Teodorów
- Wandzin
- Włodzimierz
- Wodzierady
- Wola Czarnyska
- Wrząsawa
- Zalesie

== Neighbouring gminas ==
Gmina Wodzierady is bordered by the gminas of Dobroń, Łask, Lutomiersk, Pabianice, Szadek and Zadzim.
