= Wodzierady =

- Village
- Location within Poland
- Coordinates: 51°43′N 19°9′E
- Country: Poland
- Voivodeship: Łódź
- County: Łask
- Gmina: Wodzierady

Wodzierady [vɔd͡ʑɛˈradɨ] is a village in Łask County, Łódź Voivodeship, in central Poland. It is the seat of the gmina (administrative district) called Gmina Wodzierady.
