= Battle of Sędziejowice =

Battle in the January Uprising in Russia in 1863

- Part of the January Uprising
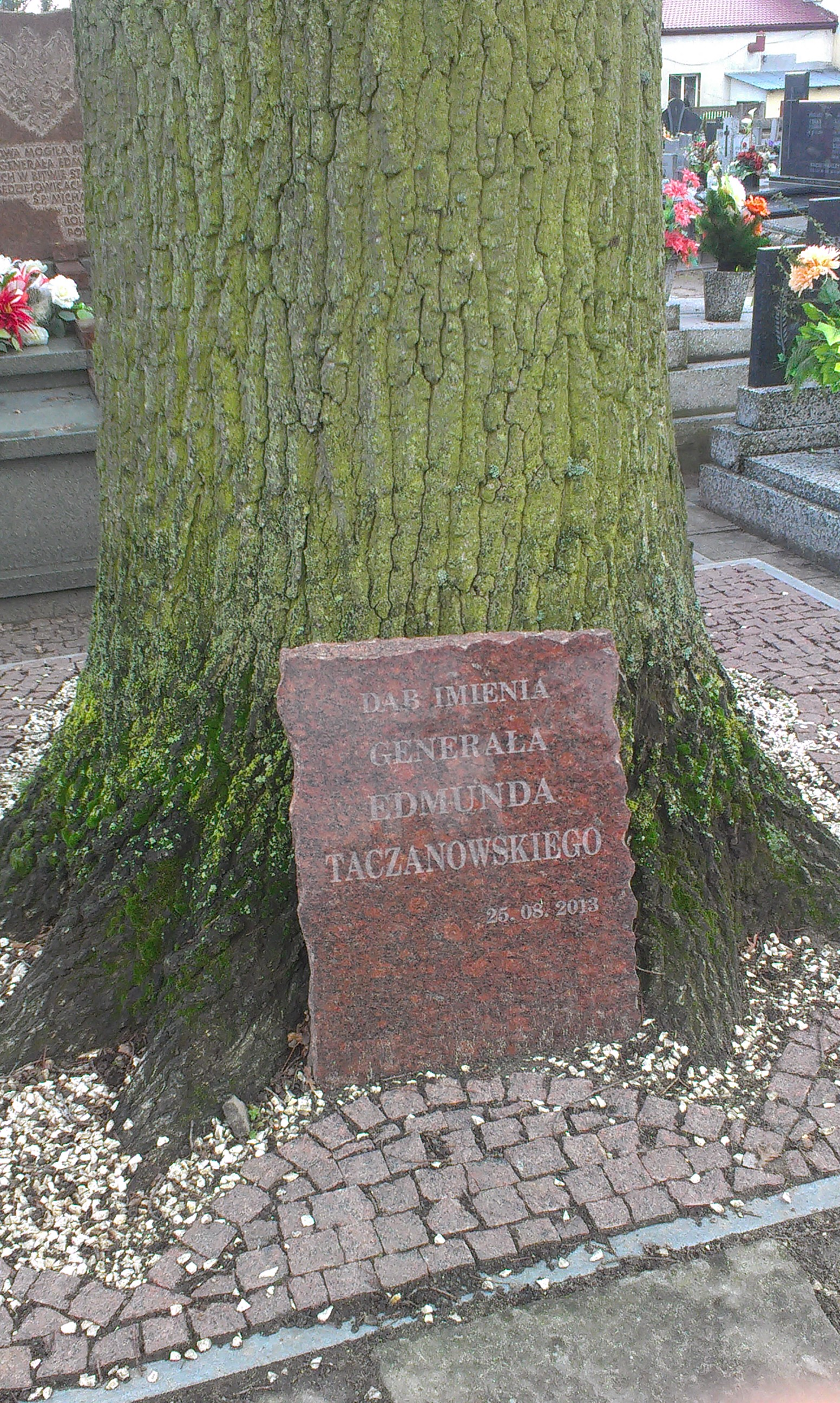
- Memorial to General Edmund Taczanowski in Sędziejowice
Date	26 August 1863
Location	Sędziejowice
Result	Polish victory

Belligerents
(Poland) Polish insurgents	Russian Empire

Commanders and leaders
Edmund Taczanowski	Alexander Pavlovich von Grabbe (POW) (DOW)

Strength
1,500	

The Battle of Sędziejowice, one of many clashes of the January Uprising, took place on 26 August 1863 near the village of Sędziejowice, which at that time belonged to Russian-controlled Congress Poland. A party of 1,500 Polish insurgents, commanded by Edmund Taczanowski, clashed with soldiers of the Imperial Russian Army, commanded by rittmeister von Grabbe. The battle resulted in Polish victory.

In early September 1863, an insurgent party of Taczanowski camped near Sędziejowice. When the Russians found out about this, they decided to send there Grodno Hussars under Rittmeister von Grabbe, supported by Don Cossacks. It is unknown how many Russian soldiers were engaged in the clash, as almost all of them were killed. A few survivors, including von Grabbe himself, were captured by the insurgents.

Following the battle, strong Russian forces concentrated between Częstochowa and Łódź, ready to prevent any insurgent movements.

== Sources ==
- Stefan Kieniewicz: Powstanie styczniowe. Warszawa: Państwowe Wydawnictwo Naukowe, 1983. ISBN 83-01-03652-4.
