= Wydrzyn, Łask County =

Wydrzyn
- Village
- Location within Poland
- Coordinates: 51°37′9″N 19°7′12″E
- Country: Poland
- Voivodeship: Łódź
- County: Łask
- Gmina: Łask
- Elevation: 185 m (607 ft)
- Population: 315

Wydrzyn [ˈvɨdʐɨn] is a village in the administrative district of Gmina Łask, within Łask County, Łódź Voivodeship, in central Poland.
