= Dobków, Łódź Voivodeship =

Dobków
- Village
- Location within Poland
- Coordinates: 51°42′13″N 19°6′51″E
- Country: Poland
- Voivodeship: Łódź
- County: Łask
- Gmina: Wodzierady

Dobków [ˈdɔpkuf] is a village in the administrative district of Gmina Wodzierady, within Łask County, Łódź Voivodeship, in central Poland.
