= Dębina, Łask County =

Dębina
- Village
- Location within Poland
- Coordinates: 51°26′22″N 18°54′19″E
- Country: Poland
- Voivodeship: Łódź
- County: Łask
- Gmina: Widawa

Dębina [dɛmˈbina] is a village in the administrative district of Gmina Widawa, within Łask County, Łódź Voivodeship, in central Poland.
