= Gmina Łask =

Gmina Łask Łask Commune
- Gmina

- Coat of arms
- Interactive map of Gmina Łask
- Coordinates (Łask): 51°35′N 19°8′E
- Country: Poland
- Voivodeship: Łódź
- County: Łask
- Seat: Łask

Area
  - Total: 146.91 km^{2} (56.72 sq mi)

Population (2006)
  - Total: 28,406
  - Density: 193.36/km^{2} (500.79/sq mi)
  - Urban: 18,684
  - Rural: 9,722
- Car plates: ELA
- Website: www.lask.pl

Gmina Łask is an urban-rural gmina (administrative district) in Łask County, Łódź Voivodeship, in central Poland. Its seat is the town of Łask, which lies approximately 32 kilometres (20 mi) south-west of the regional capital Łódź.

The gmina covers an area of 146.91 square kilometres (56.7 sq mi), and as of 2006 its total population is 28,406 (out of which the population of Łask amounts to 18,684, and the population of the rural part of the gmina is 9,722).

== Villages ==
Apart from the town of Łask, Gmina Łask contains the villages and settlements of:

- Aleksandrówek
- Anielin
- Bałucz
- Borszewice
- Budy Stryjewskie
- Gorczyn
- Grabina
- Karszew
- Krzucz
- Łopatki
- Mauryca
- Nowe Wrzeszczewice
- Okup Mały
- Okup Wielki
- Orchów
- Ostrów
- Rembów
- Remiszew
- Rokitnica
- Sięganów
- Stryje Księże
- Stryje Paskowe
- Teodory
- Wiewiórczyn
- Wola Bałucka
- Wola Łaska
- Wola Stryjewska
- Wronowice
- Wrzeszczewice
- Wydrzyn
- Zielęcice

== Neighbouring gminas ==
Gmina Łask is bordered by the gminas of Buczek, Dobroń, Lutomiersk, Sędziejowice, Szadek, Wodzierady, Zduńska Wola and Zelów.
