= Sędziejowice, Łódź Voivodeship =

Sędziejowice
- Village
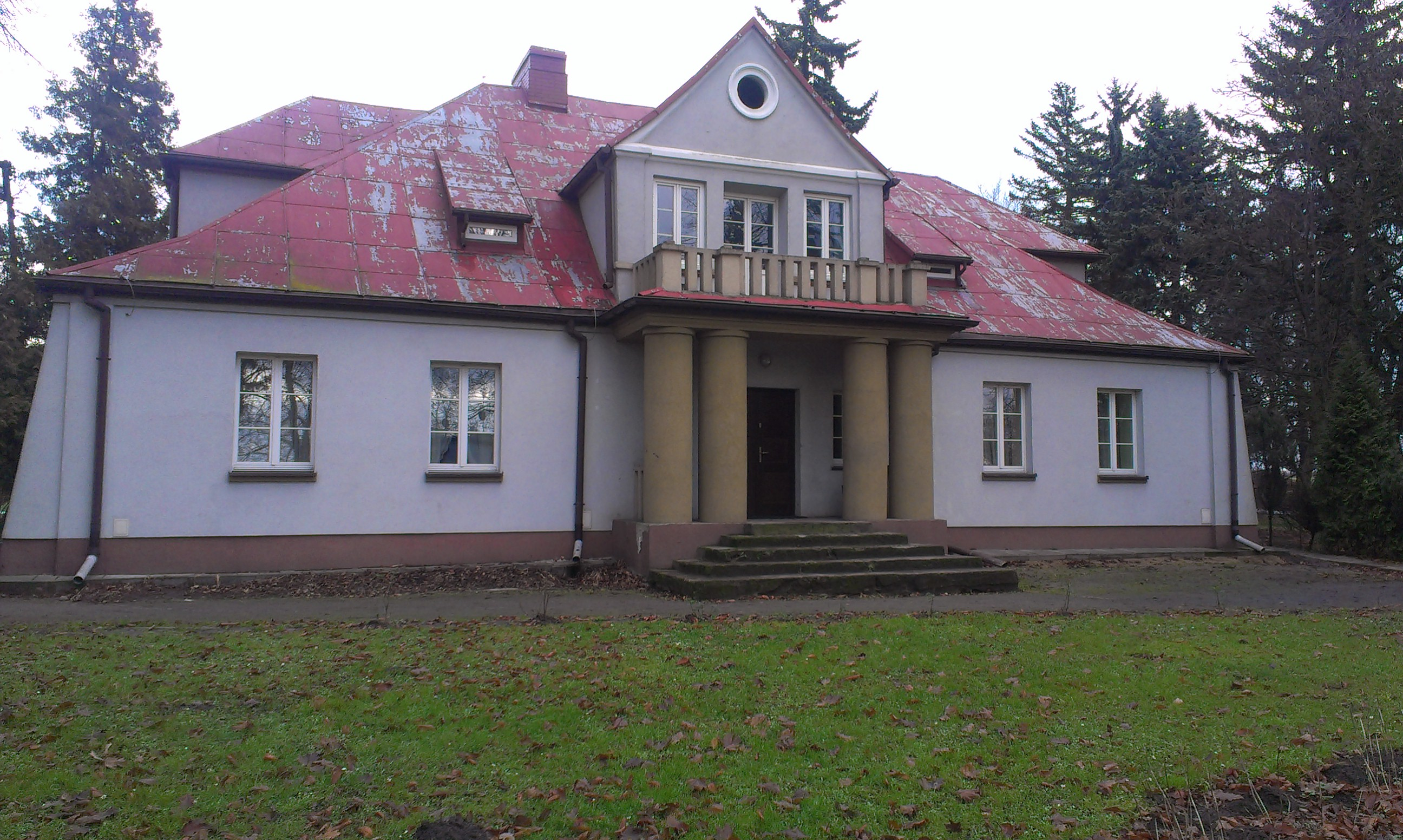
- Old manor house in Sędziejowice

- Location within Poland
- Coordinates: 51°31′N 19°2′E
- Country: Poland
- Voivodeship: Łódź
- County: Łask
- Gmina: Sędziejowice
- Population (approx.): 840
- Time zone: UTC+1 (CET)
  - Summer (DST): UTC+2 (CEST)
- Vehicle registration: ELA

Sędziejowice [sɛnd͡ʑɛjɔˈvit͡sɛ] is a village in Łask County, Łódź Voivodeship, in central Poland. It is the seat of the gmina (administrative district) called Gmina Sędziejowice.

During the January Uprising, on August 26, 1863, it was the site of the Battle of Sędziejowice, in which Polish insurgents led by General Edmund Taczanowski defeated Russian troops. From 1939 to 1945, the village was incorporated into the Third Reich, and after the war the village was once again incorporated into Poland.
