= Gmina Buczek =

Gmina Buczek Buczek Commune
- Gmina

- Coat of arms
- Interactive map of Gmina Buczek
- Coordinates (Buczek): 51°30′N 19°10′E
- Country: Poland
- Voivodeship: Łódź
- County: Łask
- Seat: Buczek

Area
  - Total: 90.84 km^{2} (35.07 sq mi)

Population (2006)
  - Total: 4,893
  - Density: 53.86/km^{2} (139.5/sq mi)
- Car plates: ELA
- Website: www.buczek.org.pl

Gmina Buczek is a rural gmina (administrative district) in Łask County, Łódź Voivodeship, in central Poland. Its seat is the village of Buczek, which lies approximately 10 kilometres (6 mi) south of Łask and 38 km (24 mi) south-west of the regional capital Łódź.

The gmina covers an area of 90.84 square kilometres (35.1 sq mi), and as of 2006 its total population is 4,893.

== Villages ==
Gmina Buczek contains the villages and settlements of:

- Bachorzyn
- Brodnia Dolna
- Brodnia Górna
- Buczek
- Czarny Las
- Czestków A
- Czestków B
- Czestków F
- Czestków-Osiedle
- Dąbrowa
- Dąbrówka
- Grzeszyn
- Gucin
- Herbertów
- Józefatów
- Kowalew
- Luciejów
- Malenia
- Petronelów
- Sowińce
- Strupiny
- Sycanów
- Wilkowyja
- Wola Bachorska
- Wola Buczkowska

== Neighbouring gminas ==
Gmina Buczek is bordered by the gminas of Łask, Sędziejowice and Zelów.
