= Hipolitów, Łask County =

Hipolitów
- Village
- Location within Poland
- Coordinates: 51°40′26″N 19°9′40″E
- Country: Poland
- Voivodeship: Łódź
- County: Łask
- Gmina: Wodzierady

Hipolitów [xipɔˈlituf] is a village in the administrative district of Gmina Wodzierady, within Łask County, Łódź Voivodeship, in central Poland.
