= Kwiatkowice-Kolonia =

- Village
- Location within Poland
- Coordinates: 51°44′33″N 19°6′41″E
- Country: Poland
- Voivodeship: Łódź
- County: Łask
- Gmina: Wodzierady
- Population: 150

Kwiatkowice-Kolonia [kfjatkɔˈvit͡sɛ kɔˈlɔɲa] is a village in the administrative district of Gmina Wodzierady, within Łask County, Łódź Voivodeship, in central Poland.
