= Buczek, Łask County =

Buczek
- Village
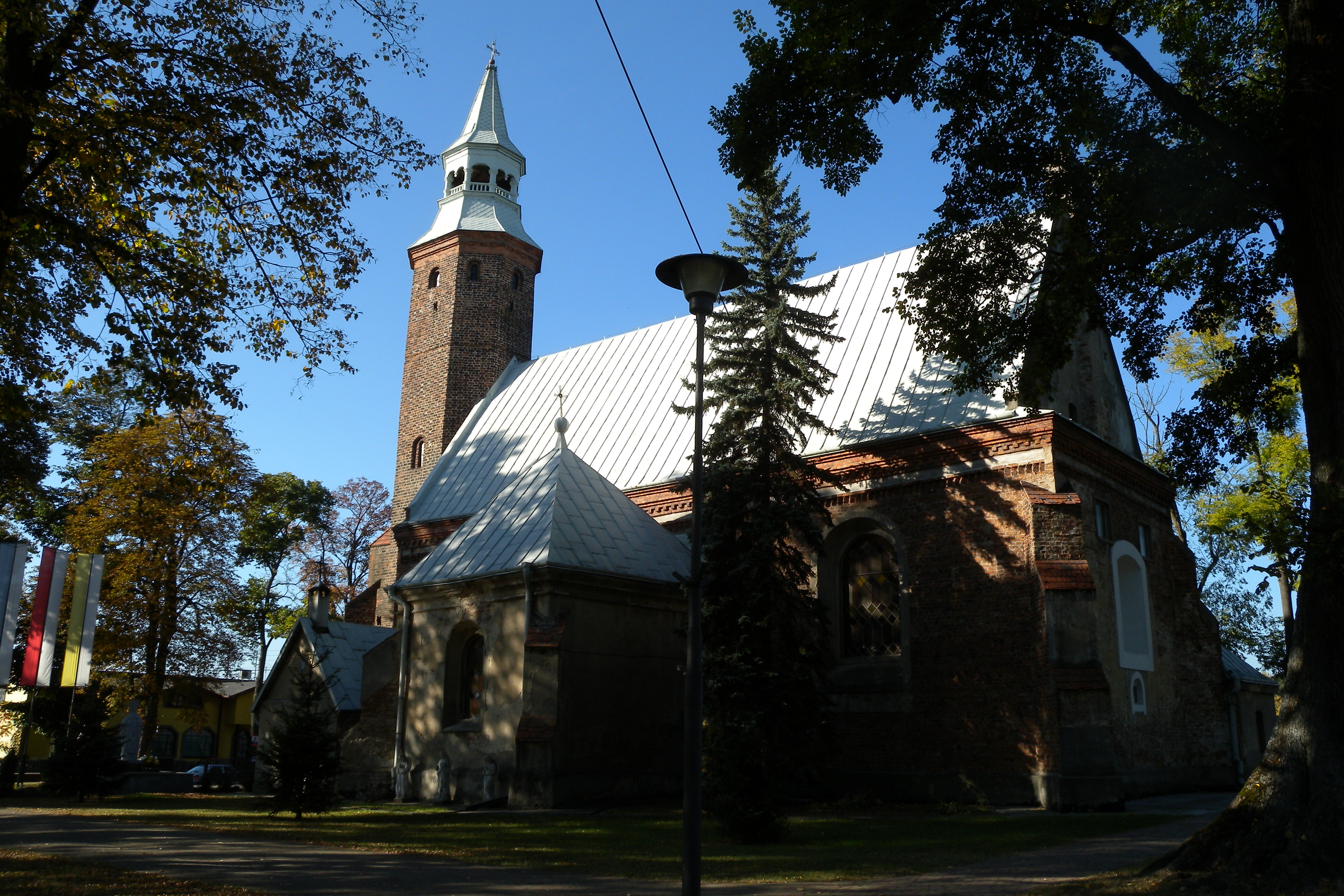
- St. John the Baptist church

- Coat of arms

- Location within Poland
- Coordinates: 51°30′N 19°10′E
- Country: Poland
- Voivodeship: Łódź
- County: Łask
- Gmina: Buczek

Government
  - Mayor: Bronisław Węglewski

Area
  - Total: 92.2 km^{2} (35.6 sq mi)

Population
  - Total: 980
  - Density: 11/km^{2} (28/sq mi)
- Postal Code: 98-113
- Area code: (+48) 43
- Vehicle registration: ELA
- Website: www.buczek.org.pl

Buczek [ˈbut͡ʂɛk] is a village in Łask County, Łódź Voivodeship, in central Poland. It is the seat of the gmina (administrative district) called Gmina Buczek. It is located in the Sieradz Land.

== History ==
The oldest mention concerning Buczek dates back to 1354. When, according to the chronicler, Jan Długosz, archbishop of Gniezno bestowed tithe upon a parish in Pabianice from the village of Kociszew located nearby the village of Buczek. There is a record from 1391 about Mikołaj "de Buczek", the rector of the church, and from 1394 - about the towns of Buczkowo and Buczkowicze. In 1412 one of the Łaskis had a lawsuit with Mikołaj, parson from Buczek, over a mill. In 1441 Buczek belonged to Poźdżenice estate. Another mention of Buczek is from 1466- then Jan from Kozuby bequeathed eight grzywnas (not a big sum at that time) to his wife Dorota from Buczek. In one of the later documents from 1483, the Puczeks from Buczek are mentioned. Initially, the village belonged to the Buczkowskis or the Buczeks of the Bogoria coat of arms, later to the Gomulińskis of the Jelita coat of arms from Gomulin. Thanks to the endeavours of the representatives of this family (they performed many state functions in the land of Sieradz till the end of 16th century), king Sigismund I the Old bestowed municipal rights upon this place. It was a private town, administratively located in the Szadek County in the Sieradz Voivodeship in the Greater Poland Province of the Kingdom of Poland.

The coat of arms of Buczek comes from the family emblem of the towns' owners - the Buczkowskis (they used Bogoria coat of arms). Buczek's coat of arms represents two arrows, pointing away from each other, on the red background. In the middle, there is a white letter ‘B’ that stands for the first letter in the name of Buczek. Over the letter, there is a yellow crown with a black border and on both sides of the letter, there are two orange ribbons with a black border and two black crossed lines. This coat of arms was officially bestowed upon the place on 20 March 1991 pursuant to the resolution of Buczek District Council. Buczek kept its municipal status till the second half of 17th century. Despite the fact that it is still called a town in 1759, in the 1780s Buczek is clearly referred to as a village.

== Transport ==
Buczek lies on the intersection of vovoideship roads 484 and 483.

The nearest railway station is in Łask.
