= Gmina Widawa =

Gmina Widawa Widawa Commune
- Gmina

- Coat of arms
- Interactive map of Gmina Widawa
- Coordinates (Widawa): 51°26′14″N 18°56′21″E
- Country: Poland
- Voivodeship: Łódź
- County: Łask
- Seat: Widawa

Area
  - Total: 178.04 km^{2} (68.74 sq mi)

Population (2006)
  - Total: 7,954
  - Density: 44.68/km^{2} (115.7/sq mi)
- Car plates: ELA
- Website: www.widawa.finn.pl

Gmina Widawa is a rural gmina (administrative district) in Łask County, Łódź Voivodeship, in central Poland. Its seat is the village of Widawa, which lies approximately 22 kilometres (14 mi) south-west of Łask and 53 km (33 mi) south-west of the regional capital Łódź.

The gmina covers an area of 178.04 square kilometres (68.7 sq mi), and as of 2006 its total population is 7,954.

The gmina contains part of the protected area called Warta-Widawka Landscape Park.

== Villages ==
Gmina Widawa contains the villages and settlements of:

- Brzyków
- Chociw
- Chrusty
- Chrząstawa
- Dąbrowa Widawska
- Dębina
- Górki Grabińskie
- Goryń
- Grabówie
- Izydorów
- Józefów Widawski
- Kąty
- Klęcz
- Kocina
- Kolonia Zawady
- Korzeń
- Las Zawadzki
- Łazów
- Ligota
- Lucjanów
- Ochle
- Ochle-Kolonia
- Osieczno
- Patoki
- Podgórze
- Przyborów
- Raczynów
- Restarzew Cmentarny
- Restarzew Środkowy
- Rogóźno
- Ruda
- Sarnów
- Sewerynów
- Siemiechów
- Świerczów
- Widawa
- Wielka Wieś A
- Wielka Wieś B
- Wincentów
- Witoldów
- Wola Kleszczowa
- Zabłocie
- Zawady
- Zborów

== Neighbouring gminas ==
Gmina Widawa is bordered by the gminas of Burzenin, Konopnica, Rusiec, Sędziejowice, Szczerców, Zapolice and Zelów.
