= Gmina Sędziejowice =

Gmina Sędziejowice Sędziejowice Commune
- Gmina
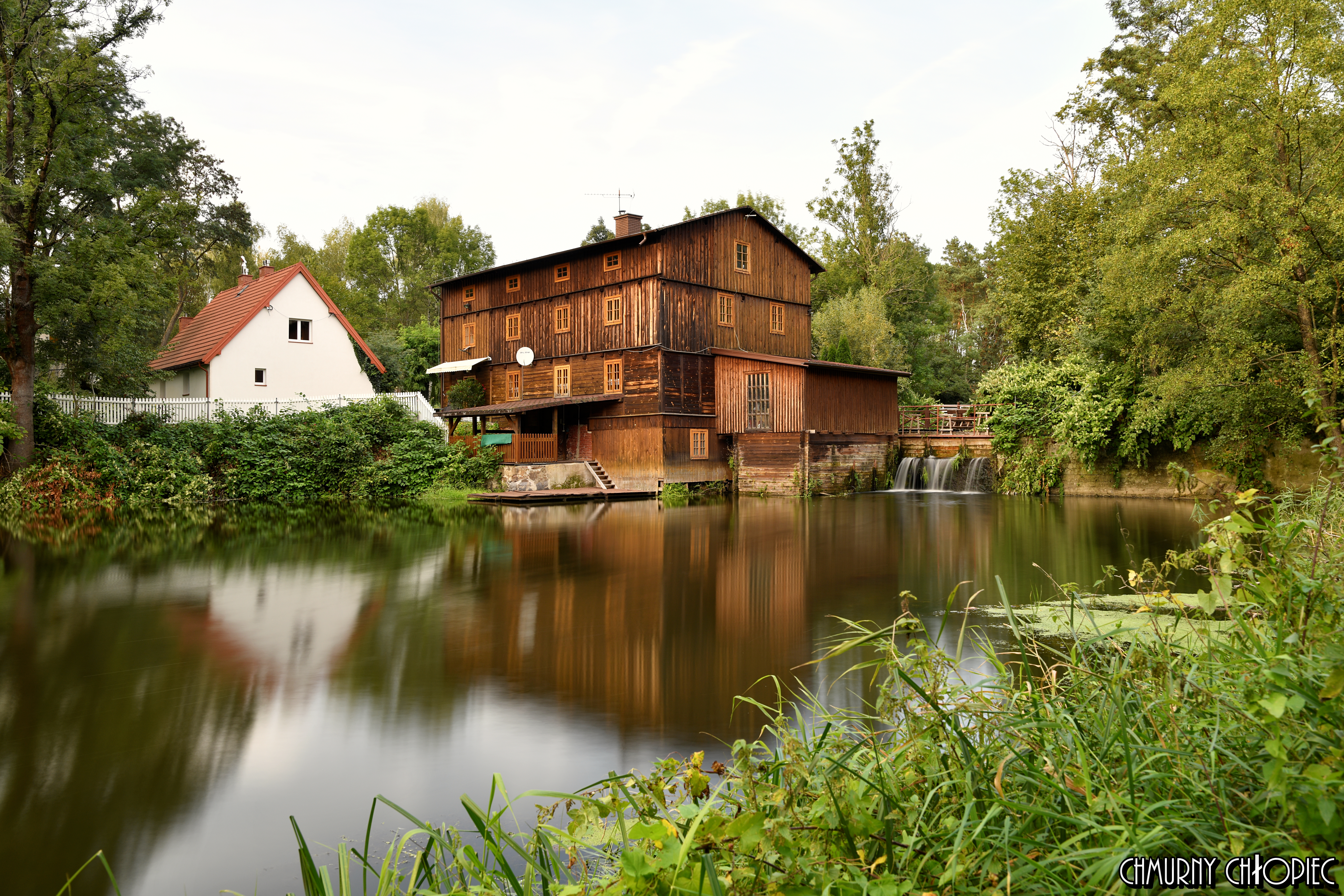

- Flag Coat of arms
- Interactive map of Gmina Sędziejowice
- Coordinates (Sędziejowice): 51°31′N 19°2′E
- Country: Poland
- Voivodeship: Łódź
- County: Łask
- Seat: Sędziejowice

Area
  - Total: 120.17 km^{2} (46.40 sq mi)

Population (2006)
  - Total: 6,523
  - Density: 54.28/km^{2} (140.6/sq mi)
- Car plates: ELA
- Website: gminasedziejowice.eu

Gmina Sędziejowice is a rural gmina (administrative district) in Łask County, Łódź Voivodeship, in central Poland. Its seat is the village of Sędziejowice, which lies approximately 11 kilometres (7 mi) south-west of Łask and 43 km (27 mi) south-west of the regional capital Łódź.

The gmina covers an area of 120.17 square kilometres (46.4 sq mi), and as of 2006 its total population is 6,523.

== Villages ==
Gmina Sędziejowice contains the villages and settlements of:

- Bilew
- Brody
- Brzeski
- Dobra
- Grabia
- Grabia Trzecia
- Grabica
- Grabno
- Kamostek
- Korczyska
- Kustrzyce
- Lichawa
- Marzenin
- Niecenia
- Nowe Kozuby
- Osiny
- Podule
- Pruszków
- Przymiłów
- Rososza
- Sędziejowice
- Sędziejowice-Kolonia
- Siedlce
- Sobiepany
- Stare Kozuby
- Wola Marzeńska
- Wola Wężykowa
- Wrzesiny
- Żagliny
- Zamość

== Neighbouring gminas ==
Gmina Sędziejowice is bordered by the gminas of Buczek, Łask, Widawa, Zapolice, Zduńska Wola and Zelów.
