= Widawa, Łódź Voivodeship =

Widawa
- Village
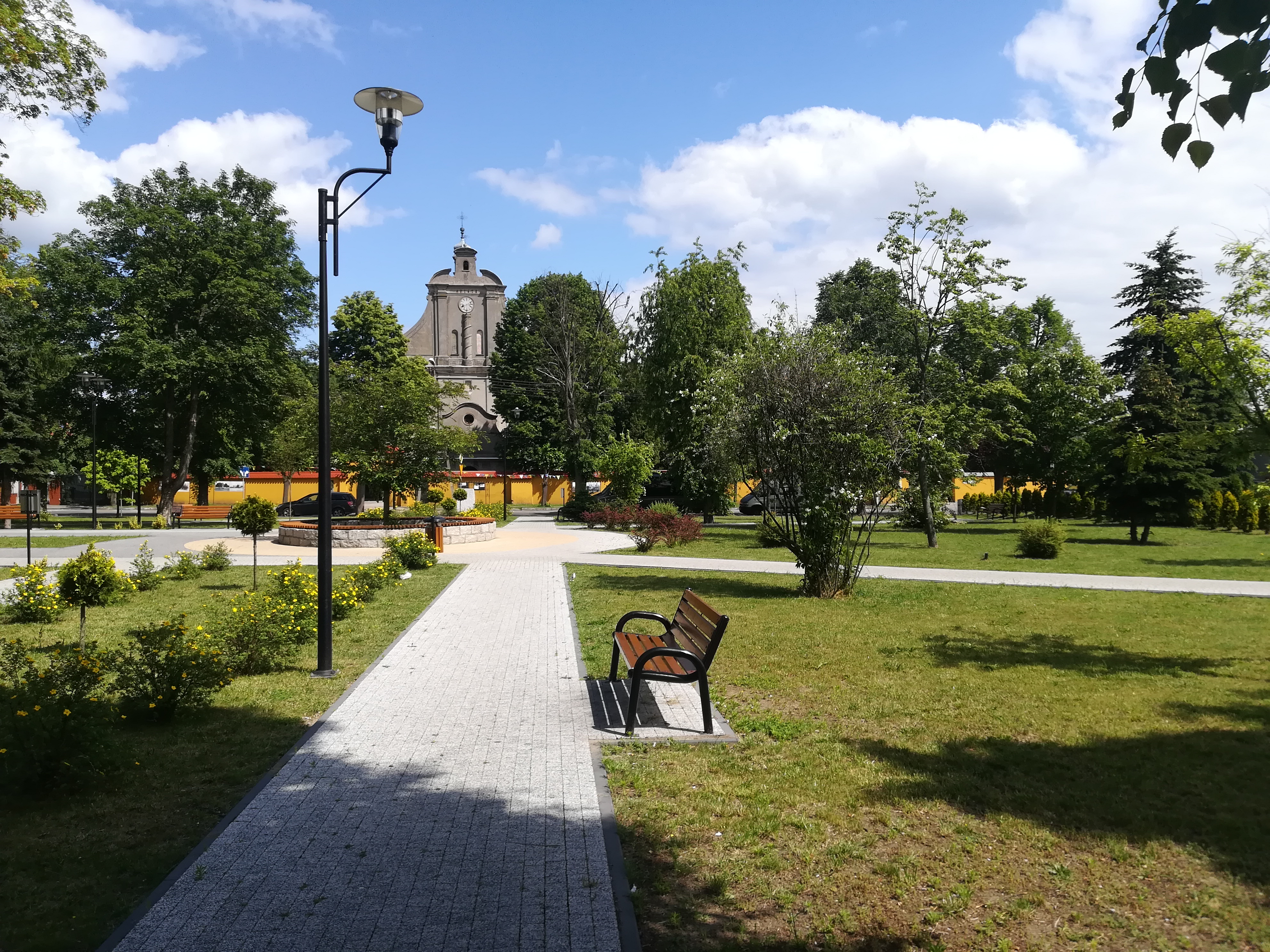
- Market square with the church of the Exaltation of the Holy Cross in the background

- Location within Poland
- Coordinates: 51°26′14″N 18°56′21″E
- Country: Poland
- Voivodeship: Łódź
- County: Łask
- Gmina: Widawa

Population
  - Total: 1,300
- Time zone: UTC+1 (CET)
  - Summer (DST): UTC+2 (CEST)
- Vehicle registration: ELA

Widawa [viˈdava] is a village in Łask County, Łódź Voivodeship, in central Poland. It is the seat of the gmina (administrative district) called Gmina Widawa. It is located in the Sieradz Land.

== History ==
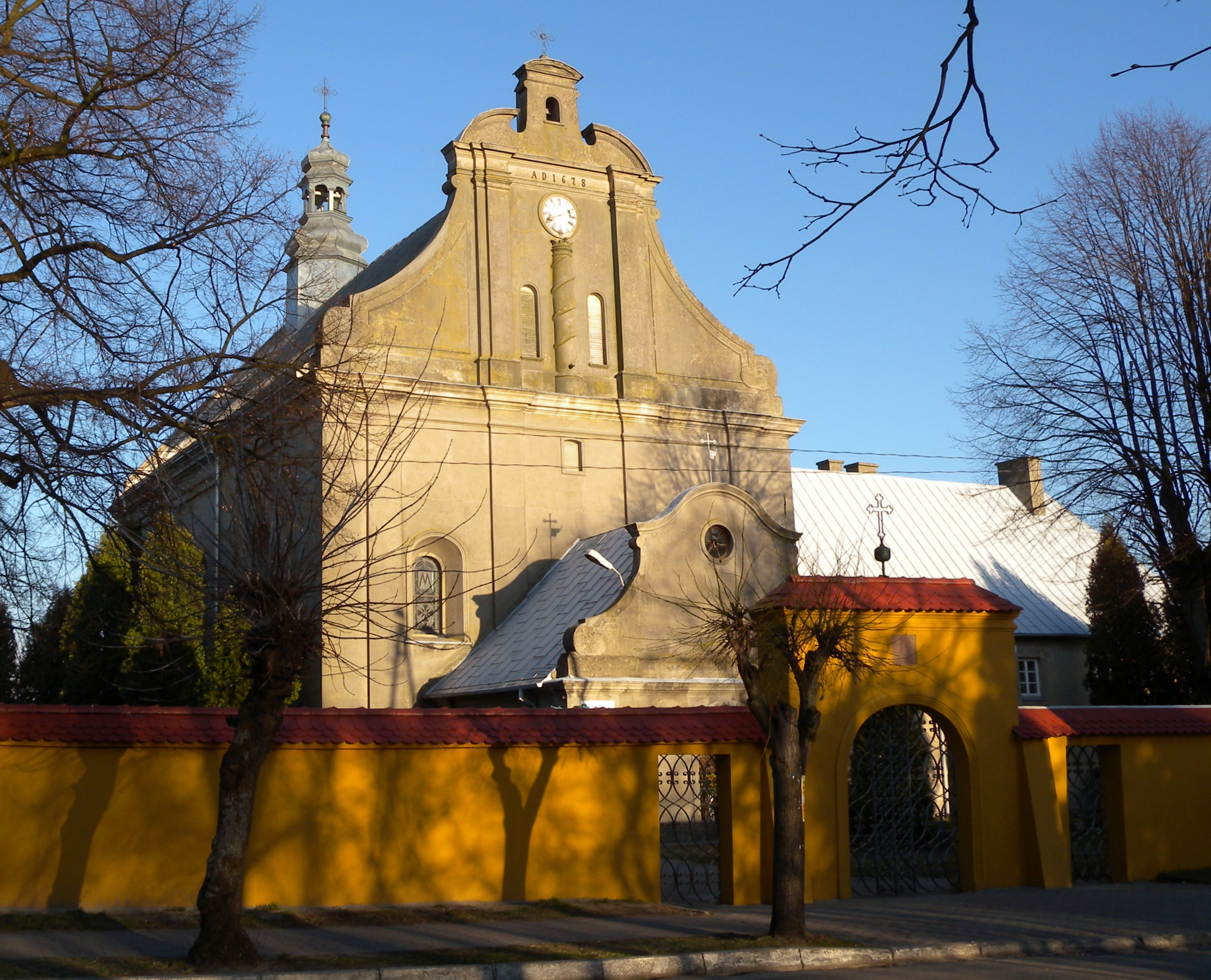
Baroque church of the Exaltation of the Holy Cross

Widawa was founded in the Middle Ages. In 1388 King Władysław II Jagiełło vested Widawa with town rights. It was a private town, administratively located in the Sieradz County in the Sieradz Voivodeship in the Greater Poland Province of the Kingdom of Poland. In 1638 the local Wężyk Widawski noble family founded a Bernardine monastery. During the Deluge (Swedish invasion of Poland), a battle between Poland and Sweden was fought nearby in 1656, and the town was devastated. The Walewski family rebuilt the monastery in the following decades and erected the Baroque church of the Exaltation of the Holy Cross, which remains the greatest historic landmark of Widawa. Nowadays, a museum is located in the monastery. In the 18th century, one of two main routes connecting Warsaw and Dresden ran through the town and Kings Augustus II the Strong and Augustus III of Poland often traveled that route.

Before World War II, the town included about 800 Jews, around one-third of the town's population. On arrival in September 1939, the Germans burned the community's rabbi Abraham Mordechaij Maroko alive because he would not burn the Torah scrolls. During the next two years, the Germans sent many of the town's Jews to forced labour camps and forced others to live in a concentrated ghetto. Some Jews were also sent to Bełchatów. Eventually, most of Widawa's Jews were sent to the Chełmno extermination camp where they were immediately gassed. Few survived the war.
