= Kwiatkowo =

Kwiatkowo may refer to the following places:

- Kwiatkowo, Aleksandrów County in Kuyavian-Pomeranian Voivodeship (north-central Poland)
- Kwiatkowo, Rypin County in Kuyavian-Pomeranian Voivodeship (north-central Poland)
- Kwiatkowo, Masovian Voivodeship (east-central Poland)
- Kwiatkowo, Greater Poland Voivodeship (west-central Poland)
- Kwiatkowo, Warmian-Masurian Voivodeship (north Poland)
