= Kwiatków =

Kwiatków may refer to:

- Kwiatków, Gmina Ostrów Wielkopolski in Greater Poland Voivodeship (west-central Poland)
- Kwiatków, Turek County in Greater Poland Voivodeship (west-central Poland)
- Kwiatków, Opole Voivodeship (south-west Poland)
