= Dobków, Lower Silesian Voivodeship =

Dobków
- Village
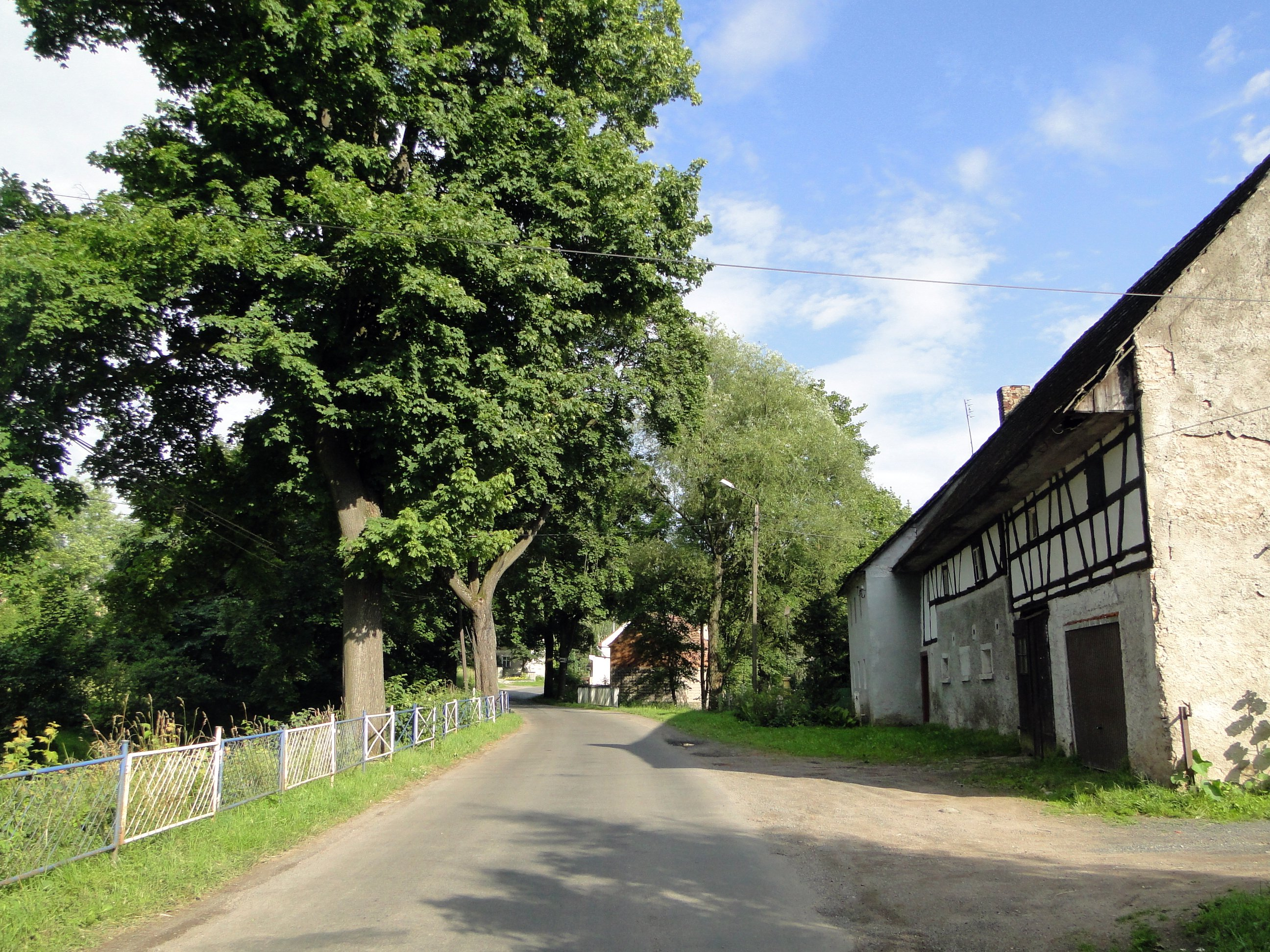
- View of the village

- Location within Poland
- Coordinates: 50°59′22″N 15°56′52″E
- Country: Poland
- Voivodeship: Lower Silesian
- County: Złotoryja
- Gmina: Świerzawa

Dobków [ˈdɔpkuf] is a village in the administrative district of Gmina Świerzawa, within Złotoryja County, Lower Silesian Voivodeship, in south-western Poland.

== Geography ==
Dobków is a linear settlement that stretches for about 3.5 km (2 mi) along the Bukownica River, a tributary of the Kaczawa River.

Geographically, the village is located at the northern base of the Wojcieszowski mountainside, which form one of the limit of the Kaczawskie Mountains.
