= Łask County =

Łask County Powiat łaski
- County
- Flag Coat of arms

- Location within the voivodeship

- Division into gminas
- Coordinates (Łask): 51°35′N 19°8′E
- Country: Poland
- Voivodeship: Łódź
- Seat: Łask
- Gminas: Total 5: Gmina Buczek; Gmina Łask; Gmina Sędziejowice; Gmina Widawa; Gmina Wodzierady

Area
  - Total: 617.38 km^{2} (238.37 sq mi)

Population (2006)
  - Total: 50,874
  - Density: 82.403/km^{2} (213.42/sq mi)
  - Urban: 18,684
  - Rural: 32,190
- Car plates: ELA
- Website: www.lask.com.pl

Łask County (Polish: powiat łaski) is a unit of territorial administration and local government (powiat) in Łódź Voivodeship, central Poland. It came into being on January 1, 1999, as a result of the Polish local government reforms passed in 1998. Its administrative seat and only town is Łask, which lies 32 kilometres (20 mi) south-west of the regional capital Łódź.

The county covers an area of 617.38 square kilometres (238.4 sq mi). As of 2006 its total population is 50,874, out of which the population of Łask is 18,684 and the rural population is 32,190.

== Neighbouring counties ==
Łask County is bordered by Poddębice County to the north, Pabianice County to the east, Bełchatów County to the south-east, Wieluń County to the south-west, and Sieradz County and Zduńska Wola County to the west.

== Administrative divisions ==
The county is subdivided into five gminas (one urban-rural and four rural). These are listed in the following table, in descending order of population.

Gmina	Type	Area (km²)	Population (2006)	Seat
Gmina Łask	urban-rural	146.9	28,406	Łask
Gmina Widawa	rural	178.0	7,954	Widawa
Gmina Sędziejowice	rural	120.2	6,523	Sędziejowice
Gmina Buczek	rural	90.8	4,893	Buczek
Gmina Wodzierady	rural	81.4	3,098	Wodzierady
