= Piątek =

Piątek or Piontek (Polish pronunciation: [ˈpjɔntɛk]) is a surname meaning "Friday" in Polish. Pronounced identically, both forms occur in Poland but the standard spelling, Piątek, is about ten times as common. In other countries, Piontek may be more frequent to prevent mispronunciation. Piątek is also used as a toponym in Poland.

== People ==
=== Piątek ===
- Hanna Gill-Piątek (born 1974), Polish politician
- Karol Piątek (born 1982), Polish footballer
- Krzysztof Piątek (born 1995), Polish footballer
- Łukasz Piątek (born 1985), Polish footballer
- Marek Marian Piątek (born 1954), Polish-Brazilian Catholic bishop
- Piotr Piątek (born 1982), Polish archer
- Tomasz Piątek (born 1974), Polish journalist and writer
- Waldemar Piątek (born 1979), Polish footballer
- Zbigniew Piątek (born 1966), Polish road racing cyclist

=== Piontek ===
- Dave Piontek (1934–2004), American basketball player
- Heinz Piontek (1925–2003), German writer
- Leonard Piontek (1913–1967), Polish footballer
- Sepp Piontek (1940–2026), German footballer and manager
- Tino Piontek (born 1980), known as Purple Disco Machine, German music record producer and DJ
- Zack Piontek (born 1991), South African judoka

== Places ==
- Piątek, Łódź Voivodeship, town in central Poland
- Piątek Mały, village in Greater Poland Voivodeship, central Poland
- Piątek Mały-Kolonia, village in Greater Poland Voivodeship, central Poland
- Piątek Wielki, village in Greater Poland Voivodeship, central Poland
- Gmina Piątek, administrative district in Łódź Voivodeship, central Poland
