= Storm Dudley =

2022 windstorm over the British Isles and eastern Norway

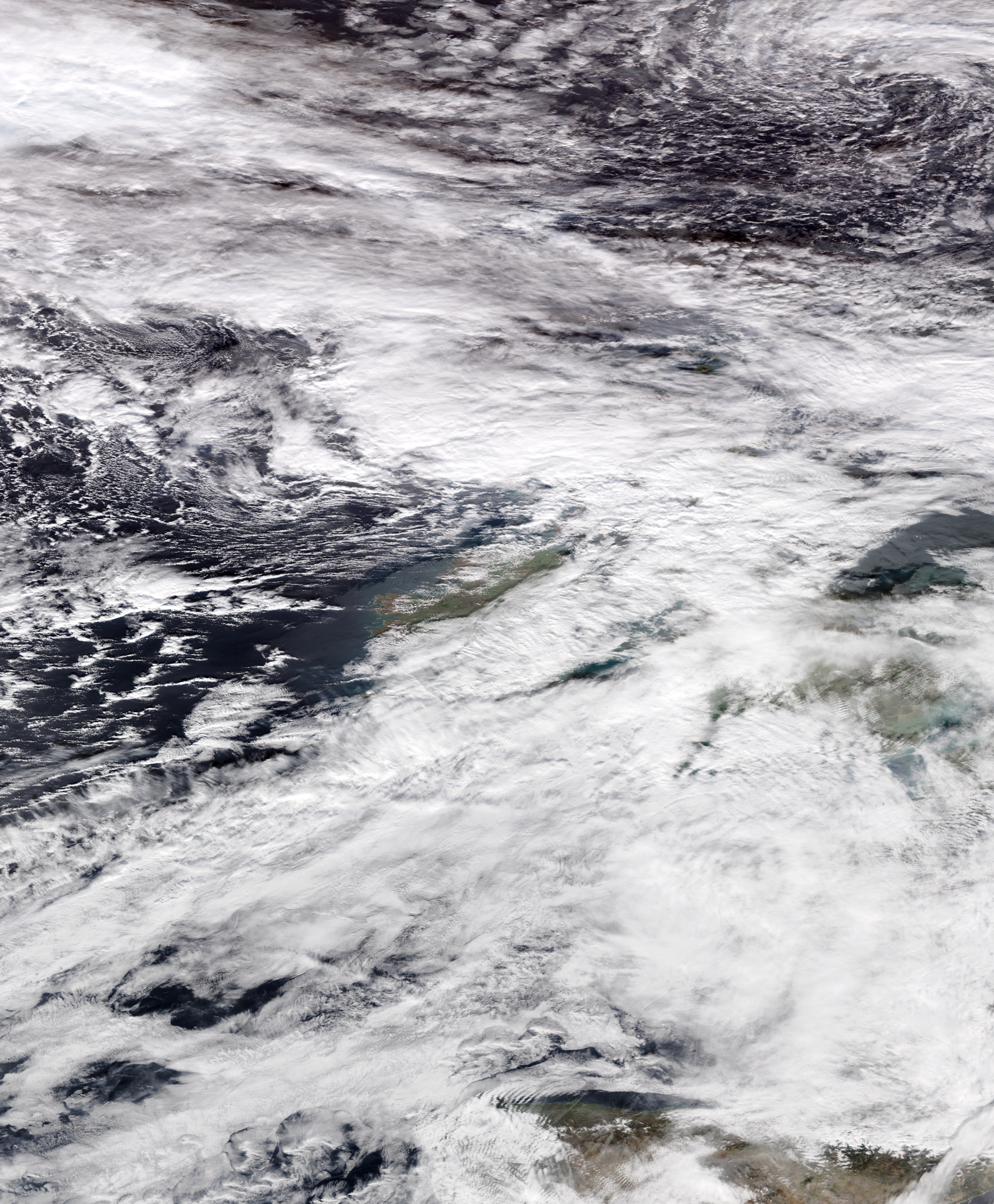

Meteorological history
- Formed: 14 February 2022
- Dissipated: 19 February 2022

Extratropical cyclone
- Highest gusts: 166 km/h (103 mph), North Walsham.

Tornado outbreak
- Tornadoes: 24
- Max. rating: F2 tornado
- Duration: 8 hours, 14 minutes

Overall effects
- Fatalities: 9
- Injuries: 5
- Damage: $863 million (2022 USD), €794 million (2022 Euros)
- Areas affected: United Kingdom, Germany, Poland, The Netherlands, Czech Republic, Lithuania
- Power outages: 225,000
- Part of the 2021–22 European windstorm season

From 14 to 19 February 2022, a European windstorm struck the United Kingdom, Germany, Poland, The Netherlands, the Czech Republic, and Lithuania. The storm was named Storm Dudley by the UK Met Office on 14 February 2022. The storm caused 225,000 people to lose power, killed nine people, and spawned 24 tornadoes across Europe. The storm occurred just before the stronger and more impactful Storm Eunice, which caused over 3.1 million power outages, 17 fatalities, and over €1.83 billion in damage.

== Meteorological history ==
Storm Dudley, along with Storm Eunice and Storm Franklin, formed by a sting jet, a narrow band of winds that can create narrow and intense winds in a small area. It was also partly due to a large polar vortex in the Arctic that formed these storms. The storm trio isn't particularly rare for the area, as it has happened before. The storm also brought a very rare formation of mammatus clouds, and brought wind gusts of 81 miles per hour (130 km/h) in Capel Cruig, Wales, 74 miles per hour (119 km/h) in Yorkshire and 71 miles per hour (114 km/h) in Drumalbin, Scotland.

== Preparations and impacts ==
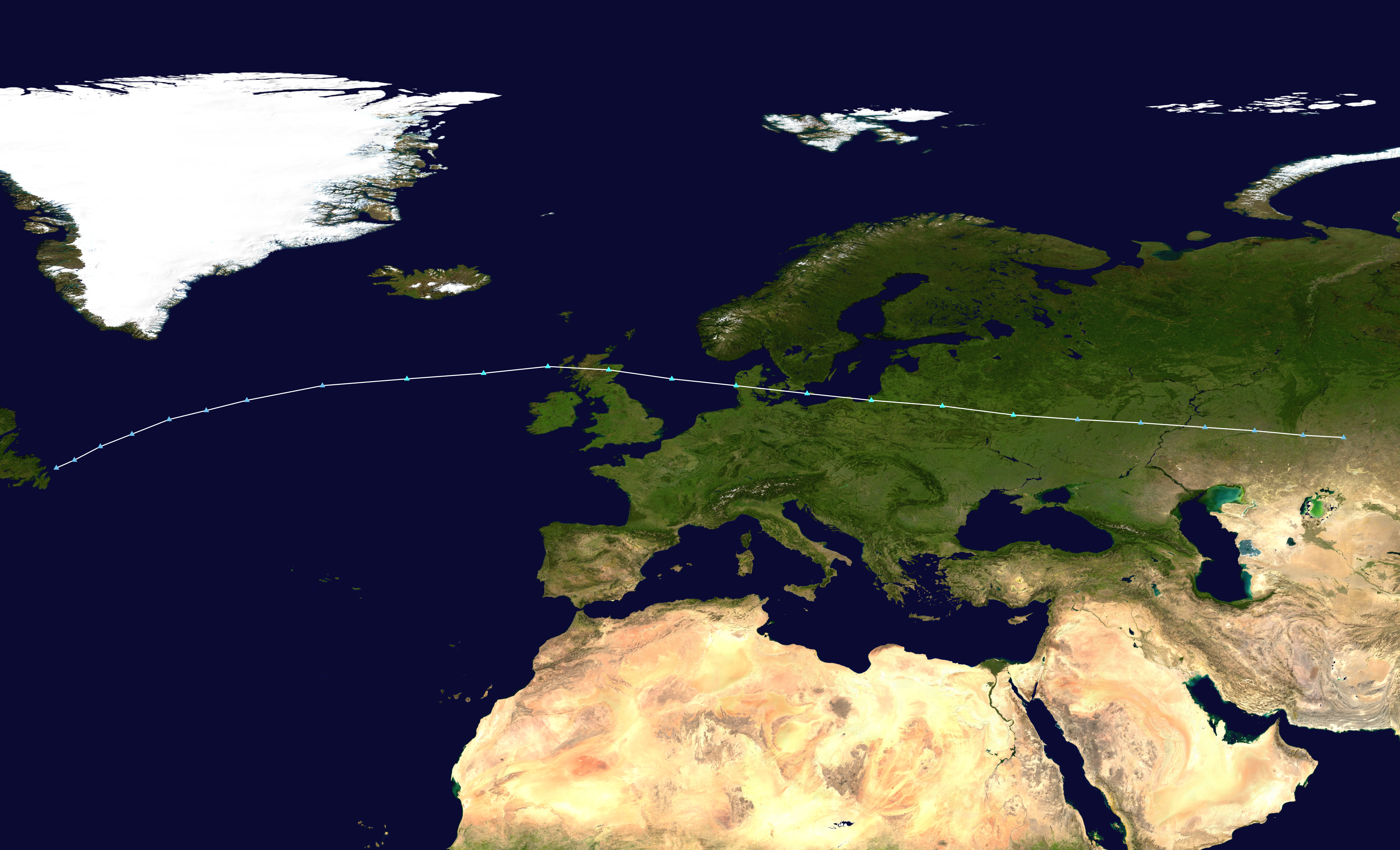
Map plotting the storm's track and intensity, according to the Saffir–Simpson scale Map key Saffir–Simpson scale Tropical depression (≤38 mph, ≤62 km/h) Tropical storm (39–73 mph, 63–118 km/h) Category 1 (74–95 mph, 119–153 km/h) Category 2 (96–110 mph, 154–177 km/h) Category 3 (111–129 mph, 178–208 km/h) Category 4 (130–156 mph, 209–251 km/h) Category 5 (≥157 mph, ≥252 km/h) Unknown Storm type Tropical cyclone Subtropical cyclone Extratropical cyclone, remnant low, tropical disturbance, or monsoon depression

=== United Kingdom ===
The United Kingdom saw one fatality due to Storm Dudley. Dudley was expected to bring winds of 60 to 70 miles per hour (97 to 113 km/h), which caused travel restrictions. The Environment Agency issued 38 flood alerts for the UK. In Yorkshire, a falling power line electrocuted 13 dogs. During the cleanup of Storm Dudley, Storm Eunice struck, further compounding the damage. PwC estimated the insurance losses for the storm to be between £40 million and £75 million.

=== Germany ===
Storm Dudley causes three deaths in Germany, and spawned winds up to 152 kilometres per hour (94 mph) in the country. The Elbe River flowed 2 meters (6.6 ft) higher than normal, and a ferry had its windows shattered. The storm also spawned one tornado in Germany, in Brandenburg, which was rated as an F1/T3 tornado.

=== Poland ===
The storm produced a very intense squall line of severe thunderstorms that moved through Poland, producing damaging straight-line winds and numerous embedded tornadoes. A man in Western Poland near Gorzów Wielkopolski died when a tree fell on his car. Meanwhile, a tornado in Kraków caused a 20 meters (66 ft) long crane to collapse, killing two people and injuring two others. Another tornado in Sierosław injured one, and an F2 tornado in Wójcice injured two. Overall, 23 tornadoes were confirmed in Poland.

=== Lithuania ===
Storm Dudley killed two people in Lithuania due to strong winds.

== Tornado outbreak ==
Confirmed tornadoes by Fujita rating
| FU | F0 | F1 | F2 | F3 | F4 | F5 | Total |
|---|---|---|---|---|---|---|---|
| 4 | 0 | 7 | 13 | 0 | 0 | 0 | 24 |

List of confirmed tornadoes – Thursday, 17 February 2022
| F# | T# | Location | District/ County | Coord. | Time (UTC) | Path length | Comments/Damage |
|---|---|---|---|---|---|---|---|
Germany
| F1 | T3 | Casekow | Brandenburg | 53.21°N 14.20°E | 00:46 | 1.1 km, max. width 70m | This high-end F1 tornado damaged multiple buildings in and around Casekow. Homes in town sustained considerable roof damage, farmhouses were badly damaged outside of town, and horse stables were destroyed. Roof and solar panels were lifted and thrown, with parts shredded to pieces. Heavy damage occurred in a small wooded area, with many trees debranched and snapped. |
Poland
| F1 | N/A | Skwierzyna | Lubuskie | 52.57°N 15.52°E | 02:00 (+/- 5 min.) | Unknown | Roofs of homes were damaged and windows were blown out. Large tree branches were snapped, and pieces of wood were thrown and impaled into a building's insulation layer. |
| F2 | N/A | Izdebno | Wielkopolskie | 52.67°N 16.17°E | 02:24 | 1.1 km | Significant damage to a local forest was reported, and drone photos showed that a large swath of trees was flattened in a convergent pattern. |
| F2 | N/A | Sucharzewo | Wielkopolskie | 52.15°N 16.83°E | 03:03 | Unknown | Significant damage to houses and outbuildings occurred, with some structures largely destroyed. A brick cowshed collapsed, killing a bull inside. Swaths of trees were mowed down in forested areas, and some debarking was noted. |
| FU | N/A | Krzykosy | Wielkopolskie | 52.25°N 18.83°E | 03:11 | Unknown | Power transmission lines and trees were downed, and residences sustained roof damage. At least one building was unroofed entirely. |
| F2 | N/A | Młodzikowice | Wielkopolskie | 52.12°N 17.24°E | 03:18 | 0.9 km | A masonry outbuilding and a garage were largely destroyed, along with the roof of a cowshed with 50 cows living inside the building. Large trees were snapped in a convergent pattern in forested areas. |
| F2 | T4 | Grzywna Szlachecka, Kuczwały | Kujawsko-Pomorskie | 53.14°N 18.64°E | 03:22 | 600m | Masonry outbuildings were destroyed, and vehicles were also damaged. Homes sustained roof, insulation, and window damage, and some buildings had damage to walls. |
| F2 | T4 | Nowe Miasto nad Wartą | Wielkopolskie | 52.09°N 17.40°E | 03:25 | 1.7 km, max. width 240m | A swath of large trees were snapped and uprooted in a convergent pattern as this tornado moved through forested areas. |
| F2 | N/A | Lgów | Wielkopolskie | 52.10°N 17.54°E | 03:32 | Unknown | Severe damage occurred in Lgów, where homes had their roofs torn off, outbuildings were destroyed, and debris was scattered throughout the community. Cars had windows blown out and were damaged by flying debris, and numerous large trees were snapped in a forest outside of town. |
| F2 | N/A | Kosewo | Wielkopolskie | 52.40°N 17.95°E | 03:34 | 0.1 km max. width 100 m | A very brief but strong tornado downed trees in a convergent pattern and tossed boats at Lake Powidzkie. A residential building was heavily damaged, and sustained damage to its windows and insulation layer. |
| F2 | T5 | Dobrzyca, Sośnica | Wielkopolskie | 52.40°N 17.95°E | 03:42 | Unknown | Significant structural damage occurred in Dobrzyca, where numerous homes had their roofs destroyed or torn off, and some sustained loss of their upper-floor exterior walls. Power lines were downed, streets were strewn with debris, and vehicles were also damaged. Large trees were snapped in and around town. |
| F2 | N/A | Stara Ciświca | Wielkopolskie | 52.01°N 17.98°E | 03:50 (+/- 15 min.) | Unknown | Homes and a church had roofing torn off. Several outbuildings were destroyed, and others had walls partially collapsed. Some ducks were killed at a duck farm in the area, and many trees were uprooted and snapped. |
| F1 | T3 | Żurawin | Wielkopolskie | 52.08°N 18.18°E | 03:55 (+/- 15 min.) | Unknown | A house had its metal roof blown off, with wooden beams and metal sheets blown at least 150 metres away from the structure. A few trees were also damaged. |
| F2 | N/A | Tykadłów, Żelazków, Zborów, Podzborów | Wielkopolskie | 51.85°N 18.18°E | 04:00 (+/- 5 min.) | Unknown | Extensive damage occurred as this tornado impacted multiple villages, where homes and other structures had their roofs destroyed, and some had walls collapsed. Cars and buildings had their windows blown out, and many trees were snapped or uprooted. A soccer field was damaged as well. |
| F1 | T3 | Laski | Wielkopolskie | 52.00°N 18.57°E | 04:09 | Unknown | Trucks and trailers were overturned, and roofs were almost entirely torn off from residential buildings, with debris left deposited in nearby trees. |
| F1 | T3 | Łęka | Wielkopolskie | 52.13°N 18.64°E | 04:10 (+/- 5 min.) | Unknown | Roofs were damaged or destroyed in the village as a result of this high-end F1 tornado. In one case, a wooden beam was found speared into a building. Trees in a nearby forest were downed in a convergent pattern. |
| F1 | T3 | Lipicze Górne, Ziemięcin | Łódzkie | 52.13°N 18.55°E | 04:12 | Unknown | Roofs of outbuildings were destroyed, and at least two had walls partly collapsed. Parts of sheet metal and wooden beams from a building were blown off and scattered 100–150 metres away. Trees were downed in a local forest as well. |
| F2 | N/A | Słomków Kościelny | Wielkopolskie | 52.00°N 18.66°E | 04:13 | Unknown | A summer house was completely destroyed, and a nearby car was overturned and heavily damaged. |
| F2 | N/A | Wójcice, Smaszków | Łódzkie | 51.65°N 18.47°E | 04:15 (+/- 5 min.) | Unknown | Numerous houses, outbuildings and trees sustained severe damage in both villages. A greenhouse was damaged, large masonry outbuildings were destroyed, and homes had their roofs torn off. Power transmission and communication lines were downed, and trees were snapped or uprooted. A 65-year-old woman sustained head injuries from a falling roof truss, and her 16-year-old grandson was injured by flying glass. |
| F1 | T3 | Aleksandria | Łódzkie | 51.61°N 18.48°E | 04:20 (+/- 5 min.) | Unknown | Several buildings in close proximity to each other were considerably damaged. Trucks and trailers were overturned, and walls were partly collapsed. |
| F2 | N/A | Różyce Grochowe, Sulimy, Mrożewice | Łódzkie | 51.97°N 19.19°E | 04:30 (+/- 5 min.) | 3 km | Structures in multiple villages sustained major roof damage, with debris scattered over 400 metres away. Large masonry outbuildings were almost fully destroyed and an area of forest was flattened, with many large trees snapped or uprooted. |
| FU | N/A | Sierosław | Łódzkie | 51.50°N 19.62°E | 05:05 (+/- 5 min.) | Unknown | Almost every building in Sierosław suffered some degree of damage, some of which had their roofs torn off, including a few that sustained damage to their brick exterior walls. Farms in the area were significantly damaged, and metal truss electrical transmission towers were blown over. Two trucks were overturned outside of town, and one of the drivers sustained injuries. |
| FU | N/A | Kraków | Małopolskie | 50.02°N 20.05°E | 8:05 (+/- 5 min.) | Unknown | 2 deaths – A large construction crane was toppled to the ground, killing two construction workers. The roof of a supermarket was heavily damaged, with debris from the building strewn throughout the area. Some cars were damaged by flying roof debris, and two people were injured. |

== Highest wind gust per country ==
| Country | Gust | Location | Date |
|---|---|---|---|
| Belgium | 112 km/h | Zeebrugge | 16 February |
| Czech Republic | 160 km/h | Boskovice | 17 February |
| Denmark | 130 km/h | Frøslevlejren | 17 February |
| France | 164 km/h | Calais | 16 February |
| Germany | 153 km/h | Großer Arber | 17 February |
| Guernsey | 156 km/h | Saint Anne | 16 February |
| Ireland | 148 km/h | Waterford | 16 February |
| Jersey | 154 km/h | Saint John | 16 February |
| Luxembourg | 102 km/h | Lac de la Haute-Sûre | 17 February |
| Netherlands | 116 km/h | Lauwersoog | 17 February |
| Poland | 146 km/h | Kikół | 17 February |
| United Kingdom | 166 km/h | North Walsham | 16 February |

== See also ==
- Storm Eunice – impacted similar areas two days later
