= Pólko =

Pólko may refer to the following places:

- Pólko, Kuyavian-Pomeranian Voivodeship (north-central Poland)
- Pólko, Gmina Biała Podlaska in Lublin Voivodeship (east Poland)
- Pólko, Gmina Michałowo in Podlaskie Voivodeship (north-east Poland)
- Pólko, Gmina Supraśl in Podlaskie Voivodeship (north-east Poland)
- Pólko, Lublin County in Lublin Voivodeship (east Poland)
- Pólko, Piaseczno County in Masovian Voivodeship (east-central Poland)
- Pólko, Gmina Stawiszyn in Greater Poland Voivodeship (west-central Poland)
- Pólko, Gmina Żelazków in Greater Poland Voivodeship (west-central Poland)
- Pólko, Międzychód County in Greater Poland Voivodeship (west-central Poland)
- Pólko, Szamotuły County in Greater Poland Voivodeship (west-central Poland)
- Pólko, Lubusz Voivodeship (west Poland)
- Pólko, Kwidzyn County in Pomeranian Voivodeship (north Poland)
- Pólko, Starogard County in Pomeranian Voivodeship (north Poland)
- Pólko, Warmian-Masurian Voivodeship (north Poland)
