= Biernatki =

Biernatki may refer to the following places in Poland:

- Biernatki, Lower Silesian Voivodeship (south-west Poland)
- Biernatki, Kuyavian-Pomeranian Voivodeship (central Poland)
- Biernatki, Podlaskie Voivodeship (north-east Poland)
- Biernatki, Kalisz County in Greater Poland Voivodeship (central Poland)
- Biernatki, Poznań County in Greater Poland Voivodeship (west-central Poland)
