= Zbiersk-Cukrownia =

- Village
- Location within Poland
- Coordinates: 51°57′8″N 18°8′18″E
- Country: Poland
- Voivodeship: Greater Poland
- County: Kalisz
- Gmina: Stawiszyn
- Population: 1,800

Zbiersk-Cukrownia [ˈzbjɛrsk t͡suˈkrɔvɲa] is a village in the administrative district of Gmina Stawiszyn, within Kalisz County, Greater Poland Voivodeship, in west-central Poland.

== History ==
The village was established as a result of administrative reform on 1 January 1973. During said reform, smaller administrative units of gromada and osiedle (settlement) were replaced with larger gminas. There was a question whether to locate gmina's capital in Zbiersk, which was the biggest village of the region, but was located on its outskirts, or nearby Stawiszyn – which was located closer to gmina's center, but was a smaller town (in fact, the smallest town in Poland). To solve the dispute, Zbiersk was divided into Zbiersk (western part) and Zbiersk-Cukrownia (eastern part) along the Konin-Kalisz road. The name of the new village was derived from a local sugar refinery (pl. cukrownia), established in the 19th century.
