= Zborov =

Zborov may refer to:

- Zborov (Šumperk District), a municipality and village in the Czech Republic
- Zborov, Bardejov District, a municipality and village in Slovakia
  - Zborov Castle in the municipality
- Zborov nad Bystricou, a municipality and village in Slovakia
- Zboriv (romanized Zborov), a city in Ukraine
  - Battle of Zborov (1917), a battle of World War I

== See also ==
- Zborów (disambiguation)
