= Sierosław =

Sierosław may refer to the following places:

- Sierosław, Greater Poland Voivodeship (west-central Poland)
- Sierosław, Kuyavian-Pomeranian Voivodeship (north-central Poland)
- Sierosław, Łódź Voivodeship (central Poland)
- Sierosław, West Pomeranian Voivodeship (north-west Poland)
