= Józef Paczoski =

Polish botanist (1864–1942)

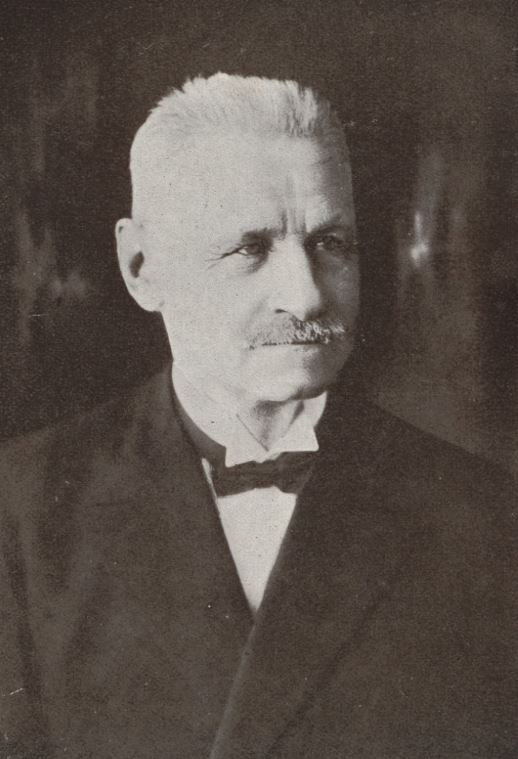
- Paczoski in 1931.
- Born: Józef Konrad Paczoski; 8 December 1864; Byalohorodka, Volhynia Governorate, Russian Empire (present-day Ukraine)
- Died: 14 February 1942 (aged 77); Sierosław, Reichsgau Wartheland, Nazi Germany
- Education: Jagiellonian University
- Known for: phytosociology
- Scientific career
- Fields: Botany
- Workplaces: University of Poznań

Józef Konrad Paczoski (Polish pronunciation: [/ˈjʊzɛf pəˈtʃɒski/]; 8 December 1864 – 14 February 1942), was a distinguished Polish botanist whose significant contributions to the field have left a lasting impact on botanical studies. Born on 8 December 1864, he held the esteemed position of Professor at Poznań University and was recognized as a corresponding member of the Polish Academy of Learning. A pioneer in his field, Paczoski is credited with coining the term "phytosociology" and played a vital role in establishing and shaping this specialized branch of botany. Beyond his revolutionary work in phytosociology, he gained acclaim for his extensive research on the diverse flora present within the renowned Białowieża Forest.

== Life and career ==
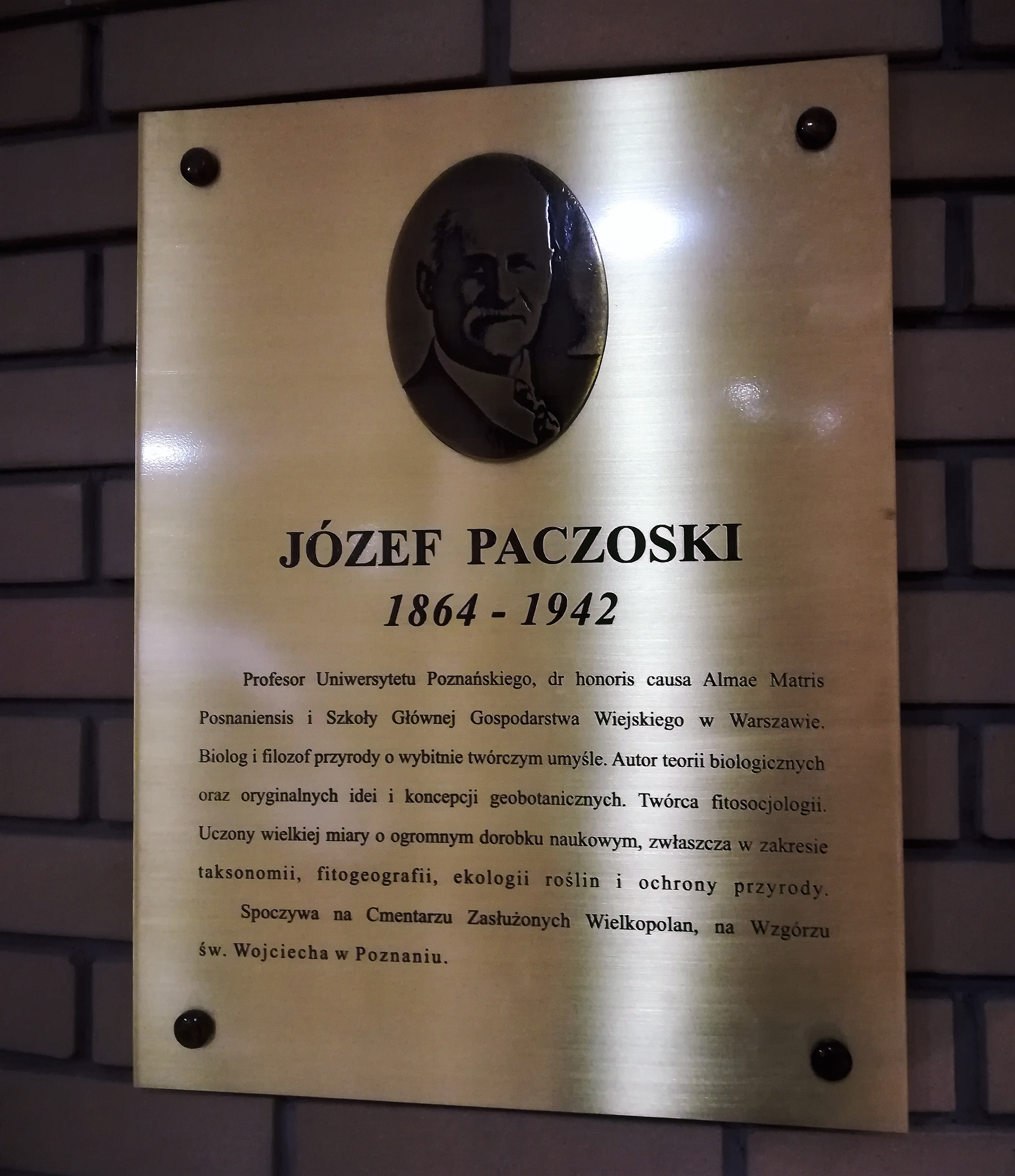
A commemorative plaque devoted to Paczoski at the Collegium Biologicum of the Adam Mickiewicz University in Poznań.

Paczoski was born on 8 December 1864 in Byalohorodka near Iziaslav, in the historical region of Volhynia (now Ukraine). He studied natural sciences and botany at the Jagiellonian University in Kraków and later at the University of Kiev, where he worked under Professor Ivan Ivanovich Schmalhausen.

In 1887, his first floristic article was published in Kiev. In 1896, he introduced the term "phytosociology" to describe the study of natural plant communities, marking a major contribution to modern vegetation science.

During the interwar period, Paczoski became head of the forest reserves in the Białowieża Forest, conducting extensive research on its primeval vegetation and forest dynamics. From 1925 to 1931, he served as Professor of Plant Systematics and Sociology at Poznań University, where he founded the Institute of Plant Sociology, considered the first of its kind in the world.

He was later elected a member of the Polish Academy of Learning (Polska Akademia Umiejętności), which later evolved into the Polish Academy of Sciences.

== Death ==
He died on 14 February 1942 in Sierosław near Poznań, Poland, of a heart attack, after hearing that his grandson had been beaten by the Gestapo during the Nazi occupation of Poland. Another biographical entry in the Great Soviet Encyclopedia also records his death in 1942 during World War II.

== Plant species named after Jozef Paczoski ==
- Allium paczoskianum
- Centaurea paczoskyi
- Hieracium paczoskianum
- Jurinea paczoskiana
- Pyrethrum paczoskii
- Tanacetum paczoskii
- Carex paczoskii
- Lamium paczoskianum
- Chamaecytisus paczoskii (Krecz.)
- Cytisus paczoskii
- Onobrychis paczoskiana
- Gagea paczoskii (Zapal.)
- Corydalis paczoskii
- Papaver paczoskii
- Pistolochia paczoskii
- Veronica paczoskiana

== Publications ==
- Paczoski J. 1927. Ranunculaceae. In: Szafer W (ed.) Flora polska : Rośliny naczyniowe Polski i ziem ościennych (Polish: Flora of Poland: Vascular plants of Poland and adjacent territories). Vol. III. Kraków: Polska Akademja Umiejętności
- Paczoski J. 1928. La végétation de la Foret de Białowieża (French: The Vegetation of Białowieża Forest). Varsovie.
- Paczoski J. 1928. Biologiczna struktura lasu (Polish : The Biological Structure of Forest). Sylwan 3: 193 - 221.
- Paczoski J. 1929. Die Wälder Bosniens (German: The Forests of Bosnia). Lwów: Polskie Towarzystwo Leśne.
- Paczoski J. 1930. Lasy Białowieży (Polish: The Forests of Białowieża). Monografje Naukowe 1. Warszawa: Państwowa Rada Ochrony Przyrody.
- Paczoski J. 1933. Podstawowe zagadnienia geografji roślin (Polish: Basic concepts in plant geography). Biblioteka Botaniczna. Vol. III. Poznań: Wydawnictwo Polskiego Towarzystwa Botanicznego.
- Paczoski J. 1935. Piętrowość lasu (Polish: Layers of forest vegetation). Biblioteka Botaniczna. Vol. IV. Poznań: Wydawnictwo Polskiego Towarzystwa Botanicznego.

== See also ==
- List of Polish botanists
- Timeline of Polish science and technology
