= Dębe =

Dębe may refer to the following places:

- Dębe, Czarnków-Trzcianka County in Greater Poland Voivodeship (west-central Poland)
- Dębe, Legionowo County in Masovian Voivodeship (east-central Poland)
- Dębe, Sokołów County in Masovian Voivodeship (east-central Poland)
- Dębe, Kalisz County in Greater Poland Voivodeship (west-central Poland)

Technology

- DEBE (program) Utility program for IBM DOS/360.
