= Zborów =

Zborów may refer to:

- Zborów, Kalisz County, in Greater Poland Voivodeship, west-central Poland
- Zborów, Łódź Voivodeship, central Poland
- Zborów, Świętokrzyskie Voivodeship, south-central Poland
- Zborów, Turek County, in Greater Poland Voivodeship, west-central Poland
- Zboriv, Ukraine, formerly part of Poland under the name Zborów

== See also ==
- Zborov (disambiguation)
