= Zbiersk-Kolonia =

- Village
- Location within Poland
- Coordinates: 51°57′N 18°10′E
- Country: Poland
- Voivodeship: Greater Poland
- County: Kalisz
- Gmina: Stawiszyn

Zbiersk-Kolonia [ˈzbjɛrsk kɔˈlɔɲa] is a village in the administrative district of Gmina Stawiszyn, within Kalisz County, Greater Poland Voivodeship, in west-central Poland.
