= Złotniki Wielkie =

- Village
- Location within Poland
- Coordinates: 51°53′N 18°11′E
- Country: Poland
- Voivodeship: Greater Poland
- County: Kalisz
- Gmina: Żelazków

Złotniki Wielkie [zwɔtˈniki ˈvjɛlkʲɛ] is a village in the administrative district of Gmina Żelazków, within Kalisz County, Greater Poland Voivodeship, in west-central Poland.
