= Złotniki Małe-Kolonia =

- Village
- Location within Poland
- Coordinates: 51°53′37″N 18°8′18″E
- Country: Poland
- Voivodeship: Greater Poland
- County: Kalisz
- Gmina: Stawiszyn
- Population: 40

Złotniki Małe-Kolonia [zwɔtˈniki ˈmawɛ kɔˈlɔɲa] is a village in the administrative district of Gmina Stawiszyn, within Kalisz County, Greater Poland Voivodeship, in west-central Poland.
