= Big Jet TV =

YouTube aircraft enthusiast channel

YouTube information
- Channel: Big Jet TV
- Years active: 2017–present
- Subscribers: 456 thousand
- Views: 103 million
- Last updated: June 2025
- Website: bigjet.tv

Big Jet TV is a British YouTube channel that records and livestreams aeroplanes landing at major airports, particularly London's Heathrow Airport. It was founded in 2016 by Jerry Dyer, an aviation enthusiast who livestreams with commentary from the roof of a specially adapted van. Within a year, he had taken out a £30,000 loan and launched paid memberships at £4.99 a month. By 2020, the business could afford to employ a full-time administrator. As of May 2025, Dyer has six filming locations around Heathrow.

The channel made international headlines in February 2022 when it livestreamed planes landing at Heathrow during Storm Eunice in very high winds. The BBC carried a report titled "Big Jet TV turns plane-watching into a phenomenon". The channel received further recognition during Storm Gerrit in December 2023. In January 2025, more than 200,000 viewers tuned in to watch the channel's livestream of planes landing at Heathrow during Storm Éowyn.

In June 2025, the channel livestreamed footage of a deportee running across a taxiway at Heathrow, which soon drew international media attention.
