= Gmina Żelazków =

Gmina Żelazków Żelazków Commune
- Gmina
- Coat of arms

- Coordinates (Żelazków): 51°51′N 18°10′E
- Country: Poland
- Voivodeship: Greater Poland
- County: Kalisz County
- Seat: Żelazków

Area
  - Total: 113.57 km^{2} (43.85 sq mi)

Population (2006)
  - Total: 8,942
  - Density: 78.74/km^{2} (203.9/sq mi)
- Website: http://www.zelazkow.pl/

Gmina Żelazków is a rural gmina (administrative district) in Kalisz County, Greater Poland Voivodeship, in west-central Poland. Its seat is the village of Żelazków, which lies approximately 12 kilometres (7 mi) north-east of Kalisz and 105 km (65 mi) south-east of the regional capital Poznań.

The gmina covers an area of 113.57 square kilometres (43.8 sq mi), and had a total population of 8,942 as of 2006.

== Villages ==
Gmina Żelazków contains the villages and settlements of Anielin, Biernatki, Chrusty, Czartki, Dębe, Florentyna, Garzew, Goliszew, Góry Zborowskie, Góry Złotnickie, Helenów, Ilno, Janków, Kokanin, Kolonia Kokanin, Kolonia Skarszewek, Koronka, Michałów, Niedźwiady, Nowy Borków, Pólko, Russów, Russówek, Skarszew, Skarszewek, Stary Borków, Strugi, Szosa Turecka, Tykadłów, Witoldów, Wojciechówka, Zborów, Żelazków, Złotniki Małe and Złotniki Wielkie.

== Neighbouring gminas ==
Gmina Żelazków is bordered by the city of Kalisz and by the gminas of Blizanów, Ceków-Kolonia, Mycielin, Opatówek and Stawiszyn.
