= Strugi, Greater Poland Voivodeship =

Strugi
- Village
- Location within Poland
- Coordinates: 51°53′15″N 18°12′5″E
- Country: Poland
- Voivodeship: Greater Poland
- County: Kalisz
- Gmina: Żelazków
- Population: 50

Strugi [ˈstruɡi] is a village in the administrative district of Gmina Żelazków, within Kalisz County, Greater Poland Voivodeship, in west-central Poland.
