= Miedza, Greater Poland Voivodeship =

Miedza
- Village
- Location within Poland
- Coordinates: 51°57′35″N 18°6′43″E
- Country: Poland
- Voivodeship: Greater Poland
- County: Kalisz
- Gmina: Stawiszyn
- Population: 210

Miedza [ˈmjɛd͡za] is a village in the administrative district of Gmina Stawiszyn, within Kalisz County, Greater Poland Voivodeship, in west-central Poland.
