= Góry Zborowskie =

- Village
- Location within Poland
- Coordinates: 51°50′37″N 18°10′40″E
- Country: Poland
- Voivodeship: Greater Poland
- County: Kalisz
- Gmina: Żelazków
- Population: 50

Góry Zborowskie [ˈɡurɨ zbɔˈrɔfskʲɛ] is a village in the administrative district of Gmina Żelazków, within Kalisz County, Greater Poland Voivodeship, in west-central Poland.
