= Wojciechówka, Greater Poland Voivodeship =

Wojciechówka
- Village
- Location within Poland
- Coordinates: 51°46′55″N 18°06′59″E
- Country: Poland
- Voivodeship: Greater Poland
- County: Kalisz
- Gmina: Żelazków

Wojciechówka (Polish pronunciation: [vɔjt͡ɕɛˈxufka]) is a village in the administrative district of Gmina Żelazków, within Kalisz County, Greater Poland Voivodeship, in west-central Poland.
