= Storm Eunice =

2022 windstorm over northwestern Europe

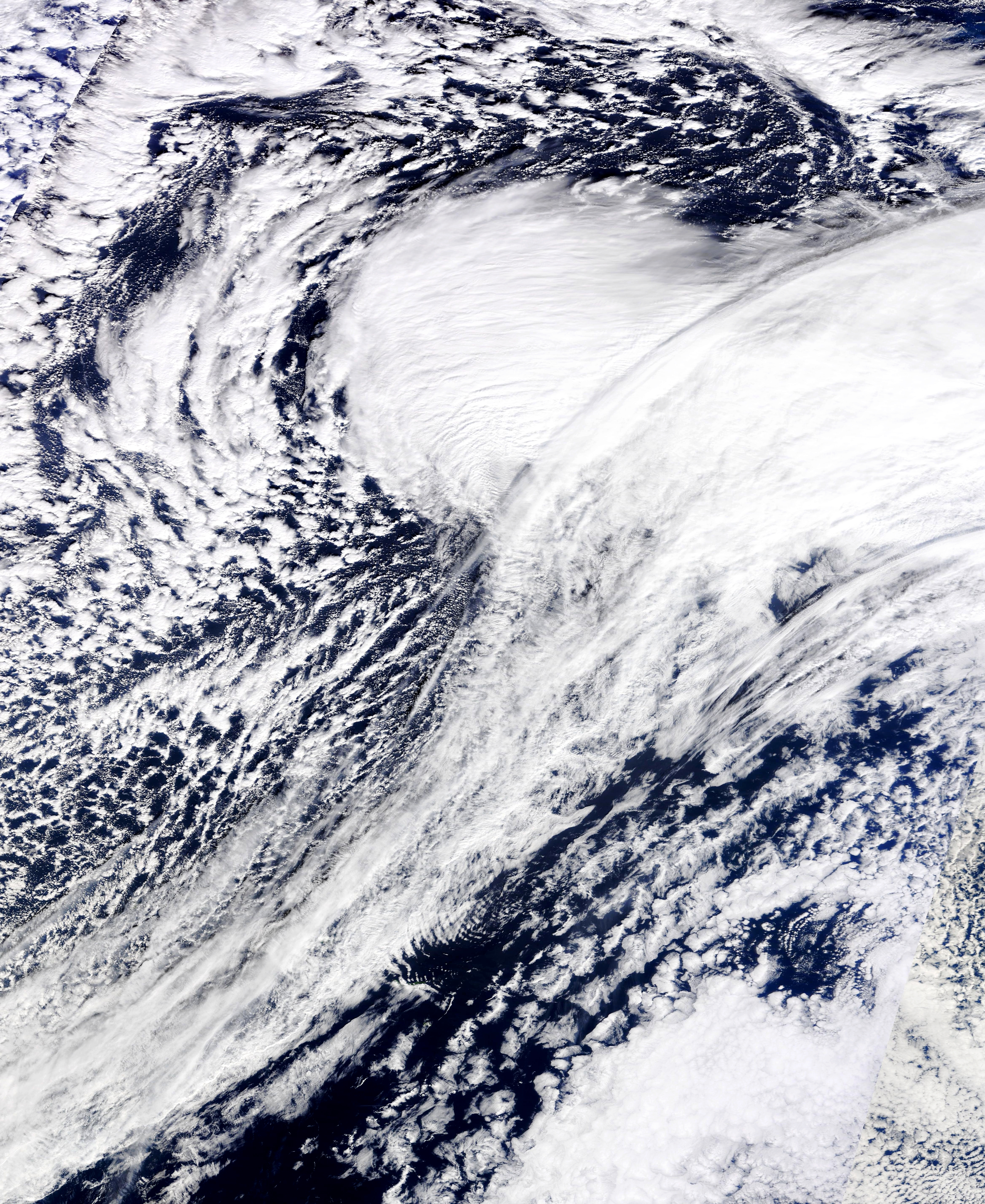
- Storm Eunice on 17 February 2022

Meteorological history
- Formed: 17 February 2022
- Dissipated: 19 February 2022

Extratropical cyclone
- Highest gusts: 196 km/h (122 mph; 106 kn) at The Needles, Isle of Wight

Overall effects
- Fatalities: 18; Netherlands: 5; Poland: 4; Germany: 3; United Kingdom: 3; Belgium: 2; Ireland: 1
- Damage: €1.83 billion+: United Kingdom: £369 million (€435.8 million); Germany: €900 million; Netherlands: €500 million
- Areas affected: Belgium, Czech Republic, Denmark, France, Germany, Ireland, Lithuania, Netherlands, Poland, United Kingdom
- Power outages: 3,100,000 at peak
- Part of the 2021–2022 European windstorm season

Storm Eunice (/ˈjuːnɪs/) (known as Storm Zeynep in Germany and Storm Nora in Denmark) was a powerful extratropical cyclone with hurricane-force winds that was part of the 2021–2022 European windstorm season. Storm Eunice was named by the UK Met Office on 14 February 2022. A red weather warning was issued on 17 February for parts of South West England and South Wales, with a second red warning issued on 18 February, the day the storm struck, for London, the South East and East of England.

Eunice set a new record for the fastest wind gust recorded in England with 122 miles per hour (196 km/h) at The Needles, Isle of Wight. The storm was one of the most powerful to impact the south coast of England since the Great Storm of 1987.

The storm caused extensive damage in parts of Western, Central, Northern and Eastern Europe; millions of people were left without power across affected areas, and many homes had sustained damage. In the UK, 1.4 million homes left without power at its peak. Several other countries were struck hard by Eunice, with wind damage being mostly the cause of it. Heavy winds damaged parts of buildings, and wind gusts in excess of 120 miles per hour (190 km/h) were recorded. Eunice caused 17 fatalities, and multiple injuries.

== Meteorology ==
The Met Office named Storm Eunice (as well as Storm Dudley) on 14 February; the Free University of Berlin (FUB) named the same storm "Zeynep" on 16 February. Storm Eunice formed on 17 February on a complex cold front situated west of Azores. It rapidly deepened later on 17 February being driven along the right entrance region of the upper-level jet. Met Éireann of Ireland tweeted that the rapid pressure drop during cyclogenesis met the criteria for explosive cyclogenesis. The storm also developed a sting jet similarly to the Great Storm of 1987.

== Impact ==
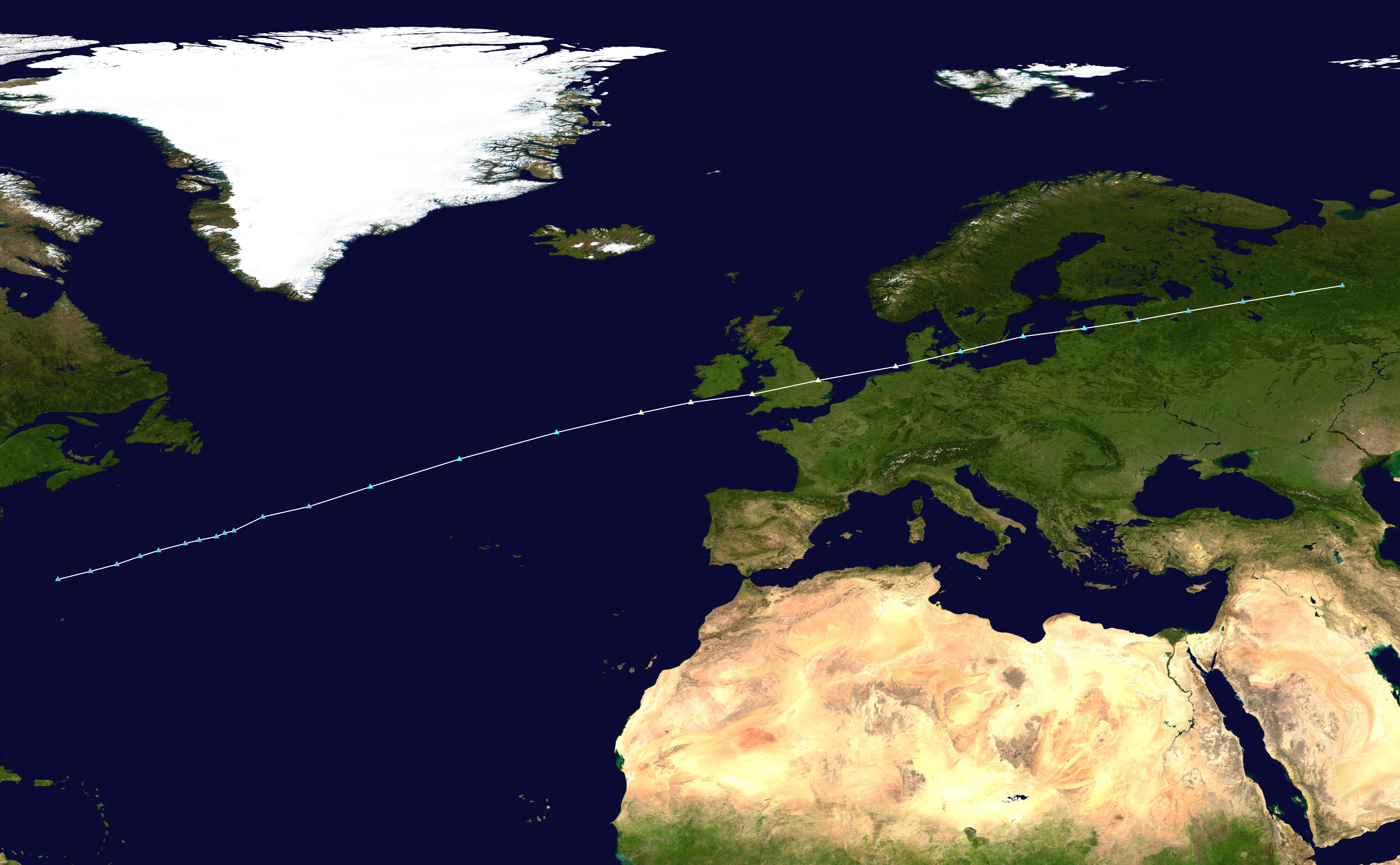
Map plotting the storm's track and intensity, according to the Saffir–Simpson scale Map key Saffir–Simpson scale Tropical depression (≤38 mph, ≤62 km/h) Tropical storm (39–73 mph, 63–118 km/h) Category 1 (74–95 mph, 119–153 km/h) Category 2 (96–110 mph, 154–177 km/h) Category 3 (111–129 mph, 178–208 km/h) Category 4 (130–156 mph, 209–251 km/h) Category 5 (≥157 mph, ≥252 km/h) Unknown Storm type Tropical cyclone Subtropical cyclone Extratropical cyclone, remnant low, tropical disturbance, or monsoon depression

=== Belgium ===
The roof of the Ghelamco Arena was damaged, resulting in the postponement of the First Division A match between Gent and Seraing scheduled for 18 February. In Tournai, parts of a crane were torn loose and fell on a hospital, damaging the roof and top floor. The town centre of Asse had to be evacuated due to the risk of a church tower collapsing.

Public transport was temporarily suspended in large parts of Flanders, with NMBS and De Lijn both announcing trains, buses, and trams were scrapped. Thalys services between Brussels and Amsterdam were also cancelled. Two ships ran adrift off the Belgian coast. The cargo ship Diamond Sky drifted through two offshore wind farms, but arrived at its final destination in the Netherlands without sustaining any damage. The Maersk Nimbus oil tanker was forced to lie at anchor in the C-Power offshore wind farm until its rescue by tugboats the next day.

Two people died as a result of the heavy winds. In Ypres, a 79-year-old British man drowned after falling from his boat at the marina. In Ghent, a man was hit by a broken solar panel and died in a hospital the next day. At least three others were seriously injured. In Menen, an 18-year-old jogger was taken to a hospital in critical condition after being hit by a loose branch. In Temse, a man sustained a major head injury after a metal plate was ripped off a construction site container. In Veurne, a truck driver was hospitalized after his or her truck was overturned.

The highest wind gust measured in Belgium during the storm was 144 km/h (89 mph) in Knokke-Heist.

=== Czech Republic ===
The storm had left 26,000 homes without power and several railway lines in the country were suspended.

=== Denmark ===
The Danish Meteorological Institute decided to give the storm the name Nora, believing the name Eunice would be difficult to pronounce in Nordic languages. Nora did not cause significant damage to Denmark, and most models suggest Nora hit it with wind speeds of 60~70 km/h (37~43 mph). They also suggested Nora hit Southern Jutland the most, particularly near the German border as this was where Nora was closest to Denmark from Germany.

The highest wind recorded during the storm was 146 km/h (91 mph) in Højer.

=== France ===
In France, an orange warning was issued in 5 departments, with 140 km/h (87 mph) winds anticipated in the northernmost points of France, however the peak was 176 km/h (109 mph) at Cap Gris Nez. Nord, Pas-de-Calais, Somme, Seine-Maritime, and Manche all received orange weather warnings, and yellow weather warnings were issued for most of Northern France. Police in Wimereux were reported to have been patrolling the seafront ensuring nobody walked on it.

Six people were seriously injured in the Nord department of France. Up to 160,000 households were left without electricity throughout the country. Regional trains in Hauts-de-France and Normandy were suspended, and the Lille-Flandres station was temporarily evacuated after debris fell on the glass roof.

=== Germany ===
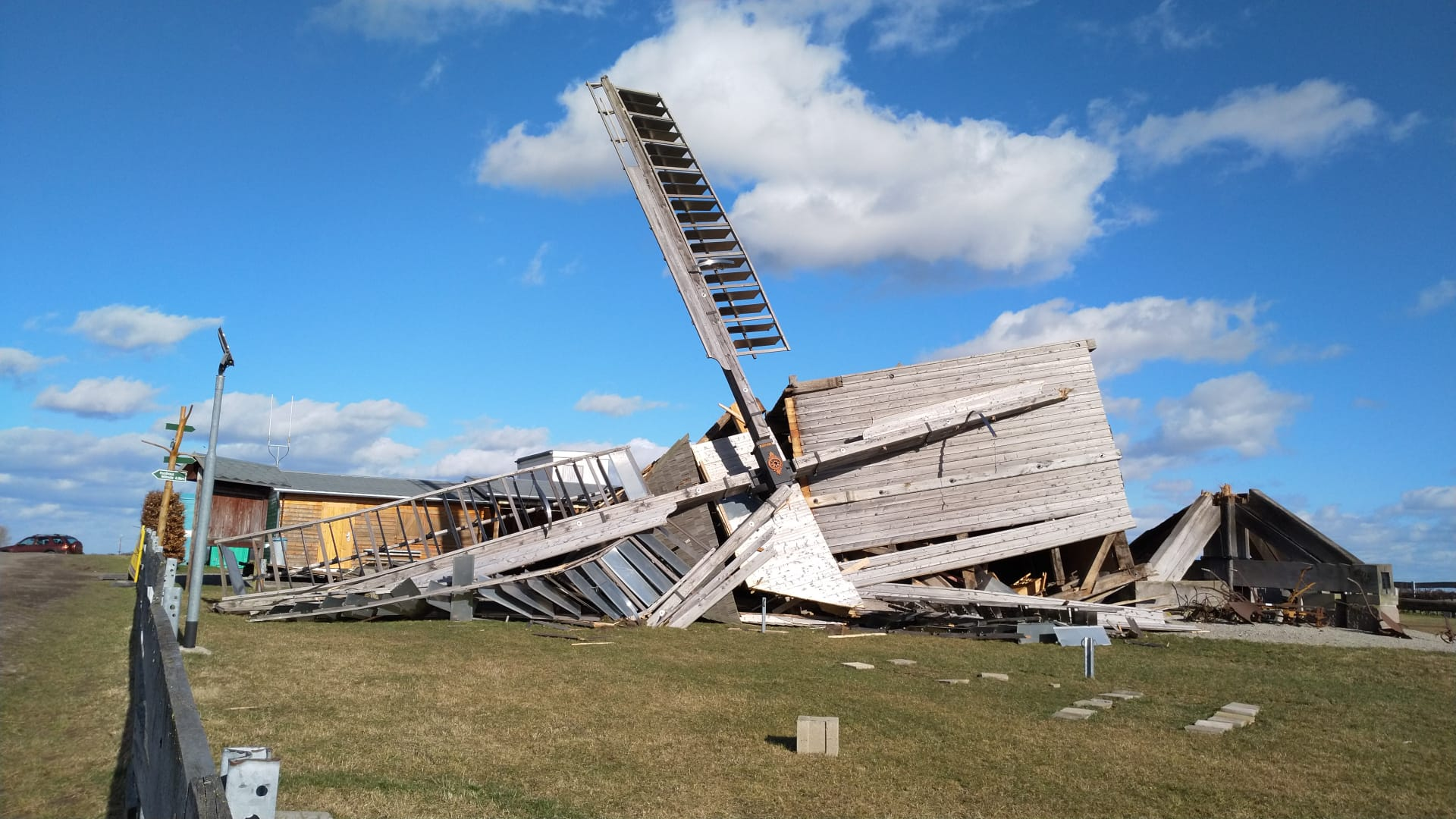
The wreckage of the windmill at Klettbach.

In Germany, Eunice was named Zeynep by the FUB, ahead of the system's impact storm tide warnings were issued near the Elbe river in preparation for 90 mph (145 km/h) winds, higher than Ylenia which impacted the area only days prior. Eunice made landfall at about midday local time, close to the mouth of the Elbe.

Two people died in separate car accidents in the western state of North Rhine-Westphalia in connection with the storm, authorities said. A man died after falling when trying to repair a damaged roof near Cuxhaven, Lower Saxony in the municipality of Wurster Nordseeküste.

In Hamburg, a storm surge up the River Elbe reached 3.75m. A 55-meter crane collapsed on an under-construction office building in Bremen.

A post mill at Klettbach, Thuringia was blown down. Photographs show that the main post had snapped where the quarterbars join and the mill had blown over onto its side. It is hoped that the mill can be rebuilt.

Initial estimation of insurance loss was 900 million euros (US$1.02 billion).

The highest wind gust measured in Germany was 145.8 km/h (90.6 mph) at Brocken.

=== Ireland ===
On 16 February, Met Éireann issued a Status Orange wind warning for seven counties for 18 February, saying the storm would bring severe and potentially damaging winds, gusting up to 130 km/h. The next day, further weather warnings for rain, wind and snow were issued by Met Éireann, with a Status Red wind warning for counties Cork, Kerry, Clare and Waterford, while all schools, colleges, universities and childcare facilities were advised to close in counties with Status Red wind and Orange snow warnings. A number of flights, ferry crossings, bus and train services were cancelled throughout the country.

A gust of wind with a speed of 172 kilometres per hour (107 mph) was recorded offshore at Fastnet Lighthouse, while a gust of 137 kilometres per hour (85 mph) was recorded at Roche's Point, Cork Harbour.

Up to 80,000 homes and businesses were without power nationally. In County Wexford, a 59-year-old council worker was killed by a falling tree while out clearing debris. There were reports of damages to the roof of Clontarf Road DART station.

=== Lithuania ===
The storm caused power outages across Lithuania on 19 February, mostly in the western and central regions. The water level in the river Danė in Lithuania's port town Klaipėda rose rapidly and flooded streets in the city centre, and shipping in the region had to be stopped. According to representatives of Klaipėda Port, wind gusts reached 90 km/h (56 mph) and is expected to rise up to 100–108 km/h (62–67 mph). Maximum recorded wave height was 5 meters (16 feet).

=== Luxembourg ===
The storm caused flight disruptions at Findel Airport, where some flights were cancelled, and wind gusts of up to 110 km/h (68 mph) were forecasted.

=== Netherlands ===
The meteorological institute KNMI issued rare code red warnings as a result of Storm Eunice for Zeeland, South Holland, North Holland, Friesland and IJsselmeer regions. A code orange was in effect for the rest of the country, excluding Limburg, which faced only a code yellow warning. KNMI reported that they expected gusts between 100 and 120 km/h for inland areas. This is the fourth time a code red has been issued since 2021 in the Netherlands, with the last in July 2021.

Dutch railway operator NS announced on 17 February that it was cancelling all domestic and international train traffic on 18 February at 14:00 CET (13:00 UTC). Many universities and schools closed their doors in the afternoon of 18 February. In addition, national retailers, courts and town halls stopped services across the country in the afternoon.

The Eredivisie match between Fortuna Sittard and Sparta Rotterdam scheduled for the evening of 18 February was postponed as the safety of players, staff and supporters could not be guaranteed due to the extreme weather conditions in the area.

On 18 February, four people were killed in accidents involving fallen trees. Two people died in Amsterdam after being struck by a falling tree; one of them was a cyclist. A driver in Diemen was struck and killed by a falling tree as well. A fourth person died in Adorp near Groningen, after colliding with a fallen tree in their car.

The roof of the ADO Den Haag Stadium was damaged.

In the early evening of 18 February, several houses in The Hague were evacuated following reported instability in one of the two towers of the Elandkerk in the town's Zeeheldenkwartier neighbourhood.

The storm also caused wind meters far more inland to register high wind gusts. In Cabauw, Utrecht, a wind gust of 145 km/h (90 mph) was measured.

=== Poland ===
Four people including two car drivers and two passers-by were killed and nine people injured. The storm brought down thousands of trees, and blocked road and rail transport (mainly in Pomerania, Mazovia, Greater Poland, Warmia and Masuria). PKP IC trains suffered from cancellations and delays of more than 400 minutes. More than 1.2 million people remained without electricity. More than 5,000 buildings were damaged. The 112 emergency phone number was overloaded. There were more than 180,000 emergency calls and more than 25,000 emergency actions, mainly regarding fallen trees, severed electricity lines or damaged roofs. Some skyscrapers in Warsaw were damaged. The highest gusts were recorded on the morning of 19 February in the Baltic port of Łeba (119 km/h) and on Śnieżka mountain (162 km/h).

=== United Kingdom ===
Eunice caused at least £360 million (US$489 million) worth of damage in the UK.

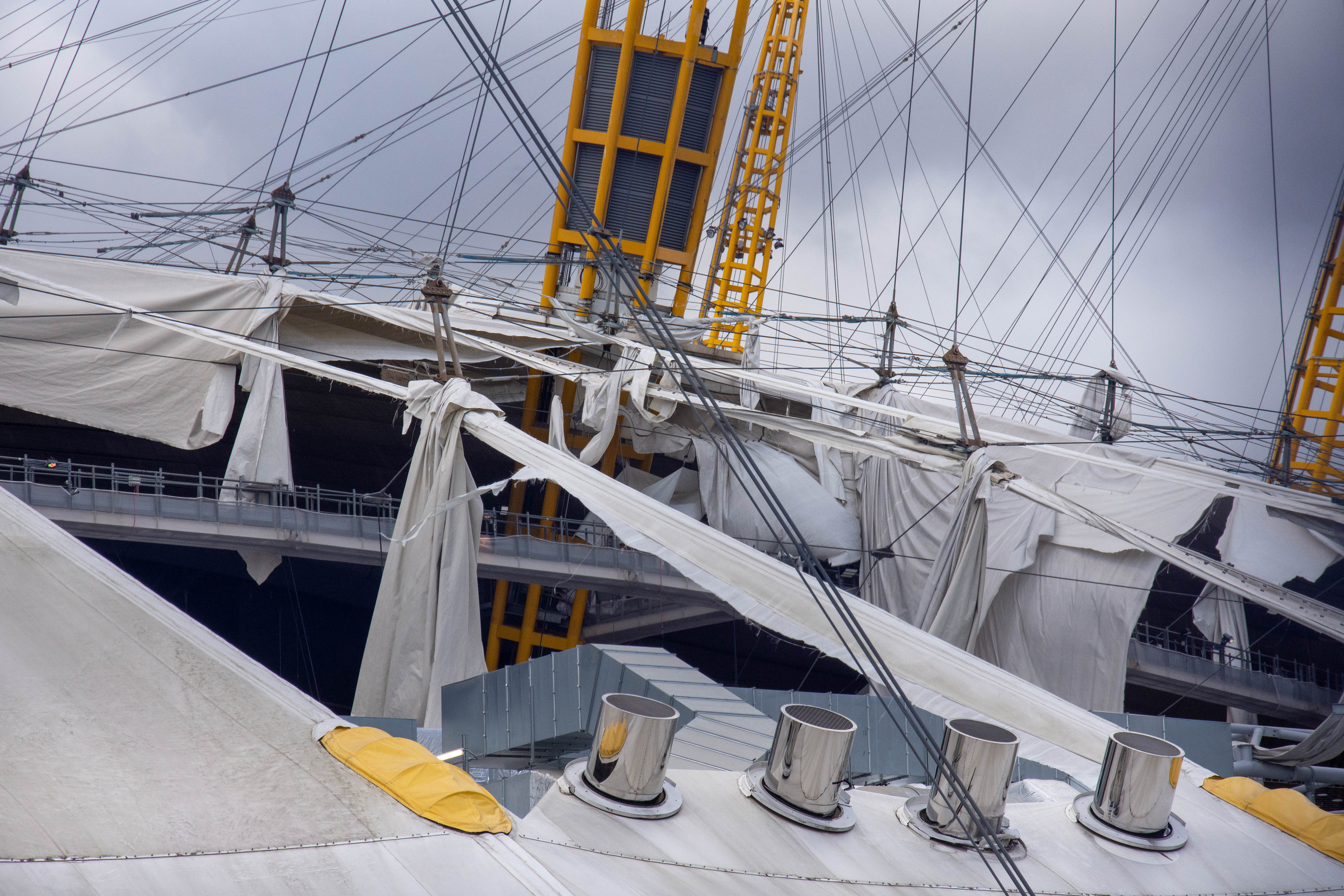
Damage caused to the roof of The O2 Arena

Weather warnings for wind, ice and rain were issued by the Met Office spanning most of the UK on 17 February: these warnings included red warnings, because of a danger to life from flying debris, across Wales and Southern England. People living on the north coasts of Cornwall, Devon and Somerset in South West England were warned to expect flooding, hence the "danger to life" red warning. Soon after, South East England, East of England and London were issued a red warning. Schools were widely closed, along with public facilities (e.g. libraries), delivery services, sea crossings, and several bridges. The Humber Bridge, Queen Elizabeth II Bridge and the Orwell Bridge were closed; the closure of the Severn Bridge and the Prince of Wales Bridge made it the first time that both Severn bridges have been closed simultaneously, and the first time the Prince of Wales bridge had been closed due to wind. The Langstone Bridge closed for almost three hours over fears of high tide surges, cutting off Hayling Island as the only road to and from the settlement. The prime minister, Boris Johnson, said that the army had been placed on "standby".

Authorities across the country were inundated with phone calls related to the storm, with some having to ask the public only to dial 999 if there was a risk to life. London Fire Brigade declared a major incident – receiving 1,958 calls on Friday, three times more than the previous day. The ambulance service in the South Central England region declared a critical incident due to demand on its emergency services.

A gust of wind with a speed of 122 miles per hour (196 km/h) was recorded at The Needles, Isle of Wight, the fastest gust ever recorded in England, though unofficially, 40 minutes after the reading was taken, the wind gust hit 125 mph (201 km/h).

There were several casualties, including three fatalities. One person in Waterloo was injured by falling debris; another in Streatham was injured by a falling tree. Three people were taken to hospital after a car hit a tree in Bradford-on-Avon. One person was hospitalised with serious injuries after being hit by debris from a roof in Henley-on-Thames. An elderly man was injured when a section of roof was blown off the Bournemouth Sands Hotel in Westbourne.

Police in Highgate, north London, said they were called to reports of a tree falling on a car at 16:00 GMT. The woman, a passenger, was pronounced dead at the scene, while the driver, a man in his 30s, was taken to hospital. The man killed in Merseyside was a passenger in a car heading towards Aintree at about 14:10 when debris reportedly hit the windscreen, police said. Paramedics treated him at the scene, but he was pronounced dead. The driver was not injured. In Alton, Hampshire, two men were in a pickup truck when it was crushed by a falling tree. The passenger was pronounced dead at the scene while the driver was taken to hospital with serious injuries.

In London, large sections of The O2 Arena's fabric roof were torn away. Two lorries overturned on the M4 westbound between Margam and Port Talbot. The storm blew the top of the spire off Church of St Thomas, Wells, Somerset. The de Havilland Venom display plane outside Grove Business Park, Wantage, Oxfordshire collapsed in high winds. In Reading, The Cartwheeling Boys statue collapsed in a pile of rubble. One of the three towers at Grain Power Station collapsed, and the power station was taken offline for safety. The early 21st century bandstand at the De La Warr Pavilion on Bexhill-on-Sea seafront in East Sussex was destroyed. Cladding on a Leeds tower block was ripped off. Preston Railway Station was evacuated after the roof suffered structural damage. The station was subsequently deemed unsafe, with Network Rail warning passengers to avoid it. It was partially reopened the next day, with only three of the six platforms in use. A part of the lion enclosure’s fence at Africa Alive! in Kessingland, Suffolk was smashed by a fallen tree; the zoo had moved the lions indoors ahead of the storm and the expected high winds, in accordance with its policy on dangerous animals. A block of flats in Gosport had its roof ripped off by the storm. Cladding on Evenlode Tower at Blackbird Leys in Oxford also came loose. A water pipe burst at Hove Lagoon in Brighton and Hove, re-flooding it after it was emptied for cleaning and possibly costing the owner thousands of pounds.

It is thought that on Friday 18 February there was a record number of homes without power, at around 1.4 million homes.

90,000 homes in South West England were left without power. In Cornwall, power outages affected Bossiney, Lanarth, Marazion and Trevarrack. Dorset was heavily affected by the storm. The Sandbanks Ferry service was suspended. Buildings in Pokesdown were damaged, and a power cut affected Tower Park. The Isle of Portland recorded a gust of 90 miles per hour (140 km/h), which was the highest wind speed recorded on mainland Britain during the storm.

An EFL Championship game between AFC Bournemouth and Nottingham Forest scheduled for the evening of 18 February was postponed because of damage to Bournemouth’s ground, the Vitality Stadium, caused by the storm.

Trains were cancelled and delayed across the UK (including the complete cancellation of services in Wales). More than 430 flights due to take off or land at UK airports were cancelled on Friday. Landings at Heathrow Airport of incoming aircraft attempting to land at the airport, including numerous go-arounds and touch-and-go landings, were live-streamed on the YouTube channel Big Jet TV, leading to global media coverage.

On 19 February, a yellow warning was issued in southern Wales and the coast of South West England for wind and another for ice in Flintshire. The Prince of Wales Bridge was reopened, however the Severn Bridge remained closed due to forecast of high winds.

As of 20 February, there were still 83,000 homes without power across the United Kingdom: 29,000 in South West England; 23,000 in South East England; 20,000 in South England; 7,000 in Eastern England; and around 3,000 in South Wales.

On 20 February, Storm Franklin was named by the Met Office, and was expected to hamper recovery efforts from Storm Eunice. However, the storm was not as intense as Storm Eunice.

== Highest wind gust per country ==
Country	Gust	Location	Date
Austria	142 km/h	Watzespitze	19 February
Belgium	144 km/h	Knokke-Heist	18 February
Czech Republic	164 km/h	Sněžka	19 February
Denmark	135 km/h	Gedser Odde	19 February
France	176 km/h	Cap Gris Nez	18 February
Germany	162 km/h	Leuchtturm Alte Weser	18 February
Guernsey	186 km/h	Albecq, Castel	18 February
Ireland	172 km/h	Fastnet Lighthouse	17 February
Jersey	176 km/h	Trinity	18 February
Liechtenstein	126 km/h	Eschen	19 February
Lithuania	121 km/h	Klaipėda	19 February
Luxembourg	130 km/h	Wincrange	18 February
Netherlands	145 km/h	Cabauw	18 February
Norway	142 km/h	Loshavn	18 February
Poland	162 km/h	Łeba	19 February
Sweden	144 km/h	Skanör	19 February
Switzerland	148 km/h	Aletsch Glacier	19 February
United Kingdom	196 km/h	The Needles	18 February

== See also ==
- Weather of 2022
- 2021–2022 European windstorm season
- Storm Dudley, an extratropical cyclone that affected Northern England and Scotland two days earlier.
- Storm Franklin, the third storm which hit the United Kingdom within a week.
