= Storm Franklin =

Storm that impacted Europe in 2022

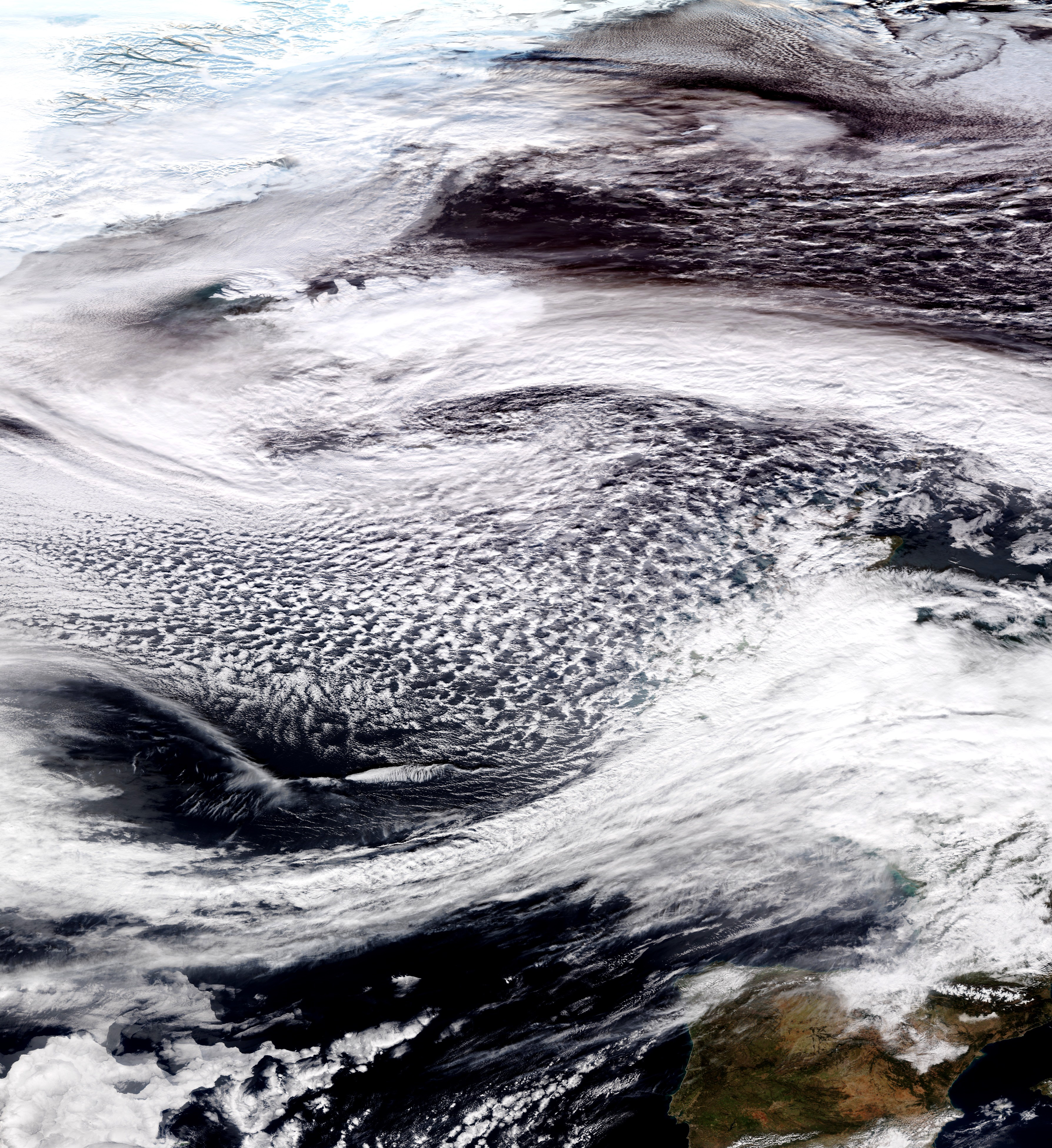

Meteorological history
- Formed: 20 February 2022
- Dissipated: 22 February 2022

Meteorological information
- Highest gusts: 95 mph (153 km/h)
- Lowest pressure: 952 mb (952 hPa)
- Max. rainfall: 130 mm (5.1 in) (Seathwaite, Cumberland)

Overall effects
- Damage: $811 million (2022 USD)
- Areas affected: United Kingdom; Ireland; France; The Netherlands; Germany
- Part of the 2021–22 European windstorm season

Storm Franklin, known in Germany as Storm Antonia, was an extratropical cyclone which caused immense damage throughout Western Europe. The most intense storm of the 2021–22 European windstorm season, Franklin was first noted by the United Kingdom's Met Office on 12:00 UTC on February 19. The next day, the Met Office would name it Franklin. Franklin would be last noted on February 22.

Franklin would be the third windstorm in a week to be named by the Met Office, the first time since they started naming windstorms in 2015. In total, Franklin would cause around $811 million (2022 USD) in damages.

== Preparations and impact ==
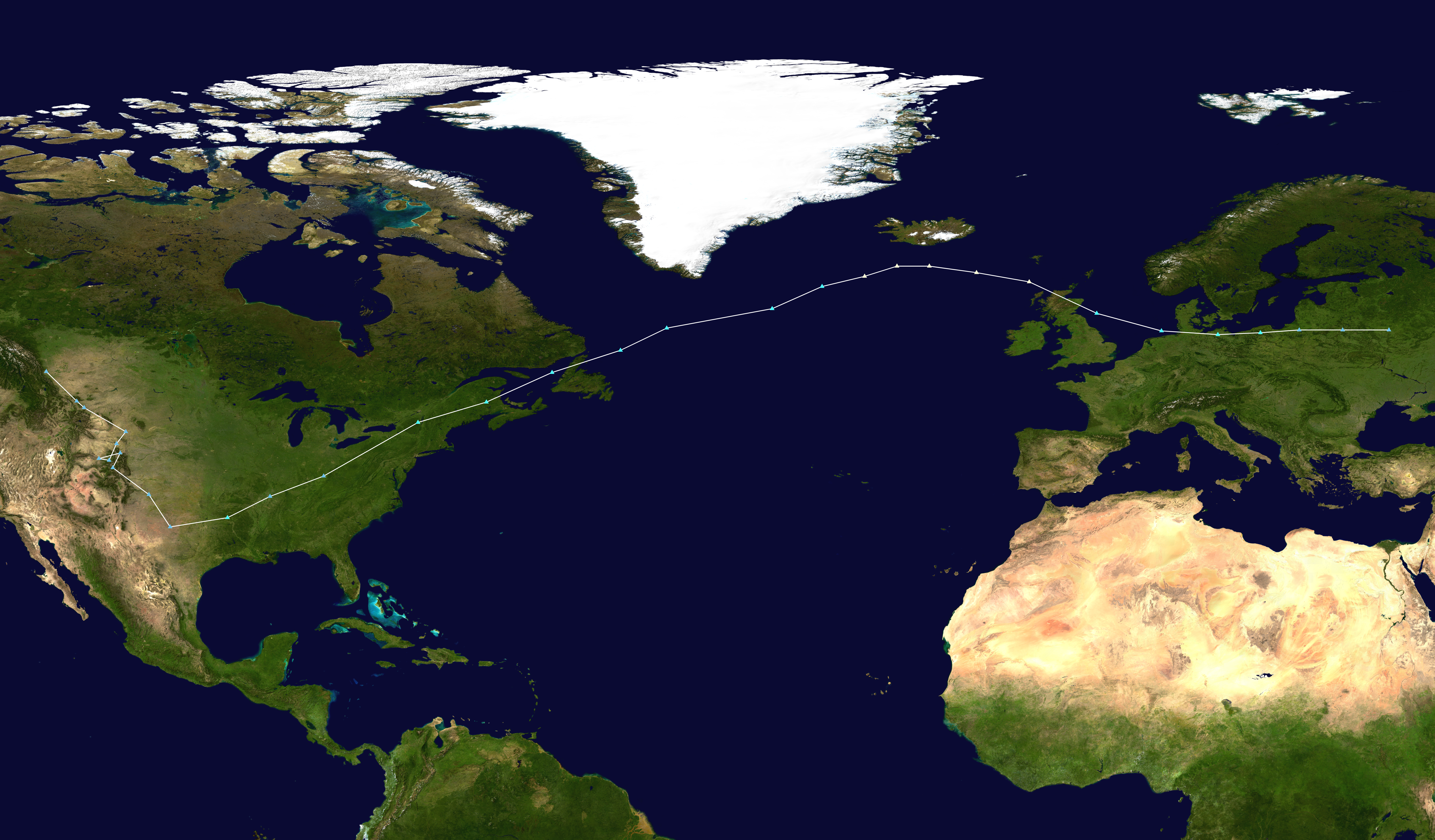
Map plotting the storm's track and intensity, according to the Saffir–Simpson scale Map key Saffir–Simpson scale Tropical depression (≤38 mph, ≤62 km/h) Tropical storm (39–73 mph, 63–118 km/h) Category 1 (74–95 mph, 119–153 km/h) Category 2 (96–110 mph, 154–177 km/h) Category 3 (111–129 mph, 178–208 km/h) Category 4 (130–156 mph, 209–251 km/h) Category 5 (≥157 mph, ≥252 km/h) Unknown Storm type Tropical cyclone Subtropical cyclone Extratropical cyclone, remnant low, tropical disturbance, or monsoon depression

=== United Kingdom ===
In preparation for Franklin, several rail companies would delay or cancel some of their scheduled train rides. Additionally, Rotterham Central station was briefly closed due to flooding. Additionally, the Met Office issued dozens of warnings across the UK as Franklin neared the nation. Franklin would cause torrential rain throughout the UK, with 130 mm (5.1 in) recorded in Seathwaite, Cumberland. Sixty properties in Yorkshire would be flooded.

=== Ireland ===
On February 20, the Met Office would issue several "amber" wind warnings for the Irish provinces of Ulster and Connacht, expecting Franklin to bring high winds, flooding, and sleet to those provinces. When Franklin impacted the nation, more than 29 thousand people would lose power.

=== Germany ===
The German Weather Service would issue a red alert for portions of Germany due to Franklins expected impact. Franklin would primarily exacerbate the damage caused by Dudley and Eunice, causing flooding throughout the nation. The German rail operator, Deutsche Bahn, would shut down its regional services in North Rhine-Westphalia on February 20, cancelling and delaying several trips.

=== Elsewhere ===
Franklin would cause two fatalities in Normandy, France. Franklin would also cause localized flooding in Belgium and the Netherlands. Due to Franklin, the ferry between Rostock and Denmark was temporarily suspended.

== Highest wind gust per country ==
Country	Gust	Location
Belgium	142 km/h (88 mph)	Zeebrugge
Denmark	106 km/h (66 mph)	Gedser Odde
France	144 km/h (89 mph)	Calais
Germany	150 km/h (93 mph)	Feldberg, Schwarzwald
Ireland	145 km/h (90 mph)	Hook Lighthouse
Luxembourg	102 km/h (63 mph)	Goesdorf
Netherlands	140 km/h (87 mph)	Westkapelle
United Kingdom	146 km/h (91 mph)	Felixstowe
