= Kolonia Kokanin =

- Village
- Location within Poland
- Coordinates: 51°50′N 18°5′E
- Country: Poland
- Voivodeship: Greater Poland
- County: Kalisz
- Gmina: Żelazków

Kolonia Kokanin [kɔˈlɔɲa kɔˈkanin] is a village in the administrative district of Gmina Żelazków, within Kalisz County, Greater Poland Voivodeship, in west-central Poland.
