= Witoldów, Greater Poland Voivodeship =

Witoldów
- Village
- Location within Poland
- Coordinates: 51°51′26″N 18°5′47″E
- Country: Poland
- Voivodeship: Greater Poland
- County: Kalisz
- Gmina: Żelazków
- Population: 100

Witoldów (Polish pronunciation: [viˈtɔlduf]) is a village in the administrative district of Gmina Żelazków, within Kalisz County, Greater Poland Voivodeship, in west-central Poland.
