= Czartki, Kalisz County =

Czartki
- Village
- Location within Poland
- Coordinates: 51°50′N 18°9′E
- Country: Poland
- Voivodeship: Greater Poland
- County: Kalisz
- Gmina: Żelazków

Czartki [ˈt͡ʂartki] is a village in the administrative district of Gmina Żelazków, within Kalisz County, Greater Poland Voivodeship, in west-central Poland.
