= Długa Wieś Pierwsza =

- Village
- Location within Poland
- Coordinates: 51°55′N 18°4′E
- Country: Poland
- Voivodeship: Greater Poland
- County: Kalisz
- Gmina: Stawiszyn

Długa Wieś Pierwsza [ˈdwuɡa ˈvjɛɕ ˈpjɛrfʂa] (literal translation: The First Long Village) is a village in the administrative district of Gmina Stawiszyn, within Kalisz County, Greater Poland Voivodeship, in west-central Poland.
