= Szosa Turecka =

- Village
- Location within Poland
- Coordinates: 51°46′54″N 18°07′45″E
- Country: Poland
- Voivodeship: Greater Poland
- County: Kalisz
- Gmina: Żelazków

Szosa Turecka [ˈʂɔsa tuˈrɛt͡ska] is a village in the administrative district of Gmina Żelazków, within Kalisz County, Greater Poland Voivodeship, in west-central Poland.
