= Długa Wieś Trzecia =

- Village
- Location within Poland
- Coordinates: 51°55′32″N 18°04′25″E
- Country: Poland
- Voivodeship: Greater Poland
- County: Kalisz
- Gmina: Stawiszyn

Długa Wieś Trzecia [ˈdwuɡa ˈvjɛɕ ˈtʂɛt͡ɕa] is a village in the administrative district of Gmina Stawiszyn, within Kalisz County, Greater Poland Voivodeship, in west-central Poland.
