= Helenów, Gmina Żelazków =

Helenów
- Village
- Location within Poland
- Coordinates: 51°51′01″N 18°06′21″E
- Country: Poland
- Voivodeship: Greater Poland
- County: Kalisz
- Gmina: Żelazków
- Time zone: UTC+1 (CET)
  - Summer (DST): UTC+2 (CEST)

Helenów [xɛˈlɛnuf] is a village in the administrative district of Gmina Żelazków, within Kalisz County, Greater Poland Voivodeship, in central Poland.
