= Stanisław Marucha =

Polish sports shooter

Personal information
- Born: 17 January 1937 Tykadłów, Poland
- Died: 26 September 2008 (aged 71) Lubuskie, Poland

Sport
- Sport: Sports shooting

Stanisław Marucha (17 January 1937 – 26 September 2008) was a Polish sports shooter. He competed at the 1964 Summer Olympics and the 1976 Summer Olympics.
