= Kokanin =

- Village
- Location within Poland
- Coordinates: 51°48′41″N 18°5′42″E
- Country: Poland
- Voivodeship: Greater Poland
- County: Kalisz
- Gmina: Żelazków

Kokanin [kɔˈkanin] is a village in the administrative district of Gmina Żelazków, within Kalisz County, Greater Poland Voivodeship, in west-central Poland.
