= Zbiersk =

- Village
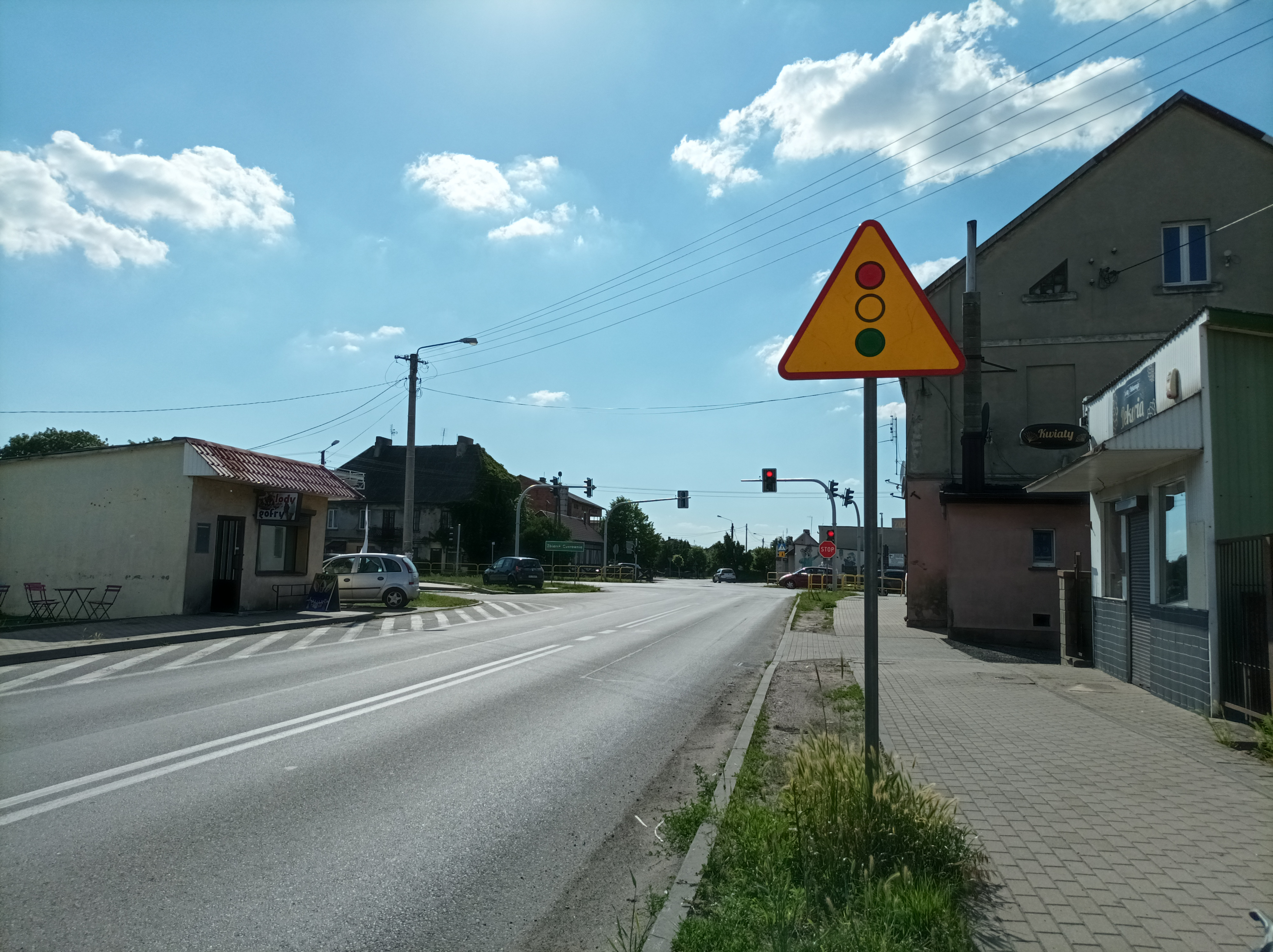
- Centre of Zbiersk

- Location within Poland
- Coordinates: 51°58′N 18°8′E
- Country: Poland
- Voivodeship: Greater Poland
- County: Kalisz
- Gmina: Stawiszyn

Population
  - Total: 2,443

Zbiersk [zbjɛrsk] is a village in the administrative district of Gmina Stawiszyn, within Kalisz County, Greater Poland Voivodeship, in west-central Poland.

== Climate ==
On 29 July 1921, Zbiersk recorded a temperature of 40.0 °C (104.0 °F). Although higher temperatures were recorded in Poland that day, at the time they were in German territory, so Zbiersk had recorded what was then the highest temperature in Poland.

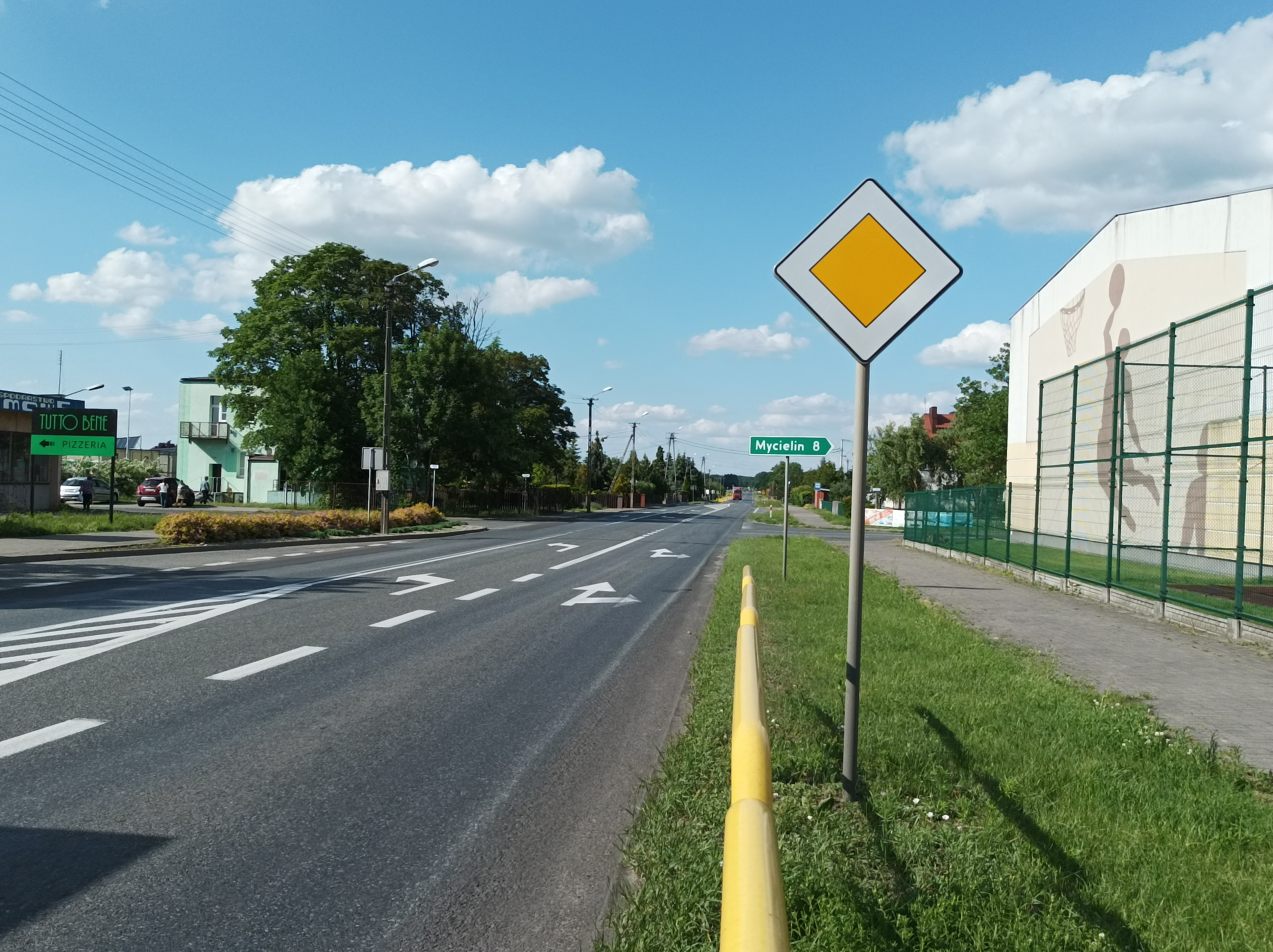
Polish National Road 25 in Zbiersk
