= Anielin, Kalisz County =

Anielin
- Village
- Location within Poland
- Coordinates: 51°52′N 18°6′E
- Country: Poland
- Voivodeship: Greater Poland
- County: Kalisz
- Gmina: Żelazków
- Population: 60

Anielin [aˈɲɛlin] is a village in the administrative district of Gmina Żelazków, within Kalisz County, Greater Poland Voivodeship, in west-central Poland.
