= Florentyna, Greater Poland Voivodeship =

Florentyna
- Village
- Location within Poland
- Coordinates: 51°49′11″N 18°10′41″E
- Country: Poland
- Voivodeship: Greater Poland
- County: Kalisz
- Gmina: Żelazków

Florentyna [flɔrɛnˈtɨna] is a village in the administrative district of Gmina Żelazków, within Kalisz County, Greater Poland Voivodeship, in west-central Poland.
