= Stary Kiączyn =

- Village
- Location within Poland
- Coordinates: 51°56′1″N 18°7′44″E
- Country: Poland
- Voivodeship: Greater Poland
- County: Kalisz
- Gmina: Stawiszyn

Stary Kiączyn [ˈstarɨ ˈkʲɔnt͡ʂɨn] is a village in the administrative district of Gmina Stawiszyn, within Kalisz County, Greater Poland Voivodeship, in west-central Poland.
