= Janków, Kalisz County =

Janków
- Village
- Location within Poland
- Coordinates: 51°52′09″N 18°13′21″E
- Country: Poland
- Voivodeship: Greater Poland
- County: Kalisz
- Gmina: Żelazków

Janków [ˈjankuf] is a village in the administrative district of Gmina Żelazków, within Kalisz County, Greater Poland Voivodeship, in west-central Poland.
