= Niedźwiady, Kalisz County =

Niedźwiady
- Village
- Location within Poland
- Coordinates: 51°48′4″N 18°5′34″E
- Country: Poland
- Voivodeship: Greater Poland
- County: Kalisz
- Gmina: Żelazków
- Population: 310

Niedźwiady [ɲɛd͡ʑˈvjadɨ] is a village in the administrative district of Gmina Żelazków, within Kalisz County, Greater Poland Voivodeship, in west-central Poland.
