= Koronka, Greater Poland Voivodeship =

Koronka
- Village
- Location within Poland
- Coordinates: 51°48′55″N 18°7′47″E
- Country: Poland
- Voivodeship: Greater Poland
- County: Kalisz
- Gmina: Żelazków
- Population: 90

Koronka [kɔˈrɔnka] is a village in the administrative district of Gmina Żelazków, within Kalisz County, Greater Poland Voivodeship, in west-central Poland.
