= Skarszewek =

- Village
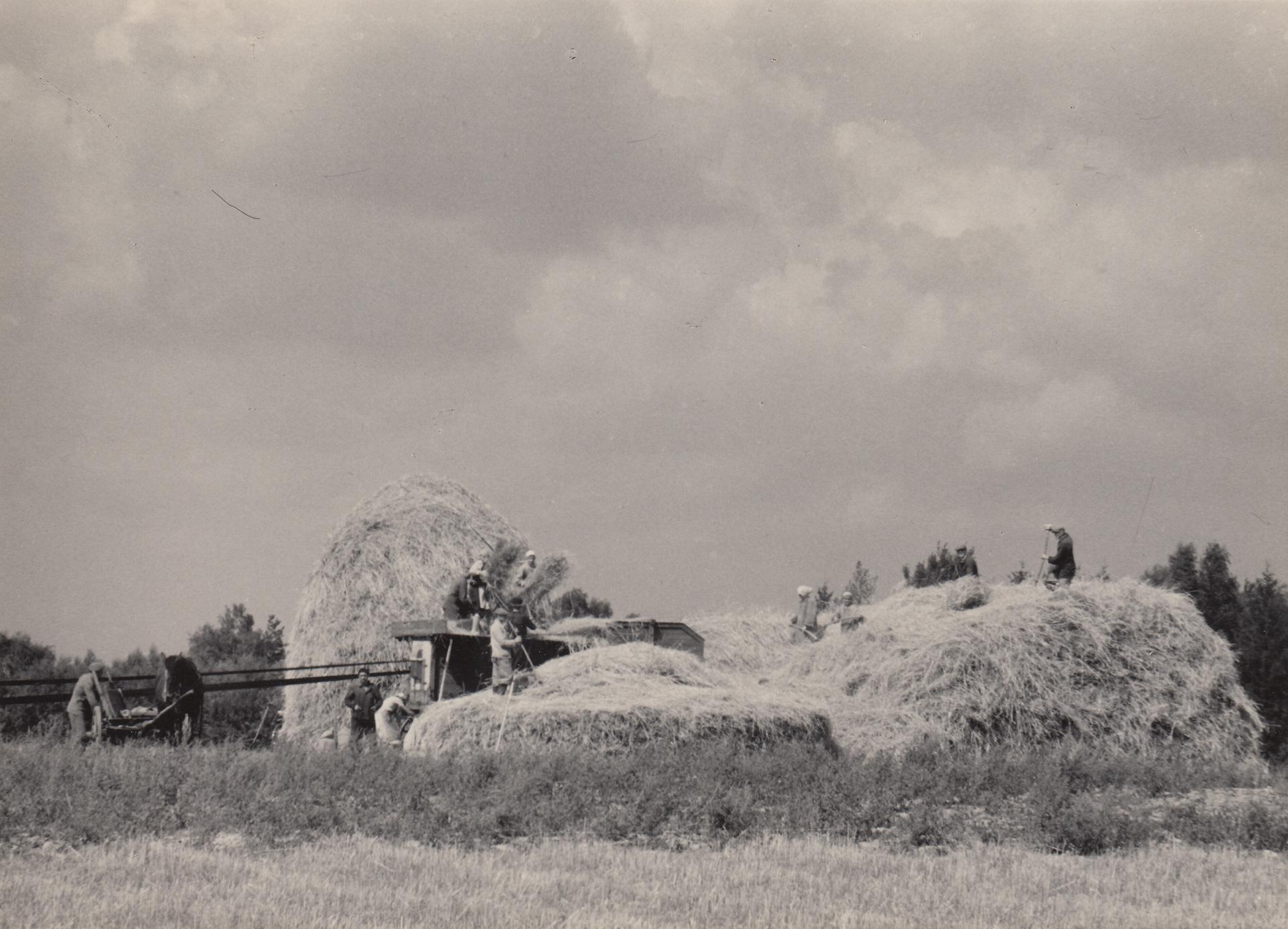
- Skarszewek in the 1950s

- Location within Poland
- Coordinates: 51°48′N 18°9′E
- Country: Poland
- Voivodeship: Greater Poland
- County: Kalisz
- Gmina: Żelazków
- Time zone: UTC+1 (CET)
  - Summer (DST): UTC+2 (CEST)
- Postal code: 62-817
- Vehicle registration: PKL

Skarszewek [skarˈʂɛvɛk] is a village in the administrative district of Gmina Żelazków, within Kalisz County, Greater Poland Voivodeship, in central Poland.
