= Wyrów, Greater Poland Voivodeship =

Wyrów
- Village
- Location within Poland
- Coordinates: 51°54′N 18°7′E
- Country: Poland
- Voivodeship: Greater Poland
- County: Kalisz
- Gmina: Stawiszyn

Wyrów [ˈvɨruf] is a village in the administrative district of Gmina Stawiszyn, within Kalisz County, Greater Poland Voivodeship, in west-central Poland.
