= Kolonia Skarszewek =

- Village
- Location within Poland
- Coordinates: 51°48′20″N 18°09′59″E
- Country: Poland
- Voivodeship: Greater Poland
- County: Kalisz
- Gmina: Żelazków

Kolonia Skarszewek [kɔˈlɔɲa skarˈʂɛvɛk] is a village in the administrative district of Gmina Żelazków, within Kalisz County, Greater Poland Voivodeship, in west-central Poland.
