= Werginki =

- Village
- Location within Poland
- Coordinates: 51°53′46″N 18°07′39″E
- Country: Poland
- Voivodeship: Greater Poland
- County: Kalisz
- Gmina: Stawiszyn

Werginki [vɛrˈɡinki] is a village in the administrative district of Gmina Stawiszyn, within Kalisz County, Greater Poland Voivodeship, in west-central Poland.
