= Stary Borków =

- Village
- Location within Poland
- Coordinates: 51°50′N 18°8′E
- Country: Poland
- Voivodeship: Greater Poland
- County: Kalisz
- Gmina: Żelazków
- Population (approx.): 390

Stary Borków [ˈstarɨ ˈbɔrkuf] is a village in the administrative district of Gmina Żelazków, within Kalisz County, Greater Poland Voivodeship, in west-central Poland.

The village has an approximate population of 390.
