= Russówek =

- Village
- Location within Poland
- Coordinates: 51°51′10″N 18°4′19″E
- Country: Poland
- Voivodeship: Greater Poland
- County: Kalisz
- Gmina: Żelazków
- Population: 80

Russówek [rusˈsuvɛk] is a village in the administrative district of Gmina Żelazków, within Kalisz County, Greater Poland Voivodeship, in west-central Poland.
