= Goliszew, Greater Poland Voivodeship =

Goliszew
- Village
- Location within Poland
- Coordinates: 51°53′N 18°11′E
- Country: Poland
- Voivodeship: Greater Poland
- County: Kalisz
- Gmina: Żelazków

Goliszew [ɡɔˈliʂɛf] is a village in the administrative district of Gmina Żelazków, within Kalisz County, Greater Poland Voivodeship, in west-central Poland.
