= Ostrówek, Kalisz County =

Ostrówek
- Village
- Location within Poland
- Coordinates: 51°54′6″N 18°8′31″E
- Country: Poland
- Voivodeship: Greater Poland
- County: Kalisz
- Gmina: Stawiszyn
- Population: 60
- Time zone: UTC+1 (CET)
  - Summer (DST): UTC+2 (CEST)

Ostrówek [ɔsˈtruvɛk] is a village in the administrative district of Gmina Stawiszyn, within Kalisz County, Greater Poland Voivodeship, in central Poland.
