= Chrusty, Gmina Żelazków =

Chrusty
- Village
- Location within Poland
- Coordinates: 51°47′13″N 18°06′56″E
- Country: Poland
- Voivodeship: Greater Poland
- County: Kalisz
- Gmina: Żelazków

Chrusty [ˈxrustɨ] is a village in the administrative district of Gmina Żelazków, within Kalisz County, Greater Poland Voivodeship, in west-central Poland.
