= Gmina Stawiszyn =

Gmina Stawiszyn Stawiszyn Commune
- Gmina
- Flag Coat of arms

- Coordinates (Stawiszyn): 51°55′6″N 18°6′41″E
- Country: Poland
- Voivodeship: Greater Poland
- County: Kalisz County
- Seat: Stawiszyn

Area
  - Total: 78.27 km^{2} (30.22 sq mi)

Population (2006)
  - Total: 7,244
  - Density: 92.55/km^{2} (239.7/sq mi)
  - Urban: 1,554
  - Rural: 5,690
- Website: http://www.stawiszyn.pl

Gmina Stawiszyn is an urban-rural gmina (administrative district) in Kalisz County, Greater Poland Voivodeship, in west-central Poland. Its seat is the town of Stawiszyn, which lies approximately 18 kilometres (11 mi) north of Kalisz and 98 km (61 mi) south-east of the regional capital Poznań.

The gmina covers an area of 78.27 square kilometres (30.2 sq mi), and as of 2006 its total population was 7,244, of which 1,554 lived in Stawiszyn and 5,690 resided in the rural areas of the gmina.

== Villages ==
Apart from the town of Stawiszyn, Gmina Stawiszyn contains the villages and settlements of Długa Wieś Druga, Długa Wieś Pierwsza, Długa Wieś Trzecia, Łyczyn, Miedza, Nowy Kiączyn, Ostrówek, Petryki, Piątek Mały, Piątek Mały-Kolonia, Piątek Wielki, Pólko, Stary Kiączyn, Werginki, Wyrów, Zbiersk, Zbiersk-Cukrownia, Zbiersk-Kolonia and Złotniki Małe-Kolonia.

== Neighbouring gminas ==
Gmina Stawiszyn is bordered by the gminas of Blizanów, Grodziec, Mycielin, Rychwał and Żelazków.

== Gallery ==
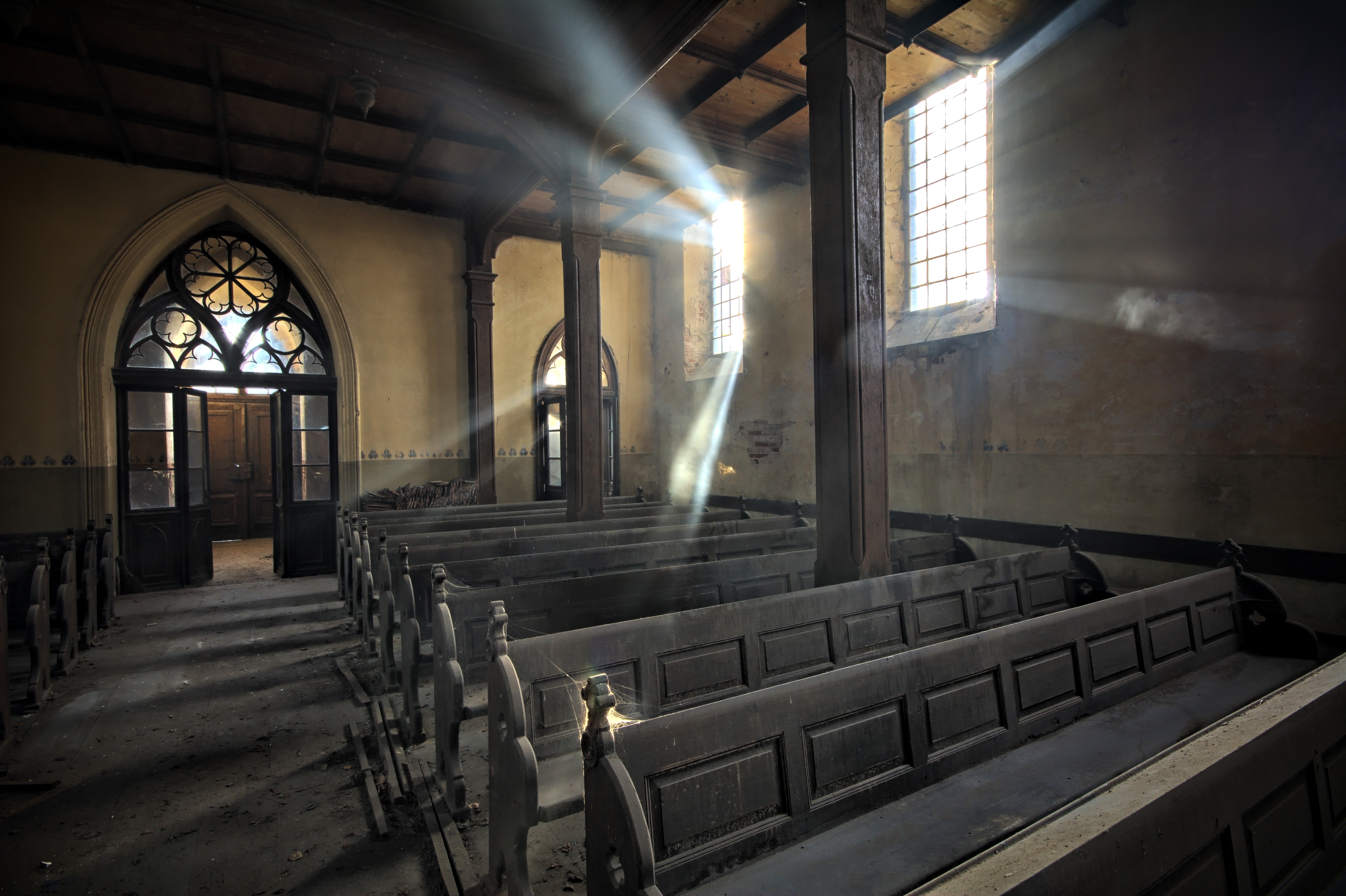
An inside view of Evangelical Church of the Augsburg Confession
