= Pólko, Gmina Żelazków =

Pólko
- Village
- Location within Poland
- Coordinates: 51°47′01″N 18°08′03″E
- Country: Poland
- Voivodeship: Greater Poland
- County: Kalisz
- Gmina: Żelazków

Pólko [ˈpulkɔ] is a village in the administrative district of Gmina Żelazków, within Kalisz County, Greater Poland Voivodeship, in west-central Poland.
