= Żelazków, Kalisz County =

Żelazków
- Village
- Location within Poland
- Coordinates: 51°51′N 18°10′E
- Country: Poland
- Voivodeship: Greater Poland
- County: Kalisz
- Gmina: Żelazków
- Population: 1,250

Żelazków [ʐɛˈlaskuf] is a village in Kalisz County, Greater Poland Voivodeship, in west-central Poland. It is the seat of the gmina (administrative district) called Gmina Żelazków.
