= Tykadłów =

- Village
- Location within Poland
- Coordinates: 51°52′N 18°8′E
- Country: Poland
- Voivodeship: Greater Poland
- County: Kalisz
- Gmina: Żelazków

Tykadłów [tɨˈkadwuf] is a village in the administrative district of Gmina Żelazków, within Kalisz County, Greater Poland Voivodeship, in west-central Poland. Olympian Stanisław Marucha was born here.
