= Dębe, Kalisz County =

Dębe
- Village
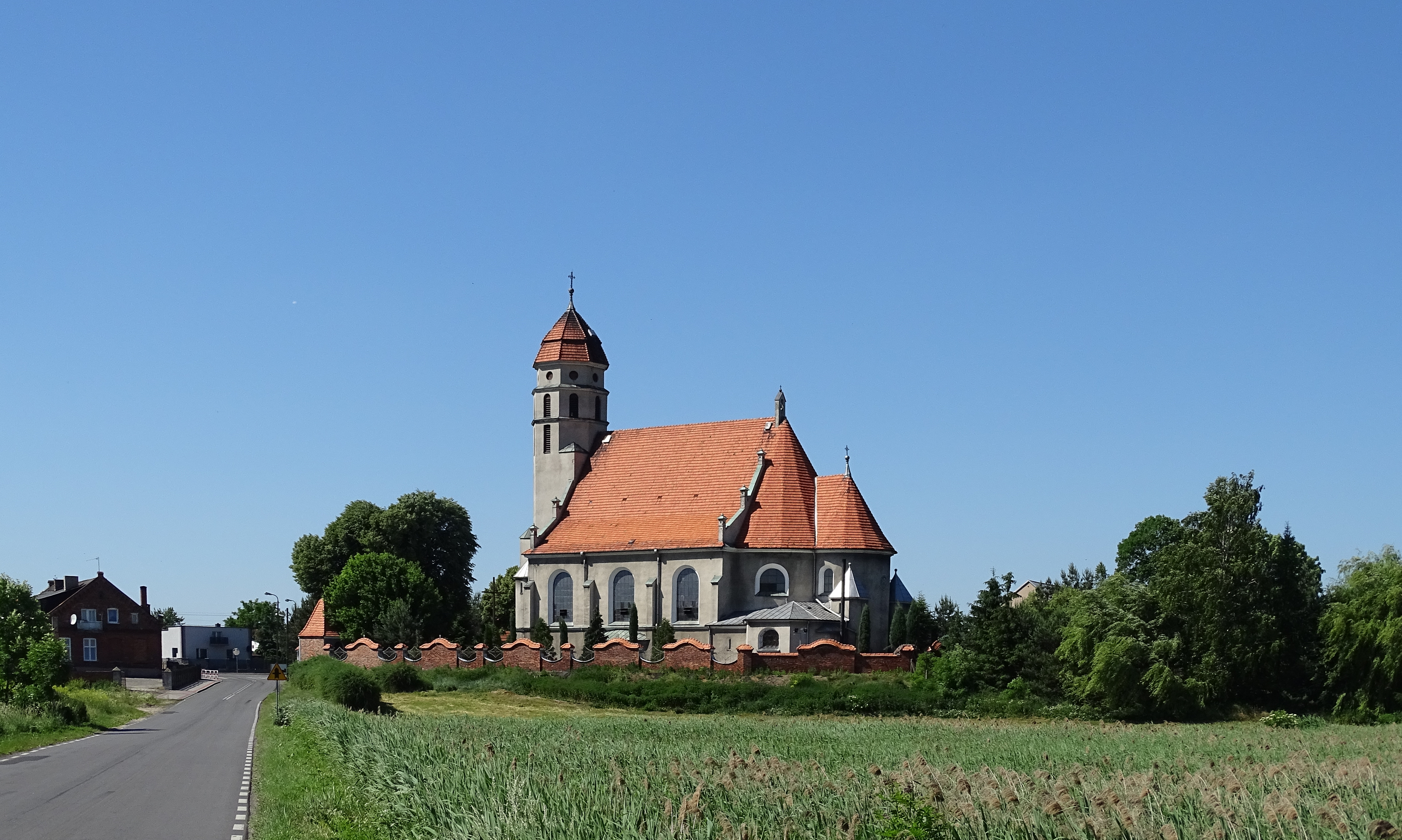
- Parish church

- Location within Poland
- Coordinates: 51°48′N 18°12′E
- Country: Poland
- Voivodeship: Greater Poland
- County: Kalisz
- Gmina: Żelazków

Population (approx.)
  - Total: 700
- Postal code: 62-817
- Vehicle registration: PKL

Dębe [ˈdɛmbɛ] is a village in the administrative district of Gmina Żelazków, within Kalisz County, Greater Poland Voivodeship, in central Poland.

The village has an approximate population of 700.

== History ==
Following the German-Soviet invasion of Poland, which started World War II in September 1939, the village was occupied by Germany until 1945. Polish underground press was issued in Dębe.
