= Zborov (Šumperk District) =

- Municipality
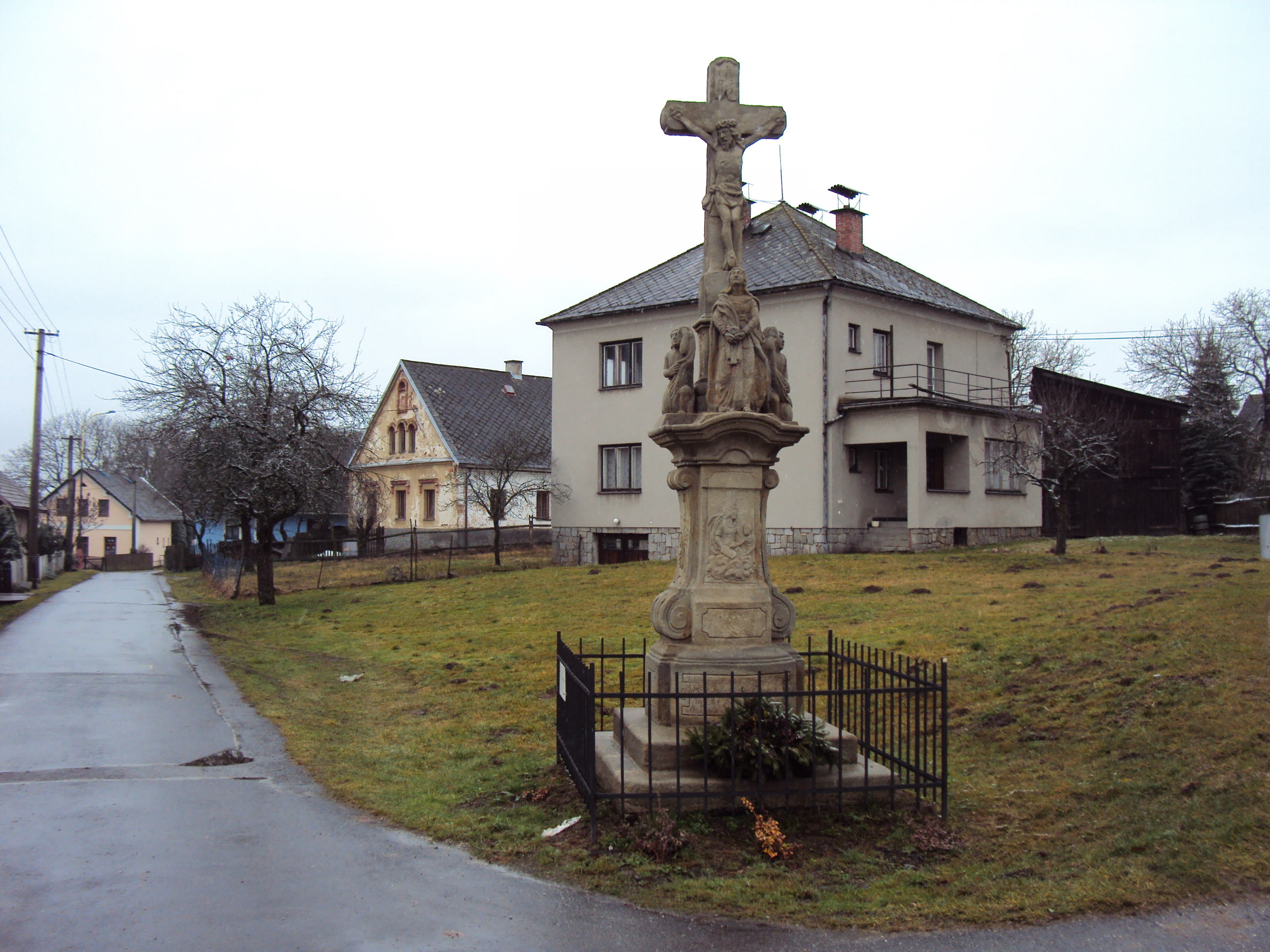
- Wayside cross

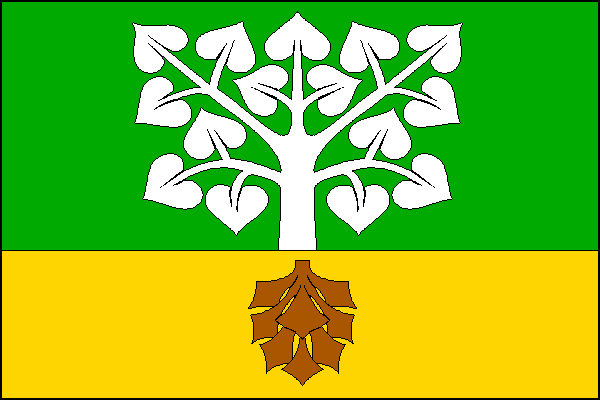
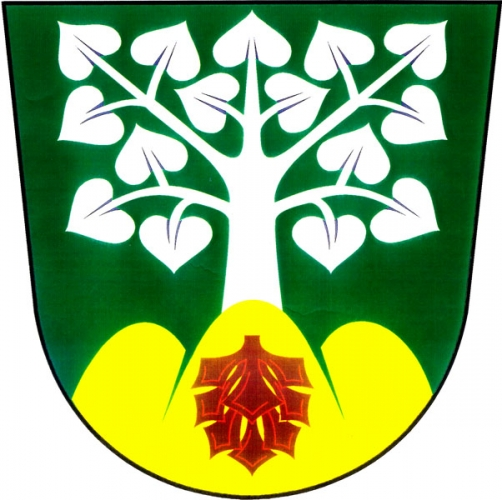
- Flag Coat of arms

- Location in the Czech Republic
- Coordinates: 49°56′37″N 16°50′9″E
- Country: Czech Republic
- Region: Olomouc
- District: Šumperk
- First mentioned: 1464

Area
  - Total: 3.15 km^{2} (1.22 sq mi)
- Elevation: 474 m (1,555 ft)

Population (2026-01-01)
  - Total: 241
  - Density: 76.5/km^{2} (198/sq mi)
- Time zone: UTC+1 (CET)
  - Summer (DST): UTC+2 (CEST)
- Postal codes: 789 01
- Website: zborov.zabrezsko.cz

Zborov is a municipality and village in Šumperk District in the Olomouc Region of the Czech Republic. It has about 200 inhabitants.

Zborov lies approximately 11 kilometres (7 mi) west of Šumperk, 50 km (31 mi) north-west of Olomouc, and 174 km (108 mi) east of Prague. The mountain Háj is situated in the area and its slope is used for skiing.

== Etymology ==
The name is derived from the personal name Zbor.

== History ==
The first written mention of Zborov is from 1464, when the village was sold to the Tunkl of Brníčko family as part of the Šilperk estate. It was merged with the Zábřeh estate, which remained so until 1848.

== Demographics ==
Historical population
Year	Pop.	±%
1869	457	—
1880	430	−5.9%
1890	389	−9.5%
1900	391	+0.5%
1910	415	+6.1%
1921	417	+0.5%
1930	378	−9.4%
1950	278	−26.5%
1961	291	+4.7%
1970	218	−25.1%
1980	246	+12.8%
1991	236	−4.1%
2001	211	−10.6%
2011	230	+9.0%
2021	209	−9.1%
Source: Censuses
