= Piątek Mały-Kolonia =

- Village
- Location within Poland
- Coordinates: 51°52′32″N 18°6′27″E
- Country: Poland
- Voivodeship: Greater Poland
- County: Kalisz
- Gmina: Stawiszyn
- Population: 200

Piątek Mały-Kolonia [ˈpjɔntɛk ˈmawɨ kɔˈlɔɲa] is a village in the administrative district of Gmina Stawiszyn, within Kalisz County, Greater Poland Voivodeship, in west-central Poland.
