= Biernatki, Kalisz County =

Biernatki
- Village
- Location within Poland
- Coordinates: 51°49′39″N 18°10′45″E
- Country: Poland
- Voivodeship: Greater Poland
- County: Kalisz
- Gmina: Żelazków
- Population: 340

Biernatki [bjɛrˈnatki] is a village in the administrative district of Gmina Żelazków, within Kalisz County, Greater Poland Voivodeship, in west-central Poland.
