= Pólko, Gmina Stawiszyn =

Pólko
- Village
- Location within Poland
- Coordinates: 51°54′16″N 18°8′5″E
- Country: Poland
- Voivodeship: Greater Poland
- County: Kalisz
- Gmina: Stawiszyn
- Population: 70

Pólko [ˈpulkɔ] is a village in the administrative district of Gmina Stawiszyn, within Kalisz County, Greater Poland Voivodeship, in west-central Poland.
