= Stawiszyn =

Town in Greater Poland Voivodeship, Poland

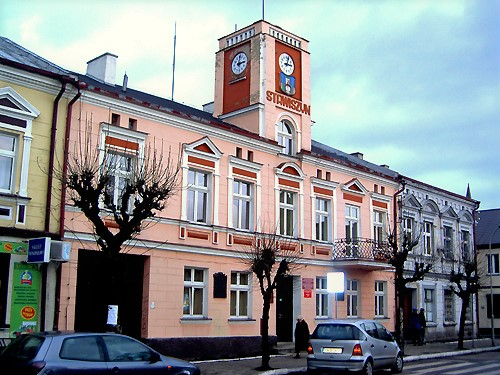
- Town hall

- Flag Coat of arms

- Location within Poland
- Coordinates: 51°55′6″N 18°6′41″E
- Country: Poland
- Voivodeship: Greater Poland
- County: Kalisz
- Gmina: Stawiszyn

Area
  - Total: 0.99 km^{2} (0.38 sq mi)

Population (2006)
  - Total: 1,554
  - Density: 1,600/km^{2} (4,100/sq mi)
- Time zone: UTC+1 (CET)
  - Summer (DST): UTC+2 (CEST)
- Postal code: 62-820
- Vehicle registration: PKA
- Climate: Dfb
- Website: http://www.stawiszyn.pl

Stawiszyn ([staˈvʲiʂɨn]) is a town in Kalisz County, Greater Poland Voivodeship, in central Poland, with 1,569 inhabitants (2006). It is the urban part of the larger Stawiszyn Commune, a mixed urban-rural municipality (gmina miejsko-wiejska). The town has a land area of only 0.99 km², and is the smallest town in geographical area in Poland.

== History ==
Stawiszyn was granted town rights before 1291. It was a royal town of the Kingdom of Poland, administratively located in the Kalisz County in the Kalisz Voivodeship in the Greater Poland Province. The 1st Polish National Cavalry Brigade was stationed in the town.

Following the German-Soviet invasion of Poland, which started World War II in September 1939, it was occupied by Germany until 1945. Two local Polish teachers were sent by the German occupiers to the Mauthausen concentration camp and murdered there. The local Polish police chief was murdered by the Russians in the Katyn massacre in 1940. In 1943, the occupiers renamed the town to Stavensheim in attempt to erase traces of Polish origin.

== Transport ==
National road 25 bypasses Stawiszyn to the west. National road connects it to Konin to the north and to Kalisz to the south.

The nearest railway station is in Kalisz.
