= Zborów, Kalisz County =

Zborów
- Village
- Location within Poland
- Coordinates: 51°50′44″N 18°11′49″E
- Country: Poland
- Voivodeship: Greater Poland
- County: Kalisz
- Gmina: Żelazków

Zborów [ˈzbɔruf] is a village (Russian:зборовь) in the administrative district of Gmina Żelazków, within Kalisz County, Greater Poland Voivodeship, in west-central Poland.
