= Piątek Wielki =

- Village
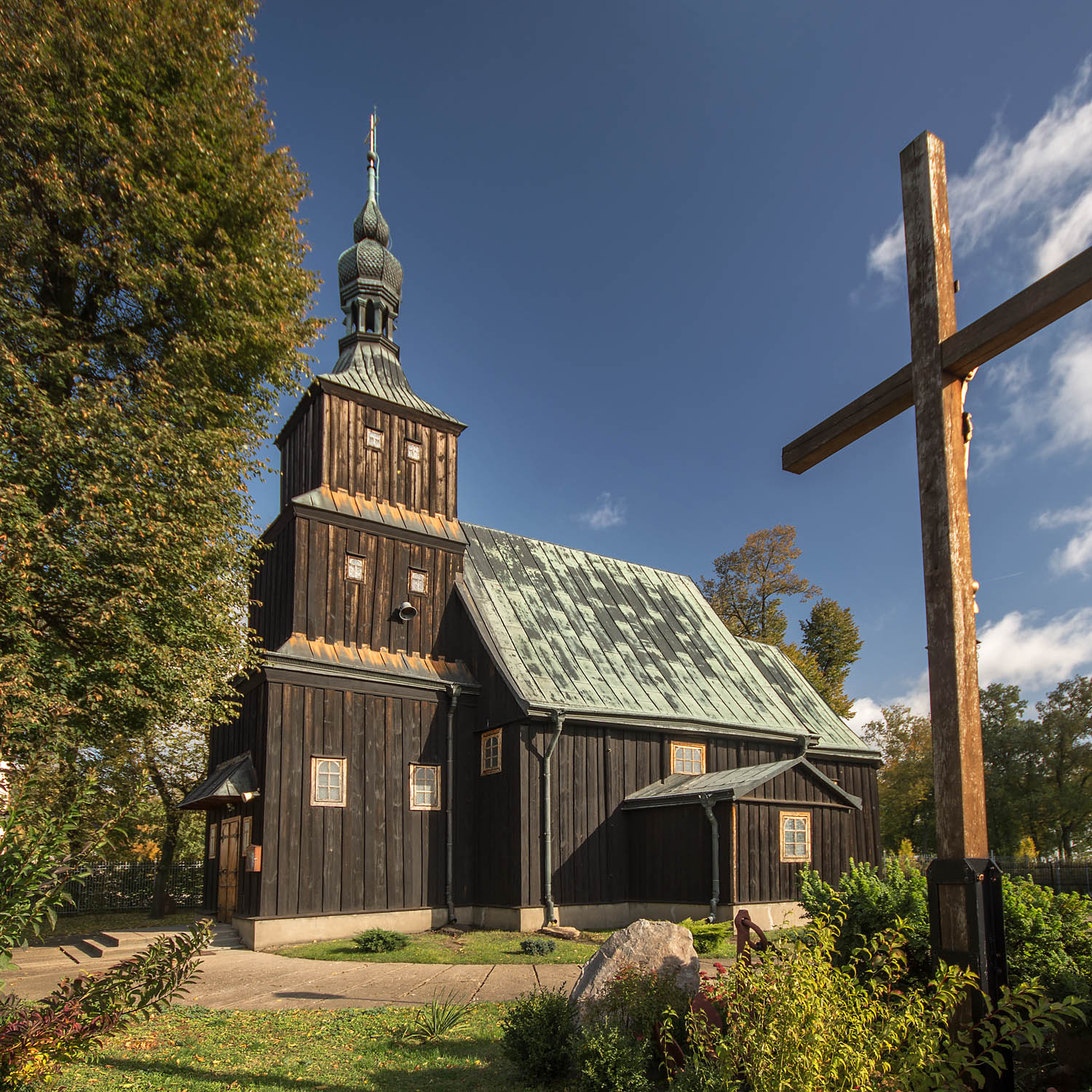
- Church of Saint Martin, the Bishop

- Location within Poland
- Coordinates: 51°54′N 18°5′E
- Country: Poland
- Voivodeship: Greater Poland
- County: Kalisz
- Gmina: Stawiszyn

Piątek Wielki (Polish pronunciation: [ˈpjɔntɛk ˈfjɛlkʲi]) is a village in the administrative district of Gmina Stawiszyn, within Kalisz County, Greater Poland Voivodeship, in west-central Poland.
