= List of Lutheran dioceses and archdioceses =

This is a list of Lutheran dioceses and archdioceses currently active, grouped by national (or regional) church, and showing the titles of the bishops of those dioceses. Where relevant, the metropolitan bishop or primate is listed first. As in other Christian denominations, many Lutheran metropolitan bishops and primate bishops bear the title archbishop.

This list does not contain historical or defunct dioceses, although links are provided (at the end of the list) to former Lutheran dioceses of particular historical note.

This list is solely for dioceses of those Lutheran churches which have retained, or established, episcopal polity. There are also many Lutheran churches with congregational polity, which do not have bishops, or who use the title bishop for their presiding officer, but in a sense other than that of the historic episcopate.

== Europe (outside Germany) ==
=== Church of Denmark ===
An established state church in Denmark and Greenland. The Bishop of Copenhagen is the Primate (Primus inter pares), but not a Metropolitan, having no actual jurisdiction superior to that of any other diocesan bishop.

- Bishop of Copenhagen (Primate, but with no authority as Metropolitan)
- Bishop of Aalborg
- Bishop of Århus
- Bishop of Fyen
- Bishop of Greenland
- Bishop of Haderslev
- Bishop of Helsingør
- Bishop of Lolland-Falster
- Bishop of Ribe
- Bishop of Roskilde
- Bishop of Viborg

=== Estonian Evangelical Lutheran Church ===
The Archbishop holds authority throughout Estonia, assisted by Bishops of regional dioceses, including the Extra-Estonian Diocese, which had been a separate church until 2010. The College of Bishops is usually larger, due to the practice of giving most retiring Bishops the status of Bishop Emeritus (or Archbishop Emeritus).

- Archbishop of Tallinn (Primate and Metropolitan) (See located at Tallinn)
- Bishop of the Western and Northern Region (See located at Haapsalu)
- Bishop of the Southern Region (See located at Tartu)

=== Church of the Faroe Islands ===
Formerly a diocese of the Church of Denmark, it is now an autonomous church consisting of a single diocese.

- Bishop of the Faroe Islands

=== Evangelical Lutheran Church of Finland ===
One of two state sanctioned national churches in Finland. The Archbishop of Turku is the Primate. In addition to the dioceses listed below there is also a "Military Bishopric", although the Ordinary is not required to be in Bishop's Orders, and may be a senior priest.

- Archbishop of Turku (Primate and Metropolitan)
- Bishop of Turku (suffragan bishop, assisting the Archbishop of Turku)
- Bishop of Espoo
- Bishop of Helsinki
- Bishop of Kuopio
- Bishop of Lapua
- Bishop of Mikkeli
- Bishop of Oulu
- Bishop of Porvoo
- Bishop of Tampere

A small group of former members of ELCF have formed an independent conservative mission diocese, the Evangelical Lutheran Mission Diocese of Finland. It is headed by its own bishop, but is not recognised by the ELCF, the Finnish Government, or the Lutheran World Federation.

=== Lutheran Church in Great Britain ===
An autonomous church structured as a single diocese.

- Bishop of Great Britain

=== Evangelical-Lutheran Church in Hungary ===
The church is led by a Presiding Bishop, who is elected from amongst the diocesan bishops, and remains a diocesan bishop in addition to his role as Primate.

- Presiding Bishop (Primate and Metropolitan) – no fixed see, elected from amongst the diocesan bishops below
- Bishop of the Northern Diocese
- Bishop of the Southern Diocese
- Bishop of the Western (Transdanubian) Diocese

=== National Church of Iceland ===
Since 1801 the Church of Iceland has been united as a single diocese. Since that year, the Bishops of Skálholt and Hólar have been suffragans to the Bishop of Iceland. They retain their respective cathedras (seats) in Skálholt Cathedral and Hólar Cathedral. The Bishop of Iceland's cathedra is located in Reykjavík Cathedral.

- Bishop of Iceland
- Bishop of Skálholt
- Bishop of Hólar

=== Evangelical Lutheran Church of Latvia ===
The Council of Bishops (of which all Latvian bishops and archbishops are members) is the highest authority in the church; the archbishop is Primate and is sometimes styled Archbishop of Riga and Latvia.

- Archbishop of Riga (Primate and Metropolitan)
- Bishop of Riga (suffragan bishop, assisting the Archbishop of Riga)
- Bishop of Daugavpils
- Bishop of Liepāja

=== Latvian Evangelical Lutheran Church Worldwide ===
An autonomous church formed as a single diocese, and operating worldwide. Originally for Latvians overseas, the church now has congregations in Latvia also, where its inclusive ordination policy contrasts with the Evangelical Lutheran Church of Latvia, which ordains only men.

- Archbishop of the LELCWW

=== Evangelical Lutheran Church of Lithuania ===
An autonomous church structured as a single diocese.

- Bishop of Lithuania

=== Church of Norway ===
Changes in 2012 and 2016 have given the church increased autonomy from the state, although it remains partially state-funded. The Preses (Presiding Bishop) is the primate and metropolitan and also has Ordinary jurisdiction over the cathedral deanery in Nidaros (Trondheim), notwithstanding the existence of a Diocesan Bishop of Nidaros (see below).

- Bishop Preses (Primate and Metropolitan)
- Bishop of Agder og Telemark
- Bishop of Bjørgvin
- Bishop of Borg
- Bishop of Hamar
- Bishop of Møre
- Bishop of Nidaros
- Bishop of Nord-Hålogaland
- Bishop of Oslo
- Bishop of Tunsberg
- Bishop of Sør-Hålogaland
- Bishop of Stavanger

=== Evangelical Church of the Augsburg Confession in Poland ===
The Bishop of the Church is an elective leader of the denomination, described as a 'pastor of the pastors' (Pastor pastorum), and is based in Warsaw.

- Bishop of the Church
  - Bishop of Cieszyn
  - Bishop of Katowice
  - Bishop of Masuria
  - Bishop of Pomerania-Greater Poland
  - Bishop of Warsaw
  - Bishop of Wrocław

=== Evangelical Lutheran Church in Russia, Ukraine, Kazakhstan and Central Asia (ELCROS) ===
With its origins in several separate denominations within the former Soviet Union, this has been a united church since 1999. The Primate is based in St Petersburg.

- Archbishop of St. Petersburg (Russia) (Primate)
- Bishop of Evangelical-Lutheran Church in European Russia (Russia) (Cathedral in Moscow)
- Bishop of Evangelical-Lutheran Church of the Urals, Siberia and the Far East (Russia)
- Bishop of Union of Evangelical-Lutheran Church Congregations in Belorussia (Belarus)
- Bishop of Evangelical-Lutheran Church in Georgia (Georgia)
- Bishop of Evangelical-Lutheran Church in Kazakhstan (Kazakhstan)
- Bishop of Evangelical-Lutheran Church in the Kyrgyz Republic (Kyrgyzstan)
- Bishop of Evangelical-Lutheran Church in Uzbekistan (Uzbekistan)
- Bishop of German Evangelical-Lutheran Church in Ukraine (Ukraine)

=== Evangelical Lutheran Church of Ingria in Russia (ELCI) ===
A single-diocese church. Unlike ELCROS (above) the ELCI does not ordain women.

- Bishop of the ELCI

=== Church of Sweden ===
The largest Lutheran church in Europe. The Archbishop of Uppsala is the primate and metropolitan; although also the Ordinary (diocesan bishop) of Uppsala, much of this work is legally delegated to the Bishop of Uppsala, a suffragan bishop who functions as the effective diocesan bishop. There are 13 dioceses (listed below). Additionally the Church of Sweden Abroad forms a 14th jurisdiction, consisting of 45 churches, in 3 deaneries, all outside Sweden; it is under the episcopal oversight of the Bishop of Visby.

- Archbishop of Uppsala (Primate and Metropolitan)
- Bishop of Uppsala (suffragan bishop with extensive delegated authority from the Archbishop)
- Bishop of Gothenburg
- Bishop of Härnösand
- Bishop of Karlstad
- Bishop of Linköping
- Bishop of Luleå
- Bishop of Lund
- Bishop of Skara
- Bishop of Stockholm
- Bishop of Strängnäs
- Bishop of Visby
- Bishop of Västerås
- Bishop of Växjö

=== Slovak Evangelical Church of the Augsburg Confession in Serbia ===
An autonomous church structured as a single diocese.

- Bishop of Slovak Evangelical Church of the Augsburg Confession in Serbia, with a seat in Novi Sad

=== Evangelical Church of the Augsburg Confession in Slovakia ===
The church is led by a General Bishop, who is elected from amongst the diocesan bishops, and remains a diocesan bishop in addition to his role as Primate.

- General Bishop (Primate and Metropolitan) – no fixed see, elected from amongst the diocesan bishops below
- Bishop of Western district
- Bishop of Eastern district

== Germany ==
=== United Evangelical Lutheran Church of Germany ===
VELKD, established in 1948. All member churches are also members of the all-Protestant umbrella EKD. Only Lutheran member churches are listed below.

==== Single-diocese member churches ====
- State Bishop in Bavaria (Evangelical Lutheran Church in Bavaria) (Seat located in Munich)
  - Six regional bishops lead regions of the Bavarian diocese
- State bishop in Brunswick (Evangelical Lutheran State Church in Brunswick) (Seat located in Brunswick)
- State Bishop of Hanover (Evangelical-Lutheran State Church of Hanover) (Seat located in Hanover)
- State bishop of the Evangelical Church in Middle Germany (Evangelical Church in Middle Germany)
- State bishop of Saxony (Evangelical Lutheran State Church of Saxony) (Seat located in Meissen)
- State bishop of Schaumburg-Lippe (Evangelical Lutheran State Church of Schaumburg-Lippe) (Seat located in Bückeburg)

==== Evangelical Lutheran Church in Northern Germany ====
Established in 2012 from unions of several older denominations, and also part of the VELKD, but consisting of multiple internal dioceses. The State Bishop or Presiding Bishop is in overall charge. There are currently two Bishops of Mecklenburg and Pomerania (located respectively at Greifswald and Schwerin), but this is a temporary arrangement following mergers of denominations.

- Presiding bishop of the Evangelical Lutheran Church in Northern Germany. (Primate) (Seat located in Schwerin)
- Bishop of Hamburg and Lübeck (Seat located in Hamburg)
- Bishops of Mecklenburg and Pomerania. (Double staff seat located in Greifswald and Schwerin)
- Bishop of Schleswig and Holstein

=== Evangelical Lutheran Church in Oldenburg ===
- Bishop of Oldenburg (Seat located in Oldenburg in Oldenburg)

=== Evangelical State Church in Württemberg ===
The Presiding Bishop (or State Bishop) is in overall charge, with the diocese divided into regions, which function as small dioceses.

- Presiding bishop of Württemberg (Seat located in Stuttgart)
  - Regional Bishop of Heilbronn
  - Regional Bishop of Stuttgart
  - Regional Bishop of Ulm
  - Regional Bishop of Reutlingen

== Asia ==
=== United Evangelical Lutheran Churches in India ===
A group of Indian bishoprics with very different origins and founders, which retain their autonomy, but have united into a single denomination.

- Bishop of Tranquebar (Tamil Evangelical Lutheran Church)
- Bishop of the Andhra Evangelical Lutheran Church
- Bishop of the Evangelical Lutheran Church in Madhya Pradesh
- Bishop of the Gossner Evangelical Lutheran Church in Chotanagpur and Assam
- Bishop of the Jeypore Evangelical Lutheran Church
- Bishop of the South Andhra Lutheran Church

=== Protestant Christian Batak Church ===
The ephorus of HKBP is the bishop and primate of the church, elected for a period of four years. The ephorus does not have a fixed see, although the ephorus would preside from HKBP's Headquarters at Pearaja, Tarutung, North Sumatra, Indonesia. Under the ephorus, the church is organized into districts, each headed by a praeses.

- Ephorus (Bishop) of the Protestant Christian Batak Church

=== Evangelical Lutheran Church in Jordan and the Holy Land ===
A single-diocese church operating in Jordan, Israel, and Palestine.

- Bishop of the Evangelical Lutheran Church in Jordan and the Holy Land

=== Evangelical Lutheran Church in Malaysia ===
A single-diocese church operating in Malaysia. The Bishop's seat is located at Zion Cathedral, Brickfields, Kuala Lumpur.

- Bishop of the Evangelical Lutheran Church in Malaysia

== North America ==
=== Evangelical Lutheran Church in America ===
The ELCA does not have dioceses in the usual sense. However, its "synods" increasingly closely resemble a diocese in all but name, particularly since the decision in 2000 to appoint all new bishops within the historic apostolic succession, with the laying-on of hands by at least three current bishops.

- Presiding Bishop of the Evangelical Lutheran Church in America

Region 1:

- Bishop of the Alaska Synod
- Bishop of the Northwest Washington Synod
- Bishop of the Southwestern Washington Synod
- Bishop of the Eastern Washington-Idaho Synod
- Bishop of the Oregon Synod
- Bishop of the Montana Synod

Region 2:

- Bishop of the Sierra Pacific Synod
- Bishop of the Southwest California Synod
- Bishop of the Pacifica Synod
- Bishop of the Grand Canyon Synod
- Bishop of the Rocky Mountain Synod

Region 3:

- Bishop of the Western North Dakota Synod
- Bishop of the Eastern North Dakota Synod
- Bishop of the South Dakota Synod
- Bishop of the Northwestern Minnesota Synod
- Bishop of the Northeastern Minnesota Synod
- Bishop of the Southwestern Minnesota Synod
- Bishop of the Minneapolis Area Synod
- Bishop of the Saint Paul Area Synod
- Bishop of the Southeastern Minnesota Synod

Region 4:

- Bishop of the Nebraska Synod
- Bishop of the Central States Synod
- Bishop of the Arkansas-Oklahoma Synod
- Bishop of the Northern Texas-Northern Louisiana Synod
- Bishop of the Southwestern Texas Synod
- Bishop of the Texas-Louisiana Gulf Coast Synod

Region 5:

- Bishop of the Metropolitan Chicago Synod
- Bishop of the Northern Illinois Synod
- Bishop of the Central/Southern Illinois Synod
- Bishop of the Southeastern Iowa Synod
- Bishop of the Western Iowa Synod
- Bishop of the Northeastern Iowa Synod
- Bishop of the Northern Great Lakes Synod
- Bishop of the Northwest Synod of Wisconsin
- Bishop of the East Central Synod of Wisconsin
- Bishop of the Greater Milwaukee Synod
- Bishop of the South-Central Synod of Wisconsin
- Bishop of the La Crosse Area Synod

Region 6:

- Bishop of the Southeast Michigan Synod
- Bishop of the North/West Lower Michigan Synod
- Bishop of the Indiana-Kentucky Synod
- Bishop of the Northwestern Ohio Synod
- Bishop of the Northeastern Ohio Synod
- Bishop of the Southern Ohio Synod

Region 7:

- Bishop of the New Jersey Synod
- Bishop of the New England Synod
- Bishop of the Metropolitan New York Synod
- Bishop of the Upstate New York Synod
- Bishop of the Northeastern Pennsylvania Synod
- Bishop of the Southeastern Pennsylvania Synod
- Bishop of the Slovak Zion Synod

Region 8:

- Bishop of the Northwestern Pennsylvania Synod
- Bishop of the Southwestern Pennsylvania Synod
- Bishop of the Allegheny Synod
- Bishop of the Lower Susquehanna Synod
- Bishop of the Upper Susquehanna Synod
- Bishop of the Delaware-Maryland Synod
- Bishop of the Metropolitan Washington, D.C. Synod
- Bishop of the West Virginia-Western Maryland Synod

Region 9:

- Bishop of the Virginia Synod
- Bishop of the North Carolina Synod
- Bishop of the South Carolina Synod
- Bishop of the Southeastern Synod
- Bishop of the Florida-Bahamas Synod
- Bishop of the Caribbean Synod

=== Evangelical Lutheran Diocese of North America ===
- Bishop of the Evangelical Lutheran Diocese of North America

=== Evangelical Lutheran Church in Canada ===
- National Bishop of the Evangelical Lutheran Church in Canada

=== North American Lutheran Church ===
- Bishop of the North American Lutheran Church

== Africa ==
=== Evangelical Lutheran Church in Kenya ===
The Archbishop is the primate, and is also responsible for a small diocese, comprising his cathedral in Nairobi and its immediate surrounding precincts.

- Archbishop of Uhuru Highway Cathedral Diocese (Primate and Metropolitan)
- Bishop of South-west Diocese
- Bishop of Lake Diocese
- Bishop of Southern Lake Diocese
- Bishop of Central Eastern Diocese
- Bishop of Central Rift Valley Diocese
- Bishop of North-west Diocese
- Bishop of Nyamira Diocese
- Bishop of Kerio Valley Diocese

=== United Church Council of the Lutheran Churches in Namibia ===
Namibia's three Lutheran denominations have a long history of co-operation together, and in 2007 formed the United Church Council as a parent body, within which they are working towards full visible unity as a single church.

==== Evangelical Lutheran Church in Namibia ====
Working predominantly in the north of the country.

- Presiding Bishop (Primate, elected position held by one of the diocesan bishops.)
- Bishop of the Western Diocese
- Bishop of the Eastern Diocese

==== Evangelical Lutheran Church in the Republic of Namibia ====
Working predominantly in the south of the country.

- Bishop of the ELCRN

==== German-speaking Evangelical Lutheran Church in Namibia ====
Working nationwide amongst the German-speaking community.

- Bishop of the GELC

=== Lutheran Church of Christ in Nigeria ===
The Archbishop is not part of a formally constituted diocese, although he holds jurisdiction over a national arch-cathedral in Numan, which is also the location of the church's administrative headquarters.

- Archbishop of the LCC in Nigeria (Primate and Metropolitan)
- Bishop of Abuja
- Bishop of Arewa
- Bishop of Bonotem
- Bishop of Gongola
- Bishop of Mayo-Belwa
- Bishop of ShallHolma
- Bishop of Todi
- Bishop of Taraba
- Bishop of Yola

=== Evangelical Lutheran Church in Southern Africa ===
The largest Lutheran church in southern Africa is headed by a Presiding Bishop. It operates in South Africa, Botswana, Eswatini, and Lesotho. In addition to the dioceses listed below there is also a Lesotho mission area, not yet large enough to be formed into a diocese.

- Presiding Bishop (Primate and Metropolitan) – no fixed see, elected from amongst the diocesan bishops below
- Bishop of Botswana Diocese
- Bishop of Cape Orange Diocese
- Bishop of Central Diocese
- Bishop of Eastern Diocese
- Bishop of Northern Diocese
- Bishop of South Eastern Diocese
- Bishop of Western Diocese

=== Evangelical Lutheran Church in Tanzania ===
The Presiding Bishop is the primate, and may be elected from amongst all the diocesan bishops. There is no fixed see for the Presiding Bishop.

- Presiding Bishop (Primate and Metropolitan) – no fixed see, elected from amongst the diocesan bishops below
- Bishop of Central Diocese
- Bishop of Dodoma Diocese
- Bishop of East of Lake Victoria Diocese
- Bishop of Eastern and Coastal Diocese
- Bishop of Iringa Diocese
- Bishop of Karagwe Diocese
- Bishop of Konde Diocese
- Bishop of Lake Tanganyika Diocese
- Bishop of Mara Diocese
- Bishop of Mbulu Diocese
- Bishop of Meru Diocese
- Bishop of Morogoro Diocese
- Bishop of Mwanga Diocese
- Bishop of Northern Diocese
- Bishop of North-Central Diocese
- Bishop of North-Eastern Diocese
- Bishop of North-Western Diocese
- Bishop of Pare Diocese
- Bishop of Ruvuma Diocese
- Bishop of Southern Diocese
- Bishop of South-Central Diocese
- Bishop of South-East of Lake Victoria Diocese
- Bishop of South-Eastern Diocese
- Bishop of South-Western Diocese
- Bishop of Ulanga Kilombero Diocese

== Former bishoprics of historic note ==
- Bishopric of Samland (1523–1577)
- Bishopric of Pomesania (1527–1587)
- Bishopric of Schwerin (1533–1648)
- Bishopric of Lübeck (1535-1536, 1555–1803)
- Bishopric of Brandenburg (1539–1571)
- Bishopric of Naumburg (1542–1547, 1562–1615)
- Bishopric of Merseburg (1544–1565)
- Bishopric of Merseburg (1544–1549, 1562–1615)
- Bishopric of Cammin (1544–1650)
- Bishopric of Minden (1554–1631)
- Bishopric of Ratzeburg (1554–1648)
- Bishopric of Lebus (1555–1598)
- Bishopric of Havelberg (1558–1598)
- Bishopric of Ösel–Wiek (1560–1572)
- Bishopric of Courland (1560–1583)
- Bishopric of Halberstadt (1566–1628)
- Archbishopric of Magdeburg (1566–1631, 1638–1680)
- Archbishopric of Bremen (1567–1648)
- Bishopric of Verden (1574–1630)
- Bishopric of Osnabrück (1574–1623, alternating 1634–1803)

== See also ==
- List of Anglican dioceses and archdioceses
- List of Orthodox dioceses and archdioceses
- List of bishops of the United Methodist Church
- List of Unitarian bishops
- List of current patriarchs
- List of Catholic dioceses (structured view)
- List of Catholic dioceses (alphabetical)
- List of Roman Catholic archdioceses
