= Bohush =

Bohush may refer to:

- Ukrainian form of the given name Bogusz
- Bohush (surname)
- Yiddish name of the village of Bohushi, Ukraine
- Yiddish name of the town of Buhuși, Romania
- Bohush (Hasidic dynasty) originating in Buhuși
