= Vang Stave Church =

- Mountain Church of Our Savior
- Kościół Górski Naszego Zbawiciela
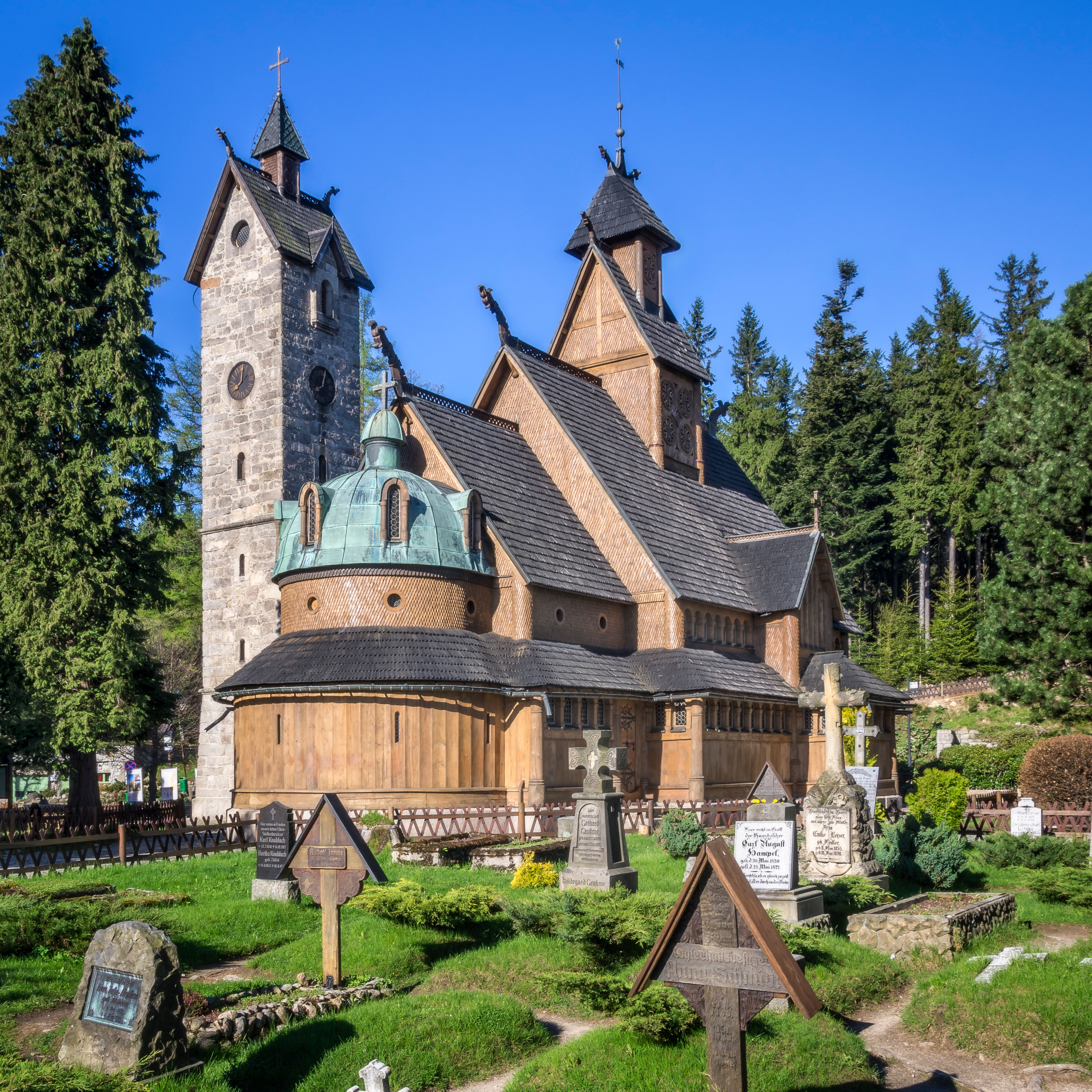

- Location of the church Vang Stave Church (Poland) Vang Stave Church (Europe)
- 50°46′49″N 15°43′26″E
- Location: Karpacz
- Country: Poland
- Denomination: Lutheran
- Website: wang.com.pl

History
- Status: Parish church
- Events: re-erected in 1842 in present location

Architecture
- Functional status: Active
- Architectural type: Stave church
- Completed: c. 1200 in Vang in the Valdres region of Norway

Specifications
- Materials: Wood

Administration
- Diocese: Wrocław
- Parish: Wang Parish in Karpacz

Vang Stave Church (Polish: Świątynia Wang; Norwegian: Vang stavkyrkje; German: Stabkirche Wang) or Mountain Church of Our Savior (Polish: Kościół Górski Naszego Zbawiciela) is a stave church located in Karpacz in the Karkonosze mountains in Poland. It was transferred to its present location from Vang Municipality in the Valdres region of Norway and re-erected in 1842. A notable tourist attraction, it is Poland's only stave church. It serves as a parish church of the Evangelical Church of the Augsburg Confession in Poland.

The church is a four-post single-nave stave church originally built around 1200 in the parish of Vang in the Valdres region of Norway.

== History ==
Originally built as a Catholic church in the Middle Ages, following the Reformation it was used by a congregation belonging to the Church of Norway. In 1832, the local council decided to pull down the stave church because it was too small and had become structurally unsafe over the years. The plans for its demolition and replacement were known already in 1826, when the painter Johan Christian Dahl made the first attempt to save it. He urged the council to repair and extend it.

There was also an attempt to have it re-erected at Heensåsen in the same parish as an annex church. Knut Nordsveen, a local farmer, offered to donate the building site to the community, but his offer was rejected. Disappointed by the rebuff, he later sold his farm and emigrated to America. In 1932, a monument was erected in memory of him.

=== Relocation ===
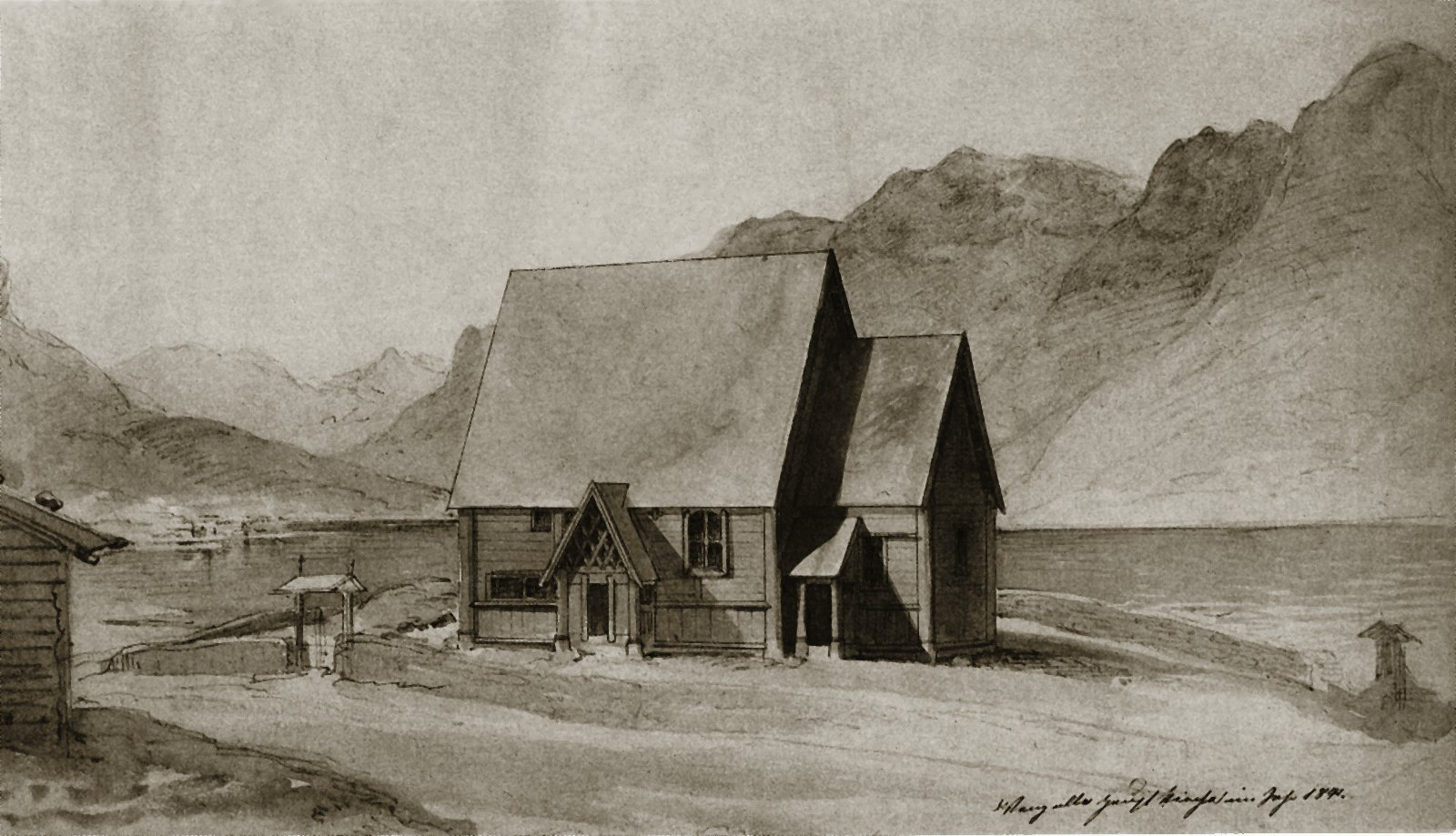
Drawing of the stave church from 1841 by F.W. Schiertz

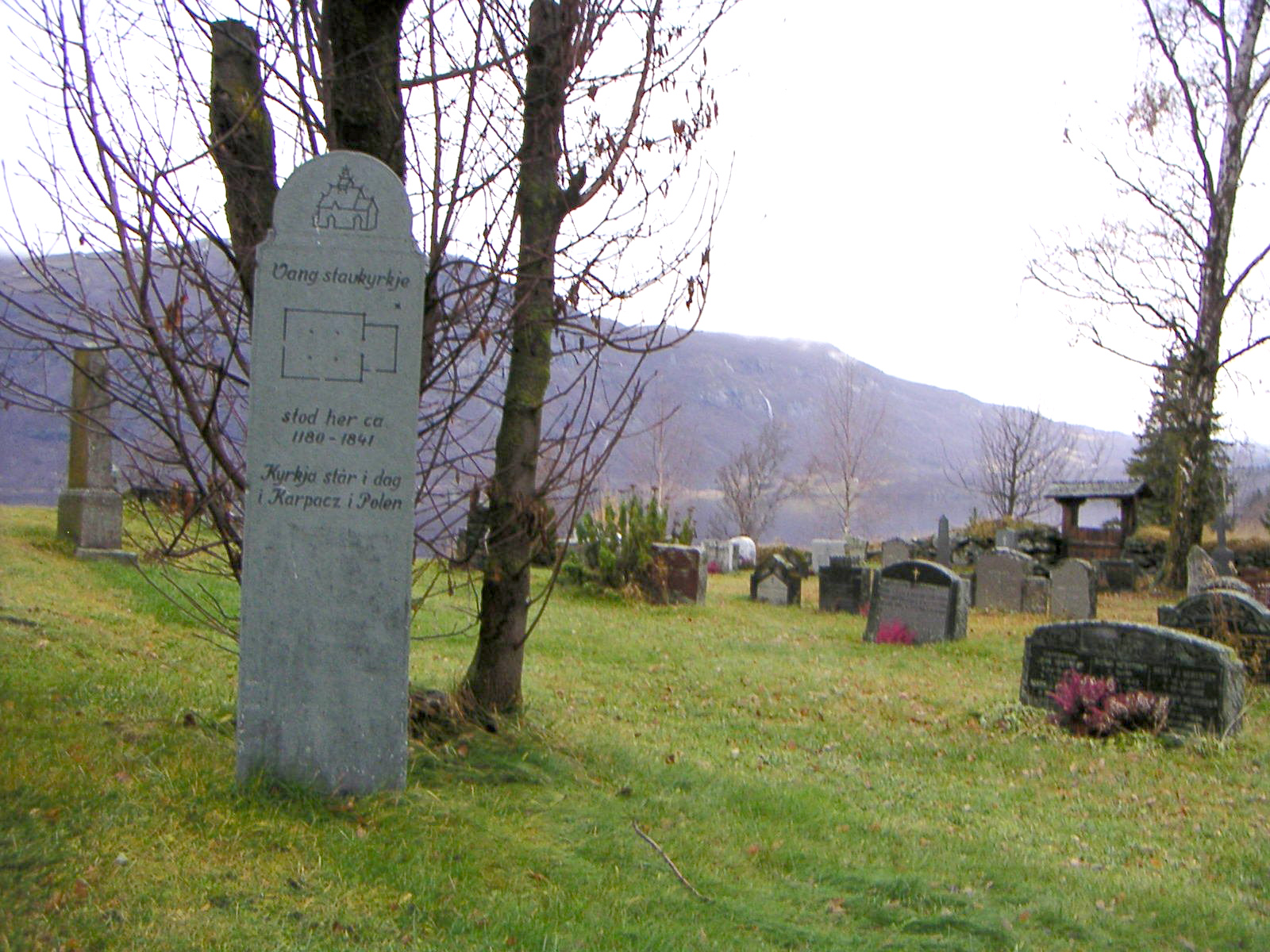
Original location of Vang Stave Church in Norway

While traveling in Norway in 1839, Dahl again visited Vang. He found the stave church still standing, beside a newly built larger log-built church seating 230 parishioners. Demolition of the old one was imminent. Dahl was more than ever convinced that the stave church must be preserved as a cultural monument. He proposed without success to have it re-erected as a Royal Chapel in Christiania, or as a museum church adjacent to the medieval Haakon's Hall in Bergen. Count Herman Wedel Jarlsberg announced his willingness to place it in his park at Bogstad manor near Christiania, but he died before the plan could be carried out.

Dahl saw no other way than to buy the church himself. He asked the vicar of Vang to bid on his behalf at the public auction held in January 1841. Dahl won the bid at 86 speciedaler, 1 ort and 7 skilling, on the condition that the site was cleared by the end of the year. Accused of being a speculant, Dahl defended himself by stating that his only intention was to rescue the church, and that he had no intention of making money from the deal.

The solution came from Crown Prince, later King Frederick William IV of Prussia, whom Dahl knew personally. After the exchange of several letters, he persuaded the prince to take over responsibility for the Vang Stave Church and cover the costs of re-erecting it in Potsdam.

The task of surveying the church, marking the materials, supervising the dismantling and preparing for the transportation was entrusted to the young German architect Franz Wilhelm Schiertz, who had helped Dahl to make the plates for his book on the stave churches, and who was probably also known to the Crown Prince. Schiertz did pioneering work in documentation and planning for an enterprise without precedent. His drawings and inventories are now priceless sources of knowledge about the original appearance of the stave church. All pieces were marked and packed for transportation during the summer. In September they were delivered at the harbour of Lærdalsøyri at the head of the Sognefjord, where they were loaded on board the Haabet, bound for Stettin (Szczecin). Upon arrival in Stettin after two months at sea, the materials were transferred onto a barge for the last leg of the journey to Berlin, where they were stored during the winter in the courtyard of the Altes Museum.

The original plan had been to re-erect the church on the Pfaueninsel (Peacock Island) near Potsdam. But in the meantime, this plan was discarded in favour of a site at the remote village of Karpacz Górny near Karpacz in the Giant Mountains (Karkonosze), in the province of Silesia. The idea probably came from countess Friederike von Reden of Bukowiec, whose memorial stands beside the church. Count Christian Leopold von Schaffgotsch Jelenia Góra|Cieplice, donated the site.

In the spring of 1842 the materials were again taken by river barge up the Oder to the foothills, and from there by wagon to the mountain village of Karpacz. The new site for the church is 885 metres (2,904 ft) above sea level in what is now Karpacz Górny, on the way to Sněžka-Śnieżka.

=== Re-erection ===
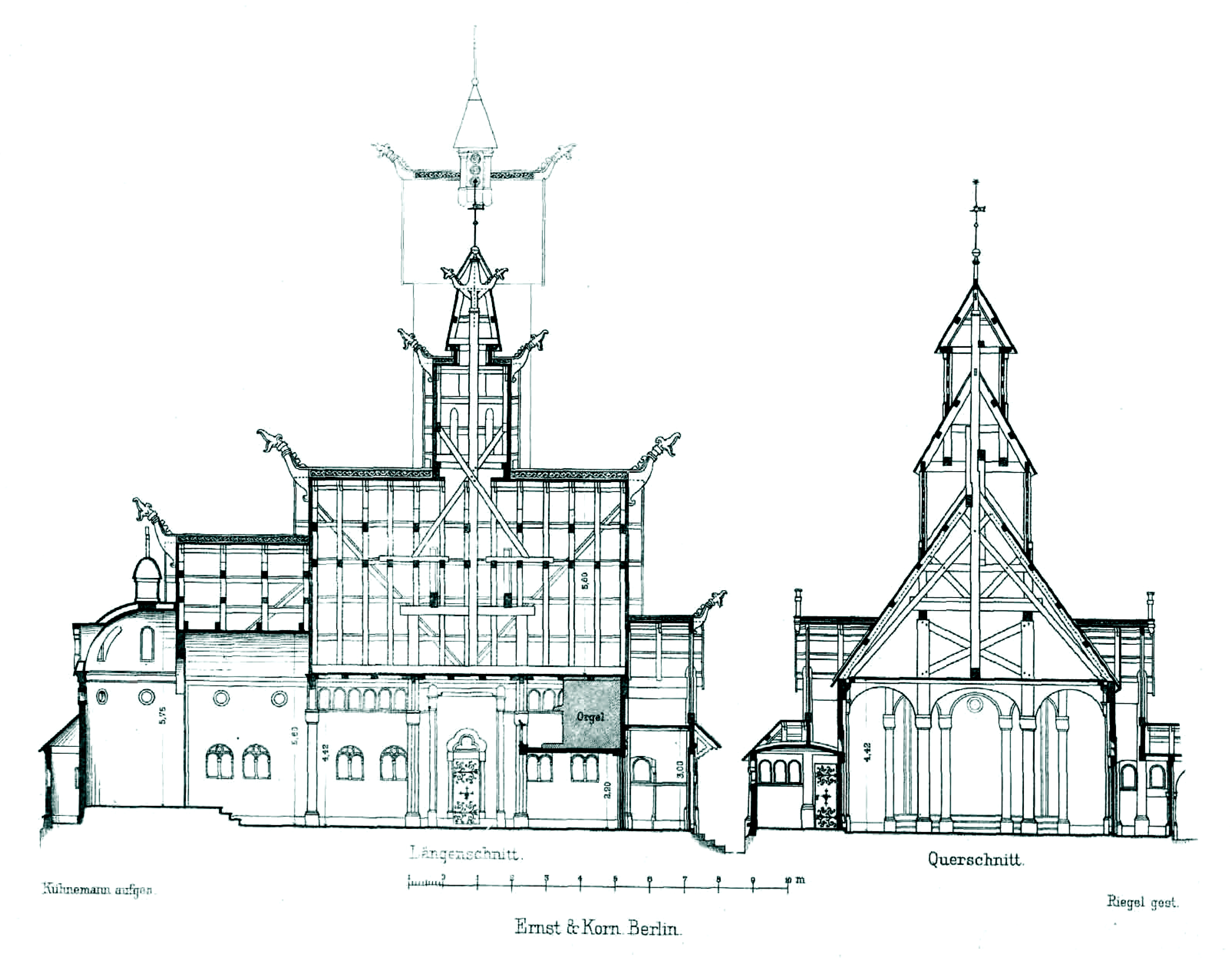
Cross section and longitudinal section of the church.

The foundation stone was laid on 2 August 1842 in the presence of King Friedrich Wilhelm himself. It was a demanding task for carpenters who had never seen the church, nor any stave church, to rebuild it correctly. In spite of excellent drawings, most of the materials were discarded. Only the main construction, consisting of sills, posts and wall plates, were made use of, in addition to the carved doorframes. All of the external gallery was built with new materials, and every wall plank was replaced.

The long lost apse was reconstructed, albeit with a very strange baroque roof. The gallery and the flèche were reconstructed, but several new windows without historical precedent were put in. The doorways were turned inside out, with the carvings facing inward. The decorated ceiling above the choir was not restored, probably because it seemed too Catholic in a Protestant church. All the original roof trusses were renewed.

The work took two years and the total cost amounted to more than 75 000 marks. On the King's birthday, 15 October 1843, the flèche with the date 1200 was raised. On 27 July 1844 Prince Frederick of the Netherlands together with huge crowds witnessed the consecration of "Die Bergkirche unseres Erlösers zu Wang" (The mountain church of Our Savior of Vang). The former owner J. C. Dahl was not present, but he was happy to know that his project had been realised. He was spared the burden of preserving only certain decorated elements, and pleased that "a fair likeness" had been rebuilt.

Now serving a Polish Lutheran community, Wang church has become a major tourist attraction and is probably the world's most visited stave church with about 200,000 visitors each year.

== Original building ==
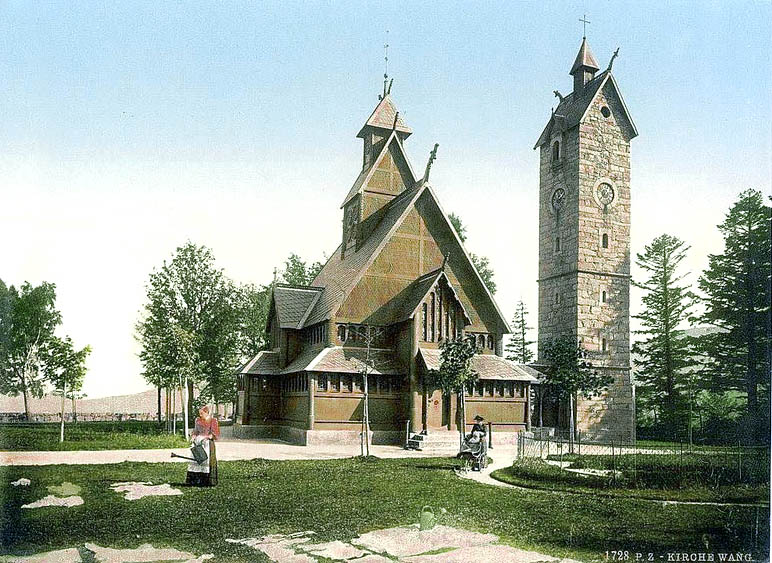
Postcard from 1900

The layout with four internal posts or staves is common to several stave churches in the Valdres region. But in the stave churches of Høre and Lomen they are incorporated into a construction with a raised roof above the central part of the nave, whereas the churches of Vang and Øye have ordinary saddle roofs, with no structural connection between the roof and the interior posts.

According to tradition, the church had been relocated once before at an earlier date, confirming the opinion of many scholars that it was much altered before leaving Vang. The Norwegian architect Arne Berg has after thorough examination of the rebuilt church concluded that the remaining original materials belonged to a stave church of the Sogn type with a raised roof above the central part of the nave. Dating evidence is, however, scant. He estimates it to have been built around 1200 – confirming the rather dubious date inscribed in 1843. It may have been rebuilt already in the medieval period, but perhaps as late as 1600.

== Runic inscription N 83 ==
There is a runic inscription listed in Rundata as N 83 located on the doorway of the church, of which the expert Magnus Olsen has proposed the translation: " Eindridi the dexterous carved (the doorway), the son of Olav of Lo" (Old Norse: Eindriði skar, mjáfingr, sonr Ólafs á Ló). If this is the correct interpretation, the inscription identifies the artist. His name was Eindridi, his nickname was "dexterous" or "handy", and his father was Olav of Lo. In 1937, the inscription was reported as badly damaged and hardly readable. The interpretations of the inscriptions are based on copies made before the church was moved.

== Gallery ==
Old and modern photos
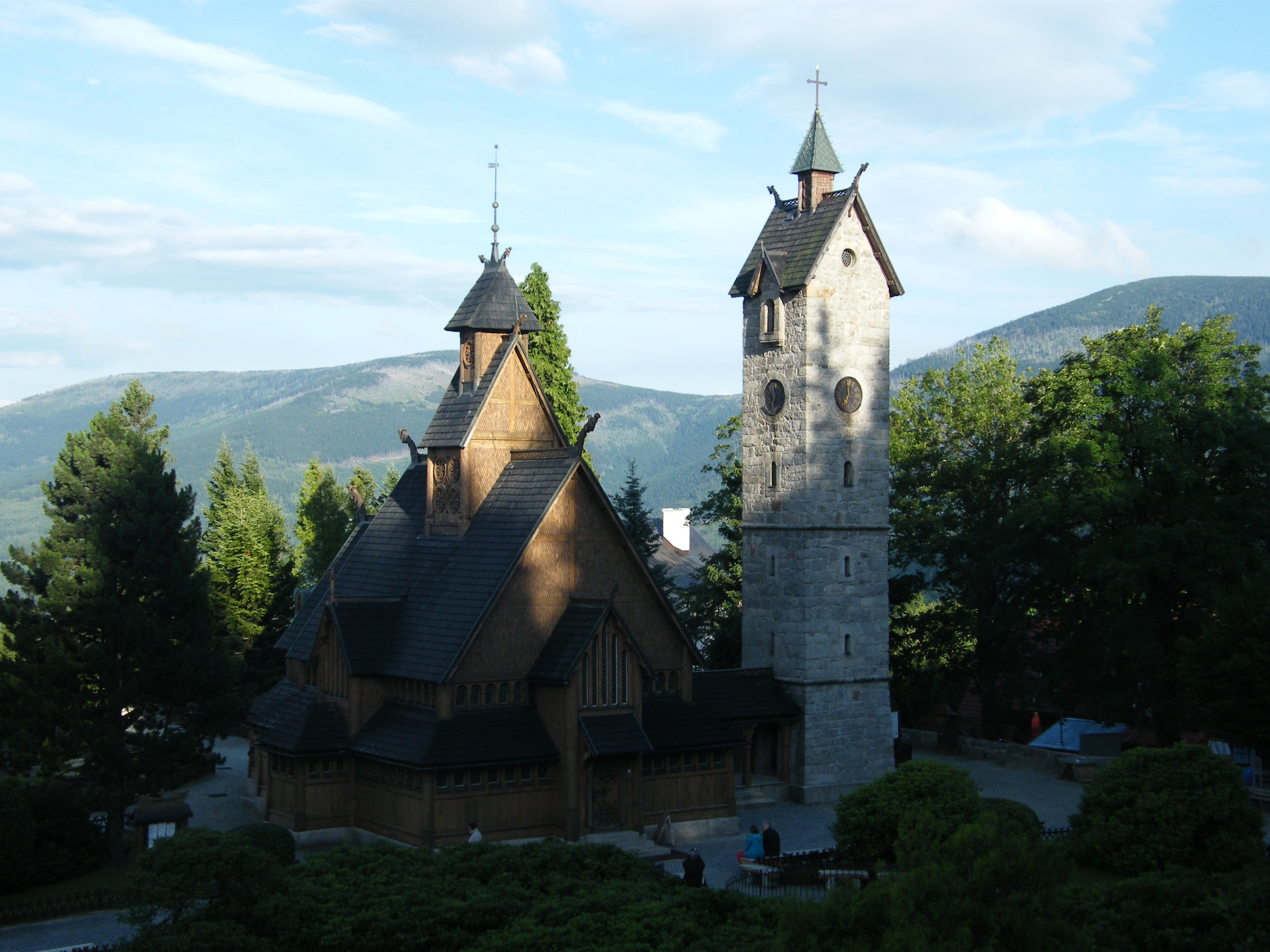

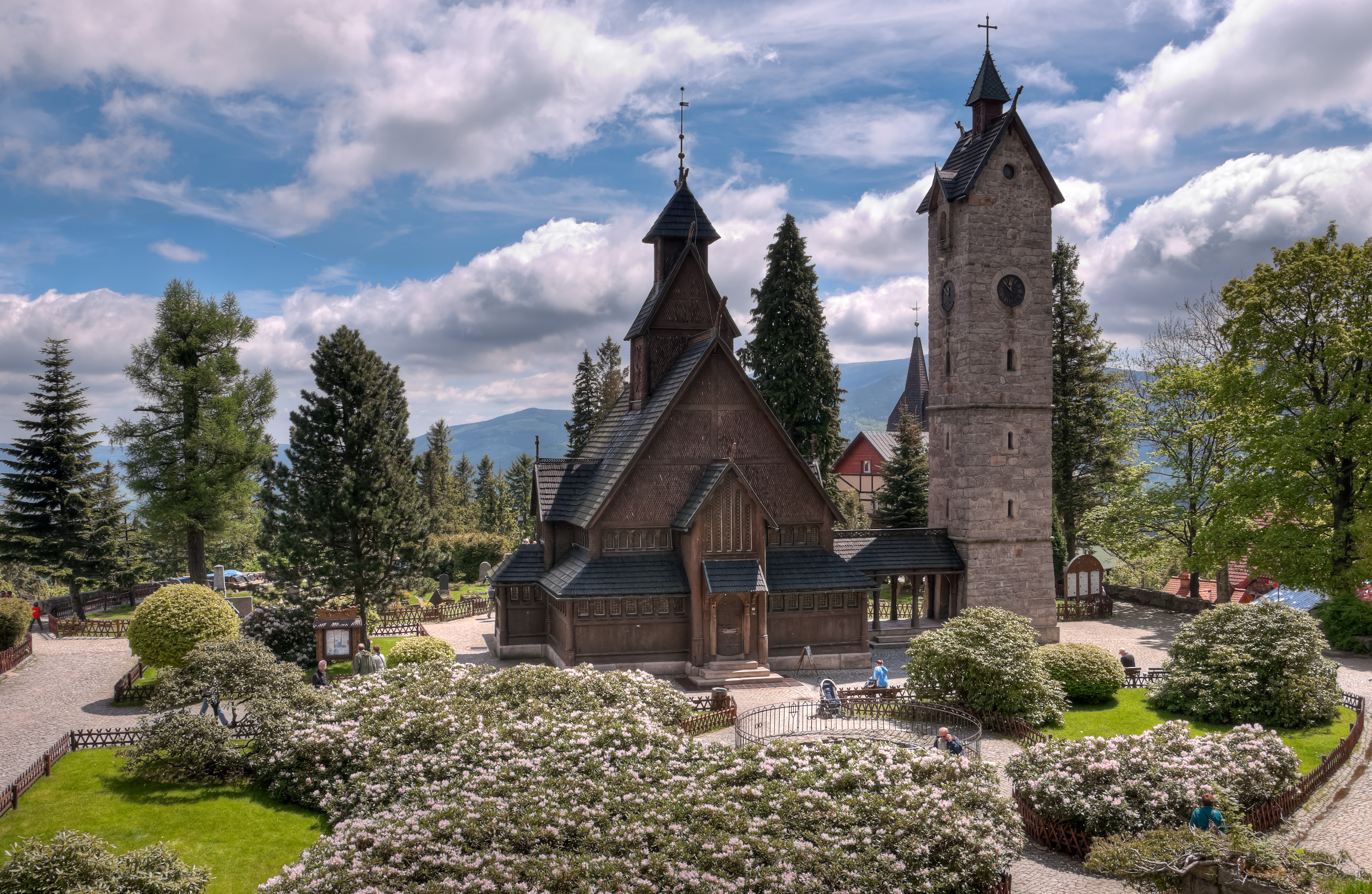

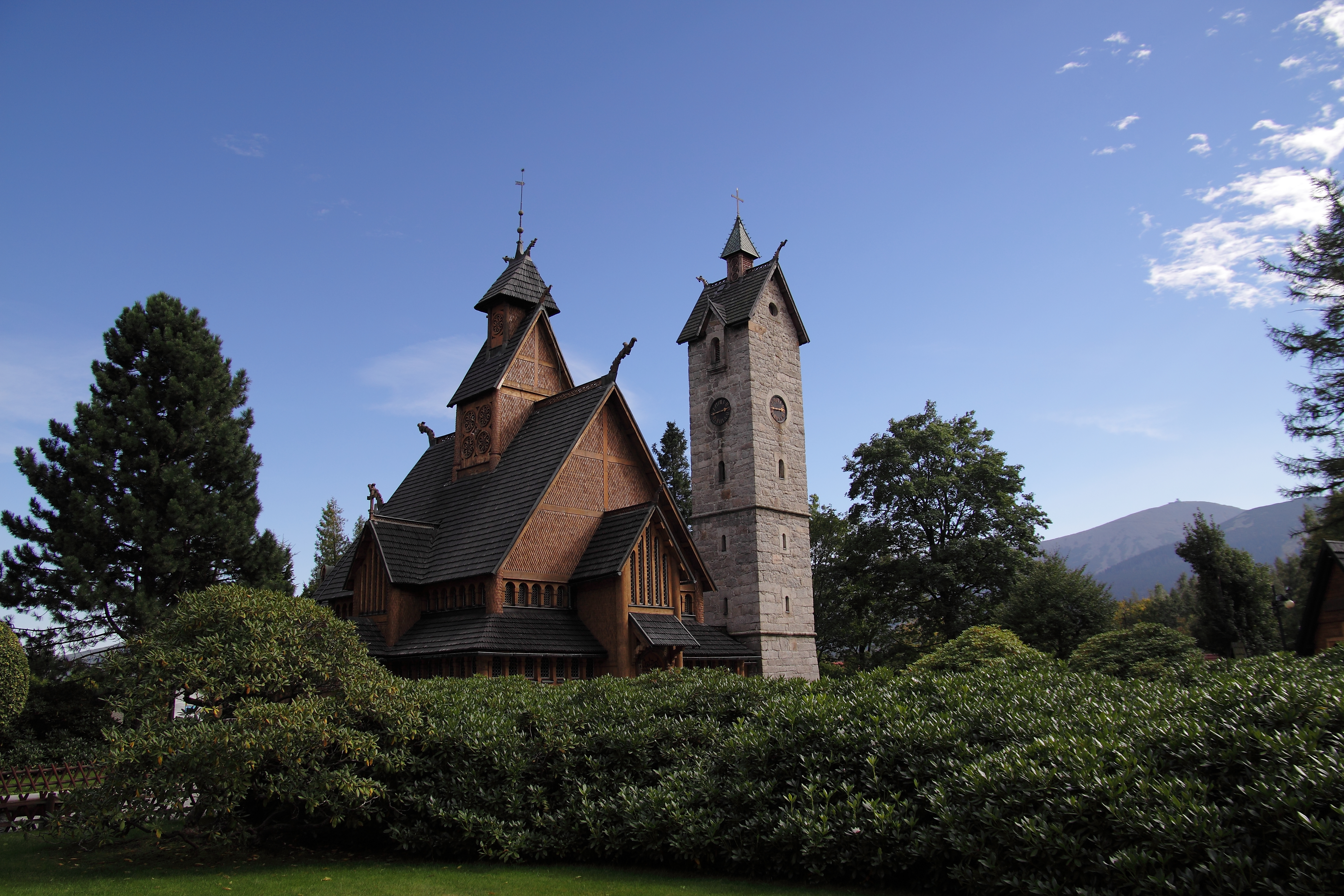
Illustrations and decorations
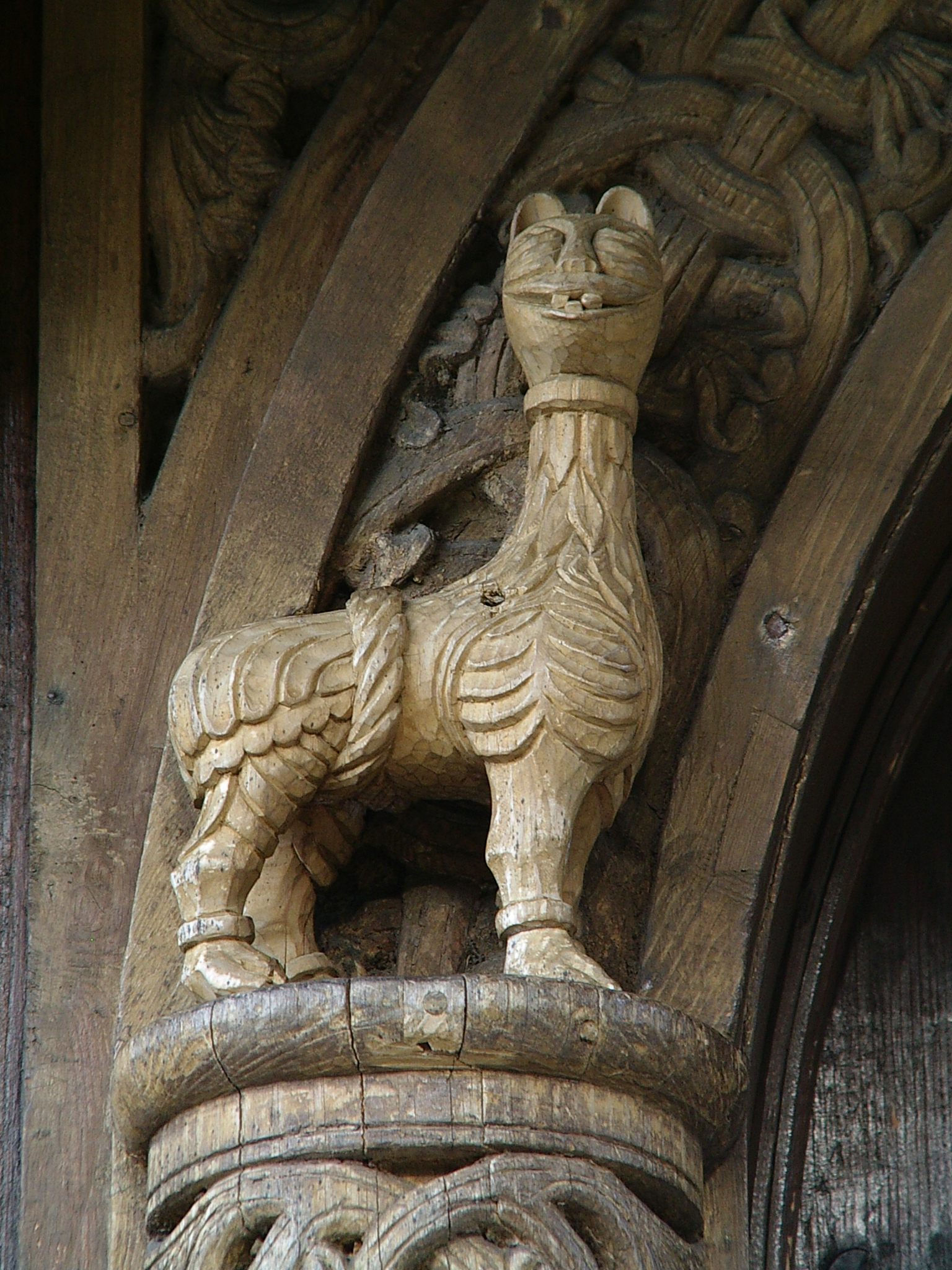
Lion on the church' doors

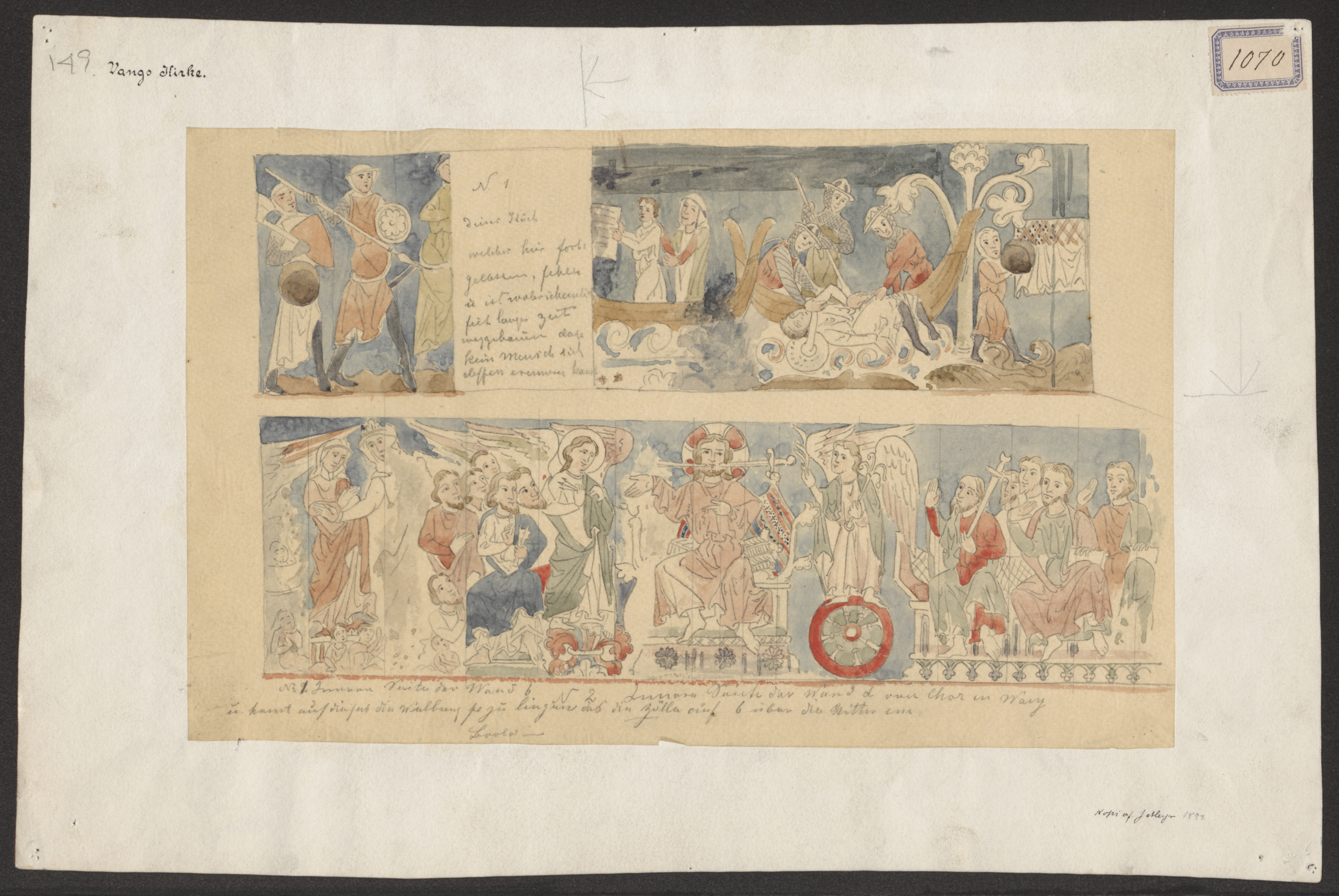
Painted decorations on the wall: Throne Christ with sword pierced through cheeks, St.Hallvard legend

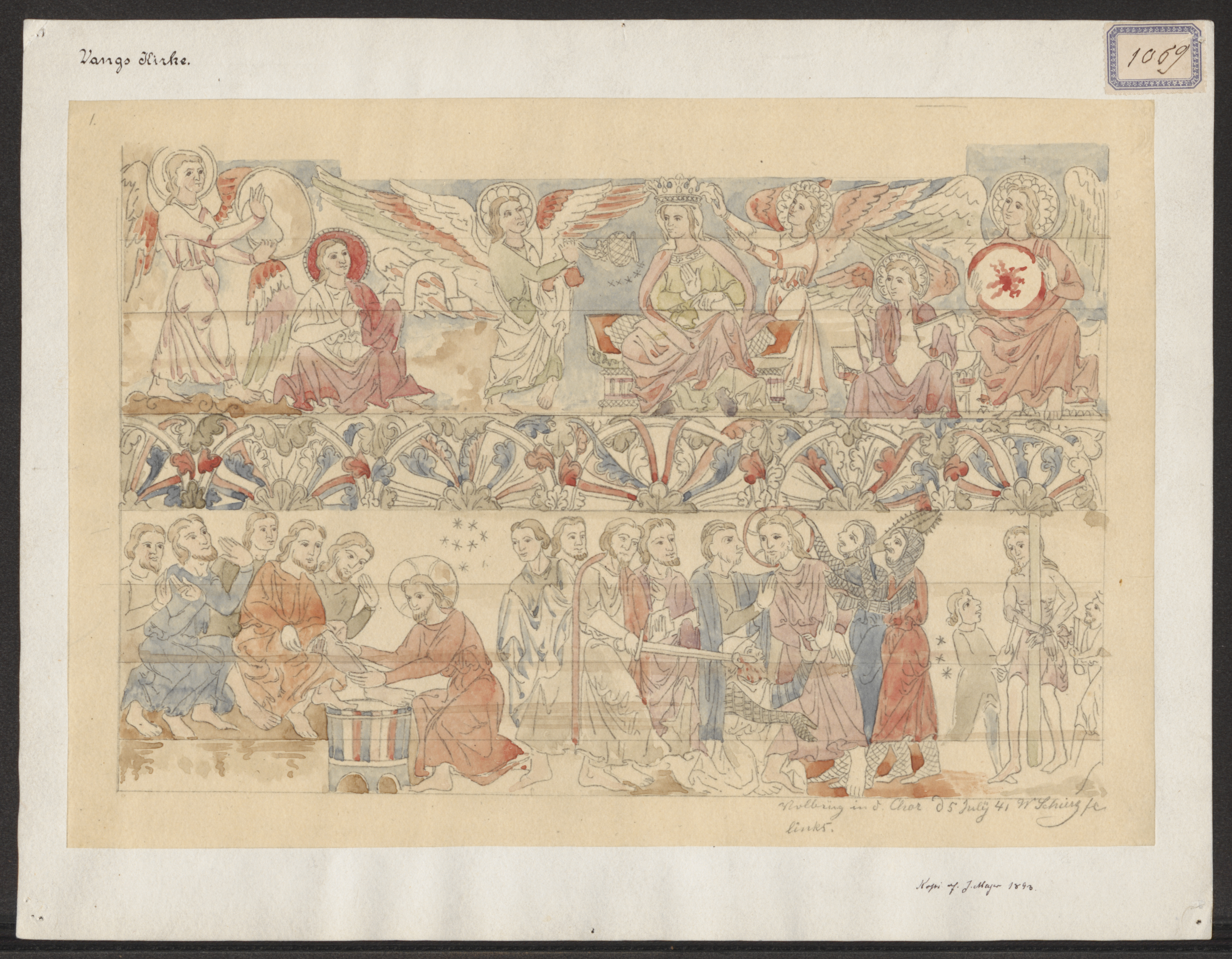
Painted decorations in the choir: Mary's coronation, foot washing and Christ in the courtyard of Herod

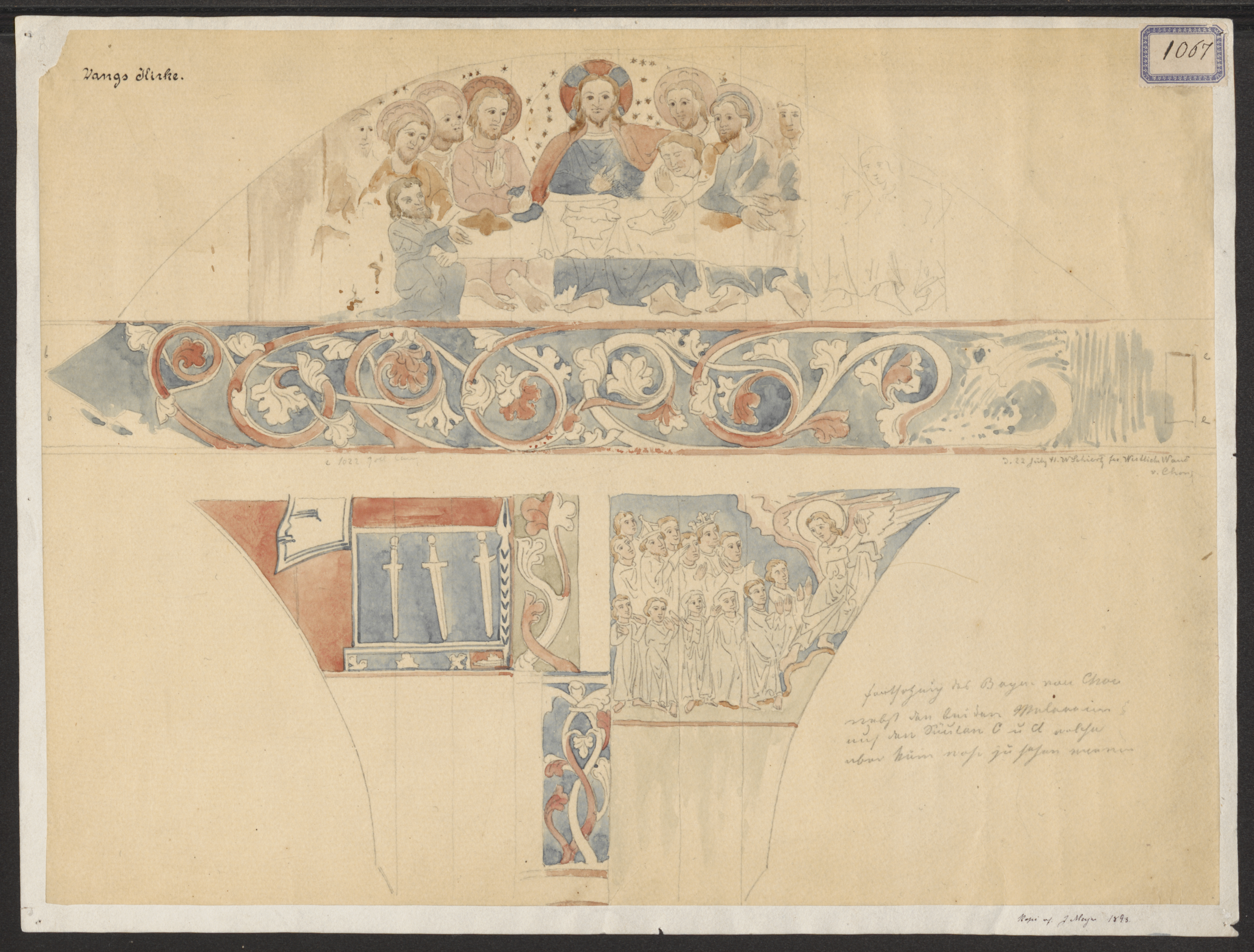
Painted decorations in the choir, Holy Communion

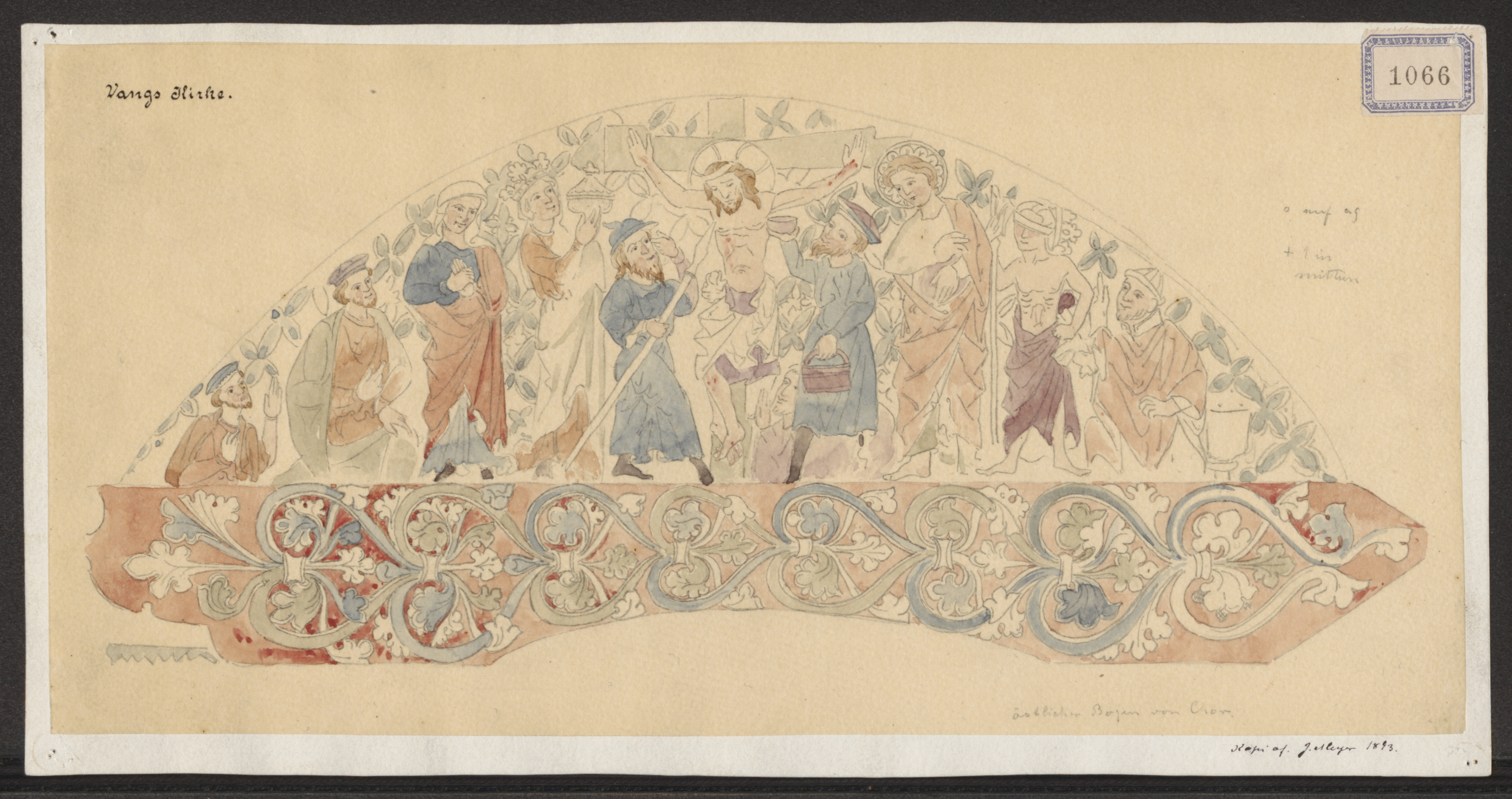
Painted decorations in the choir arch

== See also ==
- The Vang stone
- Øye Stave Church
