= St. Luke's Church, Brzeg =

Coordinates: 50°51′22″N 17°28′47″E

St. Luke's Church (Brzeg)
- Kościół Ewangelicko-Augsburski św. Łukasza w Brzegu
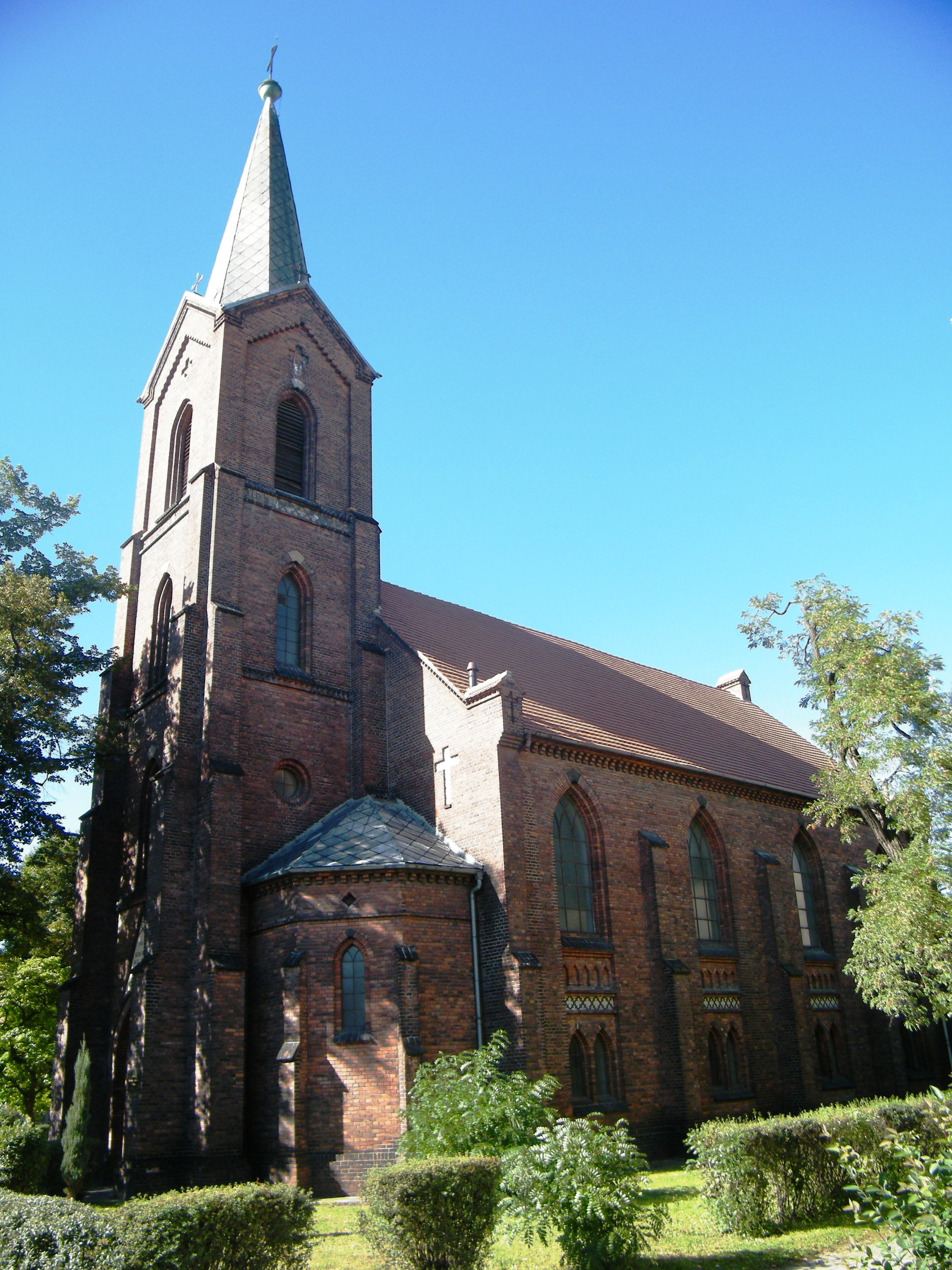
- St. Luke's Church
- St. Luke's Church (Brzeg)
- Location: Brzeg
- Country: Poland
- Denomination: Evangelical Church of the Augsburg Confession

Architecture
- Style: Neoclassical
- Completed: 1897

Specifications
- Materials: Brick

Administration
- Parish: Parafia Ewangelicko-Augsburska w Brzegu

Clergy
- Dean: Sławomir Fonfara

St. Luke's Church - a parish church belonging to the Lutheran Diocese of Katowice. The church is located in Brzeg, Opole Voivodeship in Poland.

== History ==
Formerly, the site was that of an Old Lutheran place of worship. In 1897, the beginning of the construction of the church began. The construction work only took six months. The church was ceremonially blessed on October 10, 1897, and took the summons of St. Luke the Evangelist. During World War I, 29 Old Lutherans died - a memorial plaque has been set in remembrance of them, on the wall of the church. After 1945, Brzeg became part of the Western and Recovered Territories, becoming again part of Poland. Up until 1952, the parish did not have permanent parish priest. Every two weeks, Priest Karol Jadwiszczok celebrated the liturgy and services in the Holy Trinity Church (Kościół Świętej Trójcy in Polish). When authorities ordered the church's deconstruction, the Lutherans started celebrating their services at the then vandalised Old Lutheran St. Luke's Church. The first permanent parish priest was Priest Stanisław Żwak, which already as a student helped out Priest Karol Jadwiszczok. After ordination, he became the leader of the denomination's parish in Brzeg and Kłodzko. He lived in Lewin Brzeski. Since 1999, the parish has been served by Priest Marian Niemiec from Opole. As of 2014, the parish has its own parish priest.
