= Bohusz =

Bohusz is a surname. Notable people with the surname include:

- Adolf Szyszko-Bohusz (1883–1948), Polish architect
- Ignacy Bohusz (1720–1778), Polish-Lithuanian noble
- Zygmunt Bohusz-Szyszko (1893–1982), Polish general

== See also ==
- Bogusz
- Bogusze (disambiguation)
