= Bogush =

Bogush is a russianized form of the surnames Bohush, Bogusz. It is derived from a diminutive form of given names starting with Bog-: Bogusław, Bogdan, Boguchwał. Notable people with the surname include:

- Andrey Bogush, Russian-born artist
- Elizabeth Bogush (born 1977), American actress
- Pavel Bogush (born 1996), Belarusian professional footballer
- Vadim Bogush (born 1975), Belarusian academic and politician
