= Holy Cross Church, Ligota Górna =

Coordinates: 50.5830°N 18.1535°E

Holy Cross Church
- Kościół Świętego Krzyża
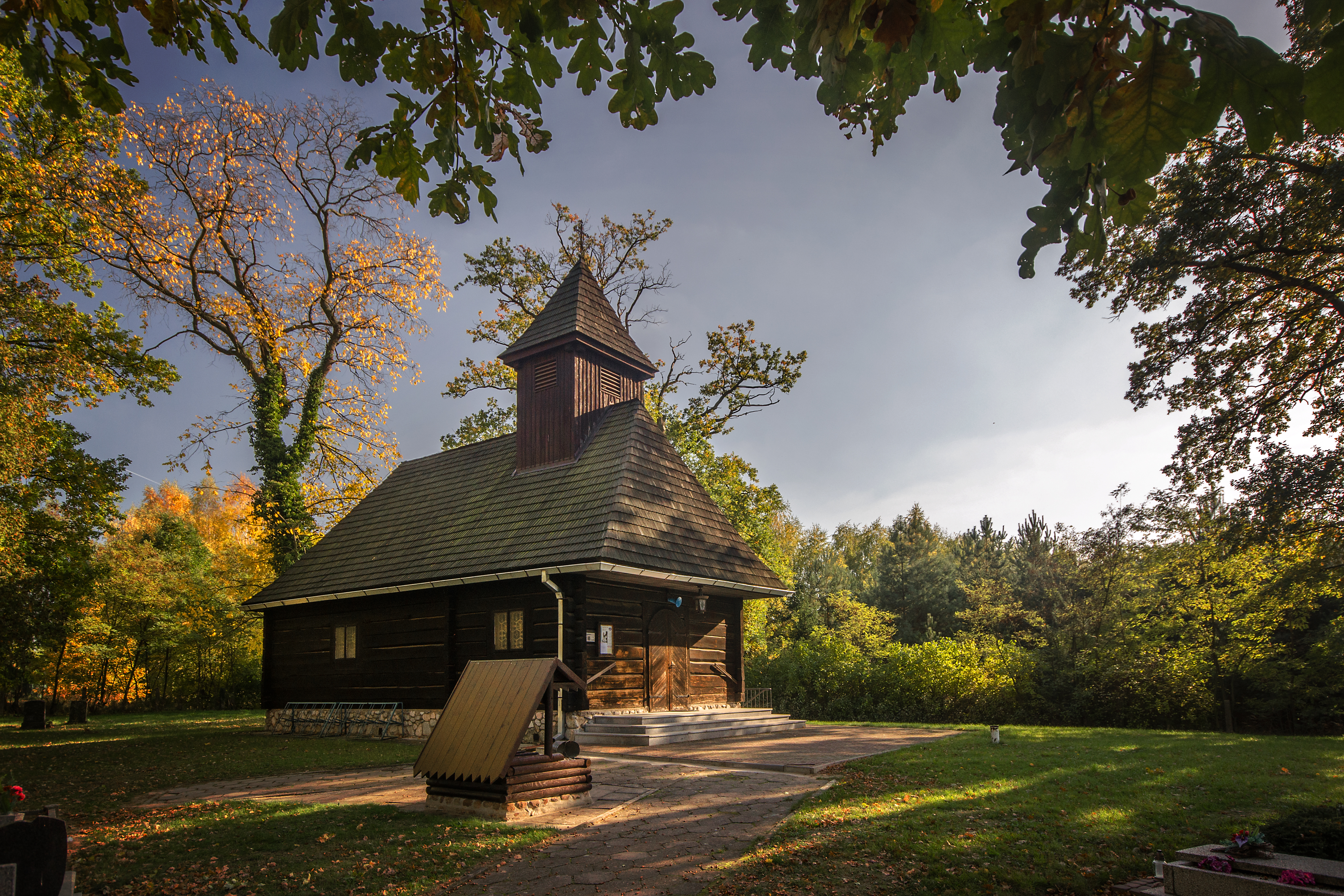
- Holy Cross Church
- Holy Cross Church
- Location: Ligota Górna
- Country: Poland
- Denomination: Roman Catholic, Evangelical-Augsburg

History
- Founder: Jan Kabat

Architecture
- Completed: 1787

Specifications
- Materials: Wood

Administration
- Parish: Parafia Matki Bożej Wspomożenia Wiernych w Kluczborku oraz Parafia Ewangelicko-Augsburska w Kluczborku

Holy Cross Church in Ligota Górna, Poland, is a wooden church built in 1787. The church, a chapel of ease serves the Roman Catholic and the Evangelical-Augsburg Church.
