= Juliusz Bursche =

Polish bishop

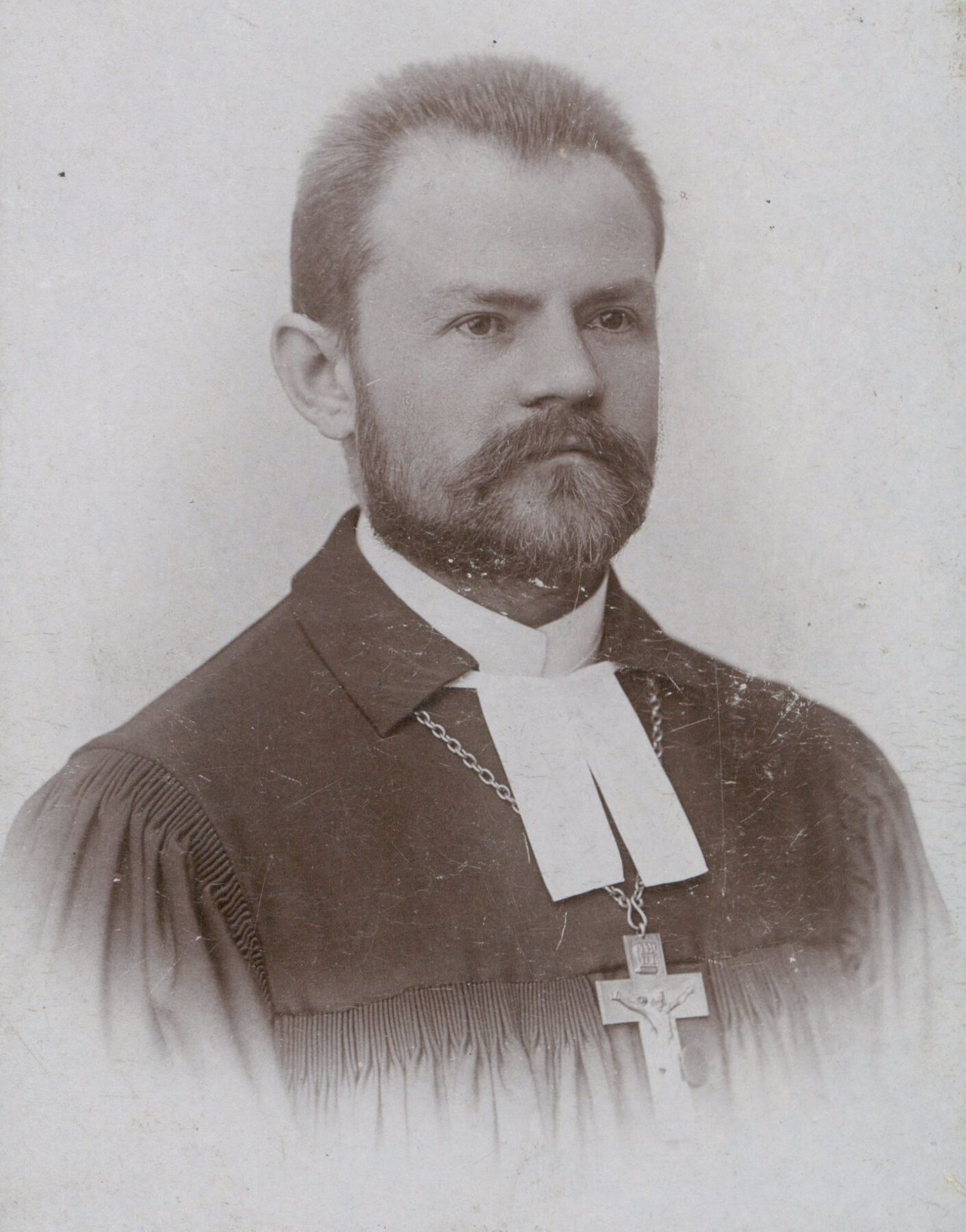
Bursche in 1905

Juliusz Bursche (19 September 1862 in Kalisz – 20 February 1942?) was a bishop of the Evangelical-Augsburg Church in Poland. A vocal opponent of Nazi Germany, after the German invasion of Poland in 1939, he was arrested by the Germans, tortured, and sent to Sachsenhausen concentration camp where he died.

== Youth ==
Bursche was born as the first child to Ernst Wilhelm Bursche, vicar of the Lutheran church at Kalisz and his wife Mathilda, born Müller. The family moved to Zgierz, near Łódź, where his father became a Protestant pastor. Bursche studied Lutheran divinity at the University of Tartu and became a member of the "Konwent Polonia", a Polish student fraternity, established in 1828. There, he was influenced by the ideas of Leopold Otto, a Lutheran pastor from Warsaw who wanted to overcome the stereotype of Poles being Catholics and Germans being Lutherans.

== Lutheran Pastor ==
Bursche started working as a vicar in Warsaw in 1884 and married Amalie Helena Krusche in 1885. After a short time as a pastor at Żyrardów, he returned to the Warsaw Lutheran congregation in 1888. In 1904, he was elected as General-Superintendent of the Protestant Church in Congress Poland. In 1905, he instituted the use of the Polish language in Lutheran church services, which had previously been only ministered in German.

After the outbreak of the First World War in 1914, the Russian administration of Congress Poland began to deport members of the Lutheran church, considering them as Germans. Bursche was sent to Moscow in 1915, where he remained until the Russian February Revolution in 1917. He returned to German–occupied Warsaw in February 1918 and became a member of the Regency Council of the Kingdom of Poland. After the foundation of the Second Polish Republic, he was a member of the Polish delegation at the Paris Peace Conference and attempted to incorporate the predominantly Lutheran area of Masuria into the Polish state. In accordance with the Treaty of Versailles, the East Prussian plebiscite took place on 20 July 1920, and Bursche was the chairman of the Masurian Plebiscite Committee, organising the unsuccessful Polish publicity campaign in East Prussia. From 1922 to 1939, he issued the Polish newspaper in Masuria Gazeta Mazurska.

In 1936 the Polish government acknowledged the Evangelical-Augsburg (i.e. Lutheran) Church in Poland and Bursche became Poland's first Lutheran bishop. Because of his staunchly pro-Polish policy, a part of the German minority in Poland, most of them Lutherans, opposed his guidance and founded an independent Lutheran church in Poland in the spring of 1939.

== World War II ==
After the German Invasion of Poland in September 1939, Bursche was captured by the Sicherheitsdienst on 3 October 1939 and imprisoned in Radom, and after 13 October 1939 at the central Gestapo prison in Berlin. In January 1940, he was sent to Sachsenhausen concentration camp. At the end of February 1942, his family was informed that Bursche had died on 20 February 1942 in Berlin–Moabit Prison. The exact circumstances of his death and even the real date and place are unknown.

== Family ==
Bursche's son Stefan was killed by the Gestapo in 1940, his daughter Helena, director of the Lutheran Anna – Wasa Lyceum in Warsaw, died in 1975, his daughter Aniela, journalist at the Lutheran newspaper Zwiestun, died in 1980 in Warsaw.

Bursche's brothers:

- Edmund Bursche, Lutheran Pastor (17 July 1881 – 26 July 1940 Mauthausen concentration camp)
- Alfred Bursche, Lawyer (16 November 1883 – 15 January 1942, Mauthausen concentration camp)
- Teodor Bursche, Architect (31 May 1893 – 15 March 1965)

== Literature ==
- Paweł Dubiel, Józef Kozak: Polacy w II wojnie światowej: kim byli, co robili, Oficyna Wydawnicza RYTM, Warsaw, 2003
- Eugeniusz Szulc, Cmentarz Ewangelicko-Augsburski w Warszawie, Warsaw 1989.
