= Evangelical-Augsburg Church, Lublin =

Church building in Lublin, Poland

Coordinates: 51°14′55″N 22°33′18″E

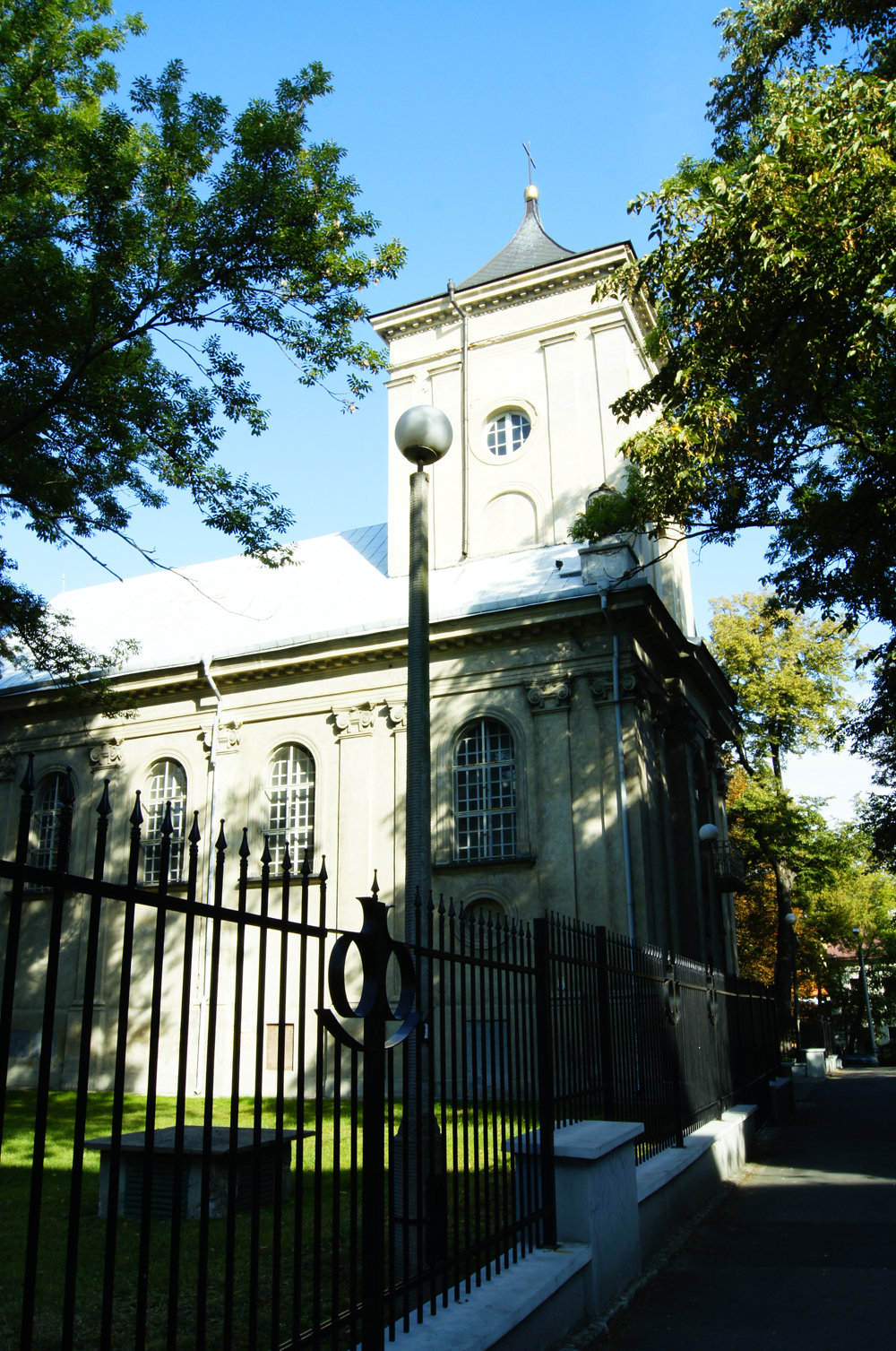
Holy Trinity Church, Lublin

The Evangelical-Augsburg Holy Trinity Church in Lublin – is the fourth largest community of the Evangelical-Augsburg Church in Poland within the Warsaw Diocese.
