= Bogusz coat of arms =

Polish coat of arms

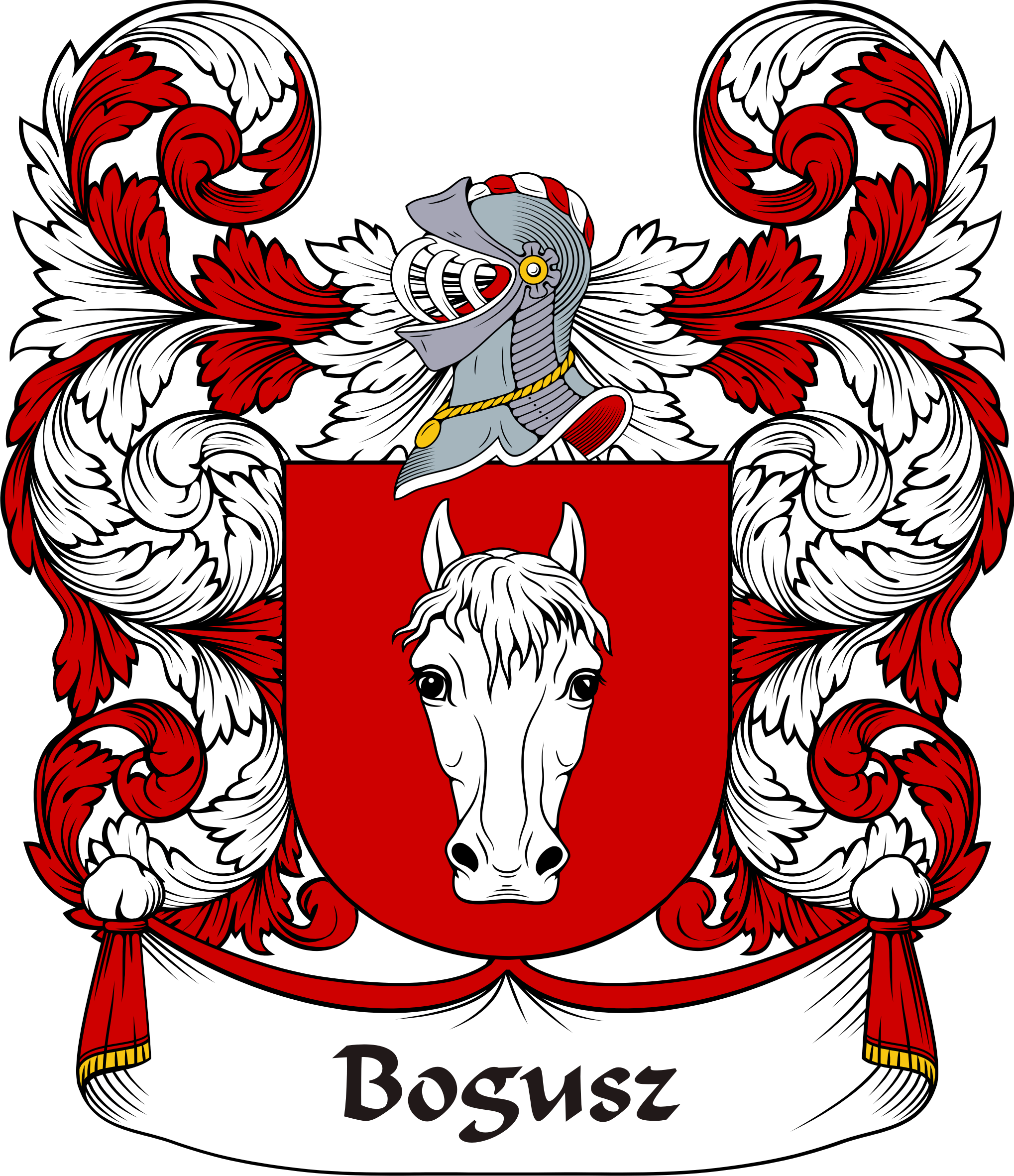
Bogusz Coat of Arms

Bogusz is a Polish surname that emerged in the thirteenth century.

The Bogusz coat of arms is composed of red, which symbolizes courage, with a horse head of pages, which is an emblem of nobility, courage and loyalty. The red color of the shell indicates the virtues and qualities of its bearer, refers to minerals, to plants, the chronology and the planetary system, the basic dictates of the Code of the former Cavalry.

== Notable bearers ==
- Józef Bogusz - member of the Sejm
- Ryszard Bogusz – bishop
