= Bohush (surname) =

Bohush is a Belarusian and Ukrainian surname similar in origin to the Polish surname Bogusz. Russianized variant: Bogush. Notable people with the surname include:

- Ima Bohush, Belarusian tennis player
- Stanislav Bohush, Ukrainian football goalkeeper
