= Bogusz =

Bogusz (Polish pronunciation: [ˈbɔɡuʂ]) is a Polish surname derived from a diminutive form of given names starting with Bog-: Bogusław, Bogdan, Boguchwał. It is related to the place name Bogusze and the surnames Bogush, Bohusz (featuring a 'g' → 'h' mutation which is more frequent south and east of Poland). Notable people with the surname:

- Daniel Bogusz (born 1974), Polish footballer
- Ryszard Bogusz (born 1951), Polish theologian
- Mateusz Bogusz (born 2001), Polish footballer
- Matthew Bogusz (born 1986), mayor of Des Plaines, Illinois

== See also ==
- Bogusz coat of arms
- Bogusz Bilewski
