= Ligota Górna, Kluczbork County =

Ligota Górna
- Village
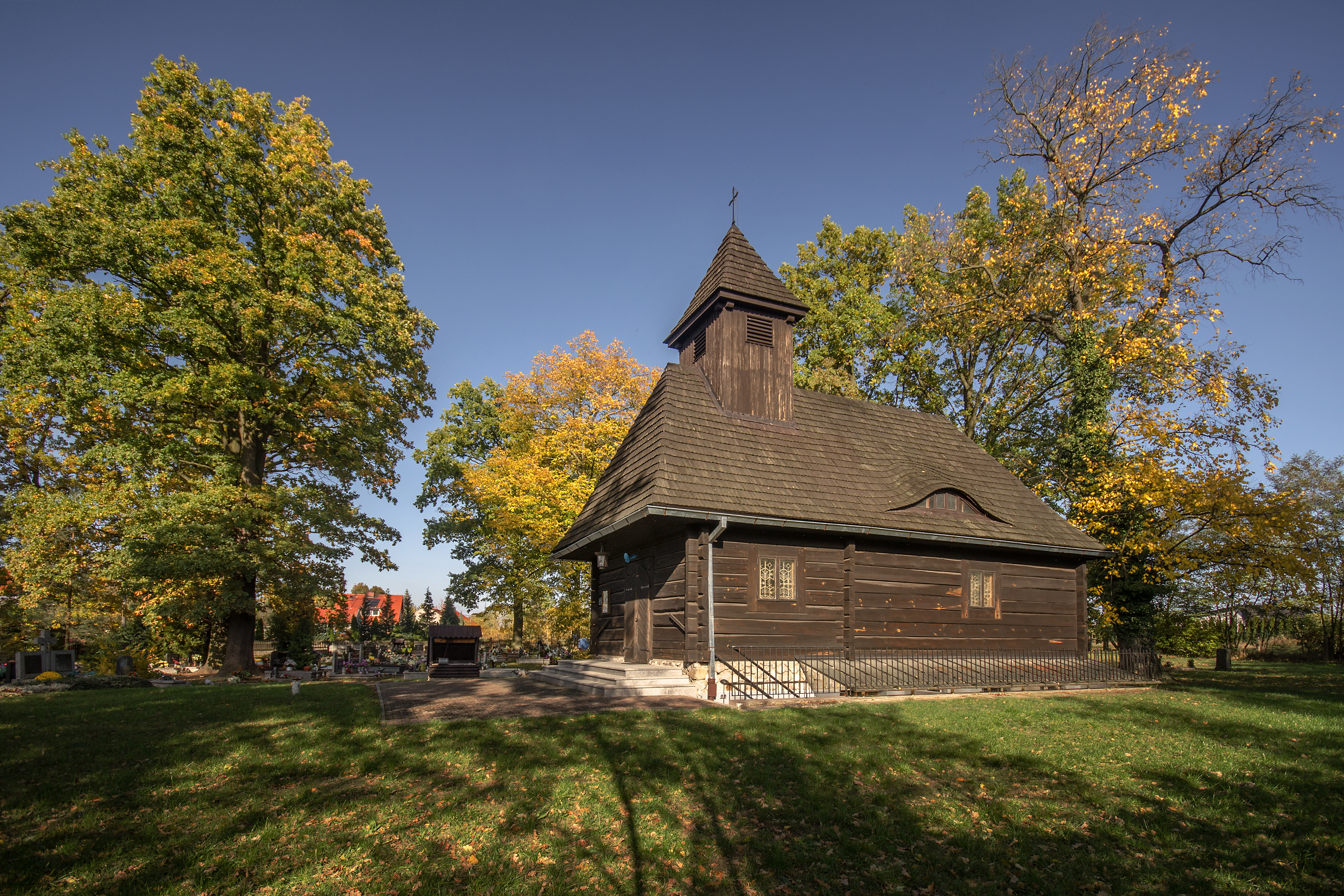
- Holy Cross Church

- Location within Poland
- Coordinates: 50°58′14″N 18°15′19″E
- Country: Poland
- Voivodeship: Opole
- County: Kluczbork
- Gmina: Kluczbork
- Time zone: UTC+1 (CET)
  - Summer (DST): UTC+2 (CEST)
- Vehicle registration: OKL

Ligota Górna [liˈɡɔta ˈɡurna] is a village in the administrative district of Gmina Kluczbork, within Kluczbork County, Opole Voivodeship, in southern Poland.

== See also ==
- Holy Cross Church, Ligota Górna
