= Lutheran Diocese of Wrocław =

Lutheran diocese in Poland

Diocese of Wrocław Diecezja wrocławska
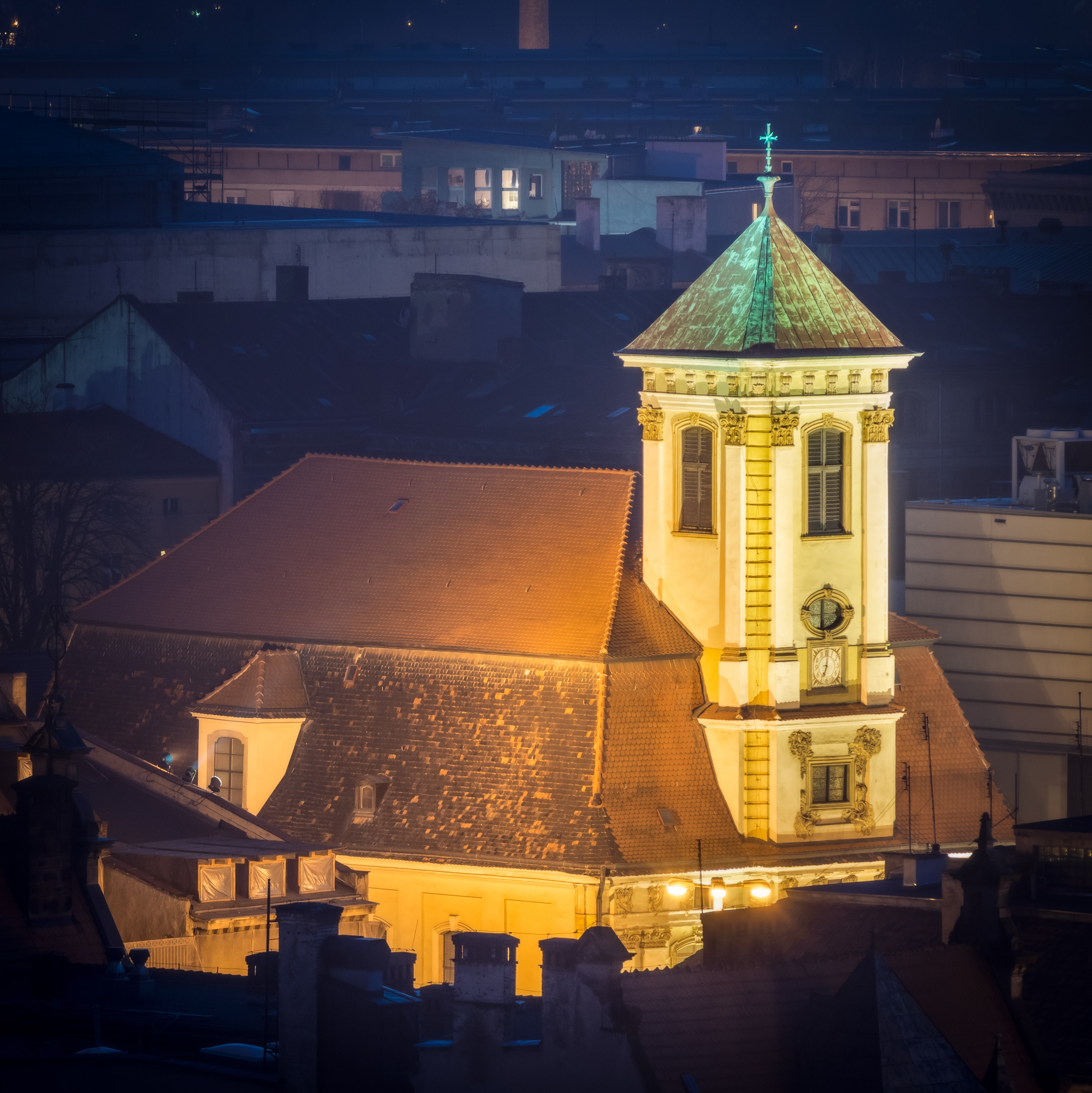
- Courtly church in Wrocław

Location
- Country: Poland
- Headquarters: Wrocław

Statistics
- Parishes: 16
- Denomination: Evangelical Church of the Augsburg Confession in Poland

Current leadership
- Bishop: Waldemar Pytel

The Lutheran Diocese of Wrocław is one of the six dioceses of the Evangelical Church of the Augsburg Confession in Poland.

== Location ==
The Lutheran Diocese of Wrocław is located in western Poland. It ranges from Kłodzko in the south to the Baltic Sea coast in the north. The territory of the Lutheran Diocese of Wrocław comprises Lower Silesia, Lubusz, and the western part of West Pomerania.

== Organizational structure ==
Today, the Lutheran Diocese of Wrocław has 16 parishes. Current bishop is Ryszard Bogusz since 1994.

== List of bishops ==
- Waldemar Preiss : 1947~1952
- Gustaw Gerstenstein : 1952~1958
- Waldemar Lucer : 1958~1979
- Józef Prośpiech : 1980~1994
- Ryszard Bogusz : 1994~
