= Ignacy Bohusz =

Ignacy Bohusz (1720–1778) was a noble in the Polish–Lithuanian Commonwealth. Member of Bar Confederation; Deputy Voivode of Vilnius, starost dorsuński, member of the Lithuanian Tribunal, writer, publicist.

Ally of Karol Stanisław "Panie Kochanku" Radziwiłł, opponent of Familia of Czartoryscy. One of the leaders of the Bar Confederation, supporter of reforming the Commonwealth. In 1778 he returned to the Commonwealth, reached an agreement with the king and was elected deputy to the Sejm.
