= Lutheran Diocese of Masuria =

Diocese of Masuria Diecezja Mazurska
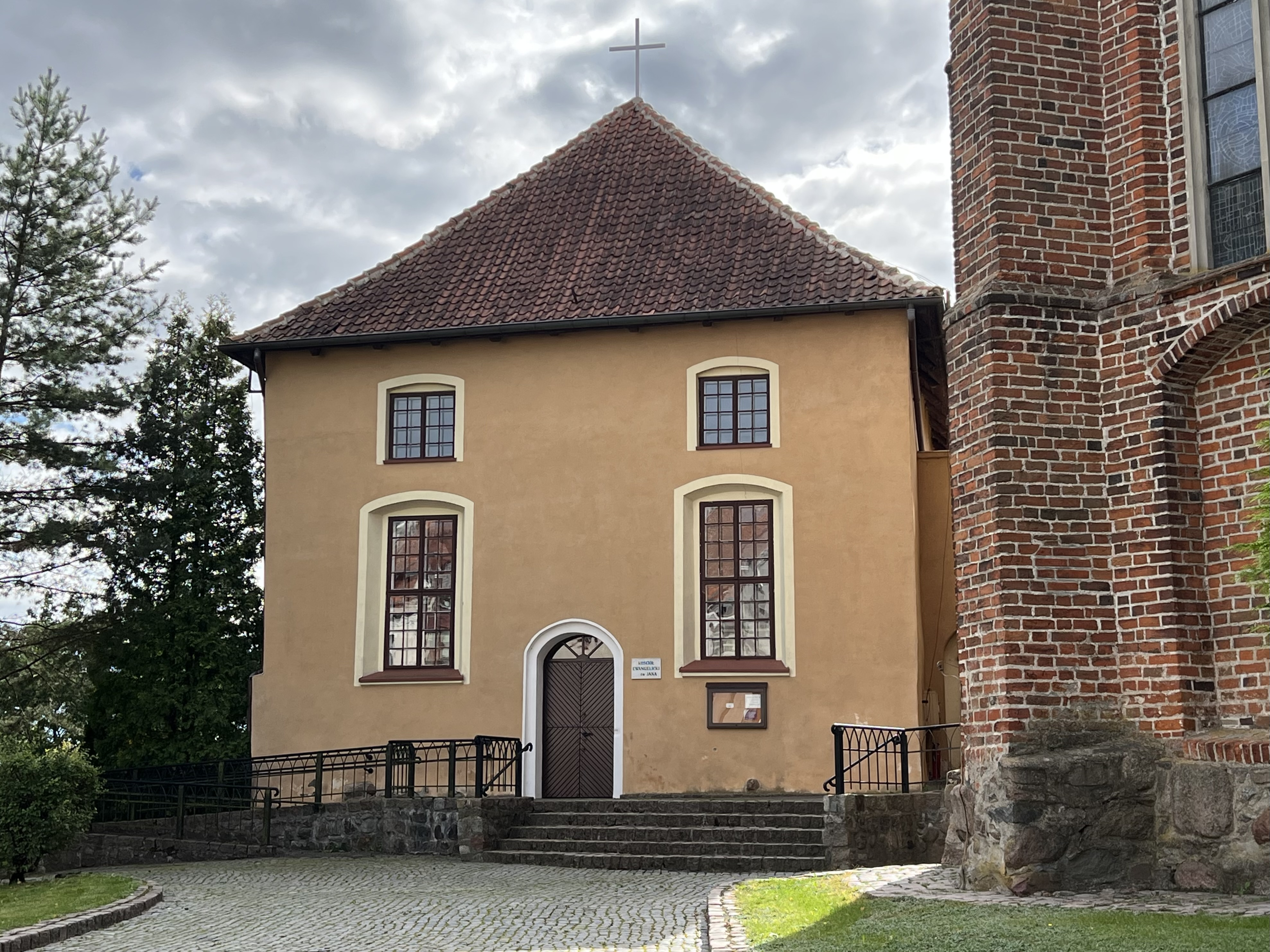
- Church in Kętrzyn

Location
- Country: Poland
- Headquarters: Kętrzyn

Statistics
- Parishes: 15
- Denomination: Evangelical Church of the Augsburg Confession in Poland

Current leadership
- Bishop: Paweł Hause

The Diocese of Masuria is one of the six dioceses constituting the Evangelical Church of the Augsburg Confession in Poland. The diocesan headquarters are located in Kętrzyn.

== Location ==
The Diocese of Masuria is located in northeastern Poland. Its territory extends in the north to the border with Kaliningrad and in the east to the border with Belarus. It includes Warmian-Masurian and Podlachian Voivodeships.

== List of bishops ==
- Edmund Fiszke : 1946~1958
- Alfred Jagucki : 1959~1963
  - Vacant (1963~1966)
- Paweł Kubiczek : 1966~1991
- Rudolf Bażanowski : 1992~2018
- Paweł Hause : 2018~
