= Lutheran Diocese of Pomerania-Greater Poland =

Polish church

Diocese of Pomerania-Greater Poland
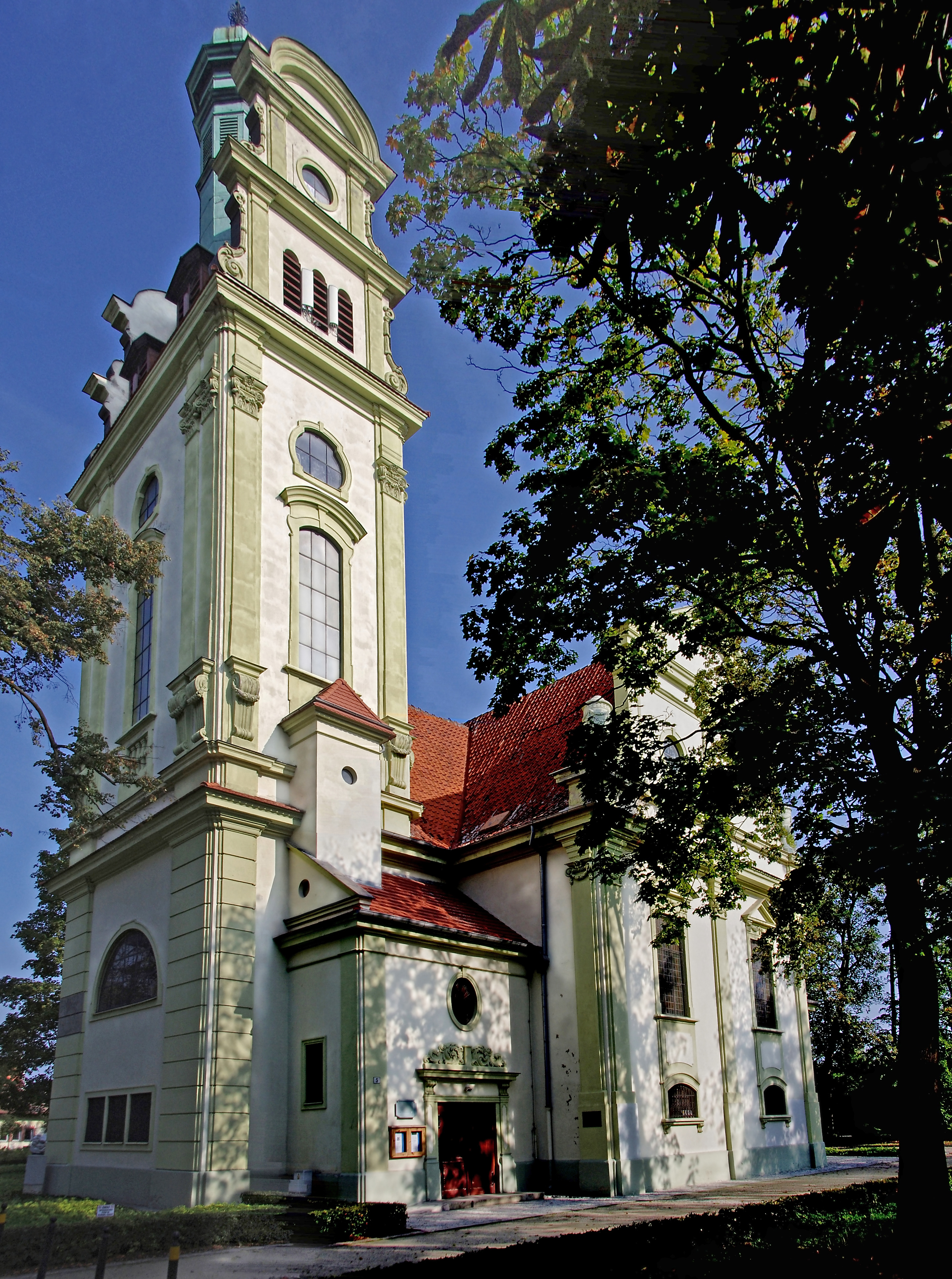
- Church in Sopot

Location
- Country: Poland
- Headquarters: Sopot
- Denomination: Evangelical Church of the Augsburg Confession in Poland

Current leadership
- Bishop: Marcin Hintz

The Diocese of Pomerania-Greater Poland is one of the six dioceses constituting the Evangelical Church of the Augsburg Confession in Poland. The cathedral of the diocese is the Church of the Redeemer, Sopot.

== Location ==
The Diocese of Pomerania-Greater Poland is located in western Poland. Its territory includes Greater Poland Voivodeship, Pomeranian Voivodship, Kujawy, and the eastern part of West Pomeranian Voivodship.

== List of bishops ==
- Gustaw Manitius : 1937~1940
  - Vacant (1940~1946)
- Ryszard Trenkler : 1946~1959
- Edward Dietz : 1960~1983
- Tadeusz Raszyk : 1983~1992
- Michał Warczyński : 1992~2011
- Marcin Hintz : 2011~
