= Bogusze =

Bogusze may refer to the following places:

- Bogusze, Bielsk County in Podlaskie Voivodeship (north-east Poland)
- Bogusze, Sokółka County in Podlaskie Voivodeship (north-east Poland)
- Bogusze, Warmian-Masurian Voivodeship (north Poland)

== See also ==
- Bogusz, a surname
