= Andrey Bogush =

Finnish artist

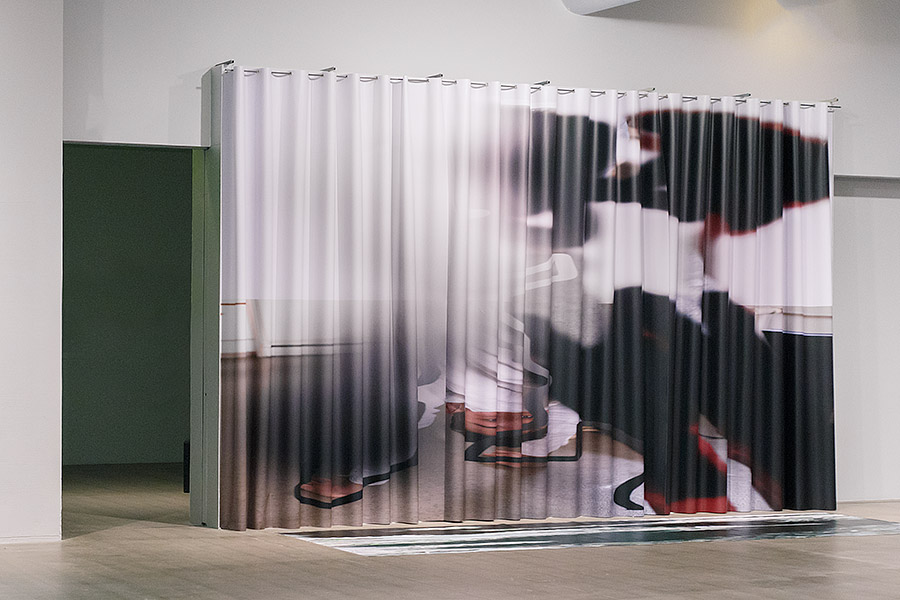
- installation view, Andrey Bogush: When Everything Is Over So We Can Discuss, The Finnish Museum Of Photography, Helsinki
- Born: 1987 (age 38–39); Saint Petersburg, Russia
- Education: Academy of Fine Arts, Helsinki, Saint Petersburg State University
- Known for: Visual Art, Photography, Installation Art
- Movement: Postinternet
- Website: http://b0gush.eu

Andrey Bogush is a Russian born artist living and working in Helsinki, Finland. Bogush is known for his photography-based works, large installations and readings. For his recent exhibition “When Everything Is Over So We Can Discuss", "Bogush renders quotidian photographs —shot while working at home or in nature— with digital patterns and hazy swaths or scribbles of color. Pulling these images off the screen and into sculptural space, Bogush printed them on industrial vinyl and has hung them as rippled curtains lining the walls or as flat carpets on the floor".

Bogush has shown at NRW-Forum Düsseldorf, Düsseldorf, Germany (2017), The Finnish Museum of Photography, Helsinki (2016), SIC space, Helsinki (2016), Bid Project gallery, Milan (2016), Kunsthalle Helsinki, Helsinki (2015), Christophe Guye Galerie, Zurich (2015), TATE Modern, London, Great Britain (2015), Unseen Photo Fair, Amsterdam, Netherlands (2014), Festival International de Photographie d’Hyères, France (2011), Chelsea Art Museum, New-York (2011), and internationally.

His publications include the artist's book Yellow published by Conveyor Editions as well as features in The Plantation Journal, Objektiv Magazine, Foam Magazine and British Journal of Photography. Recently, his works have been included in Photography is Magic book by Charlotte Cotton published by Aperture (2015), and Unlocked book by Atopos, Greece (2016).
