= Lutheran Diocese of Katowice =

Diocese of Katowice Diecezja katowicka
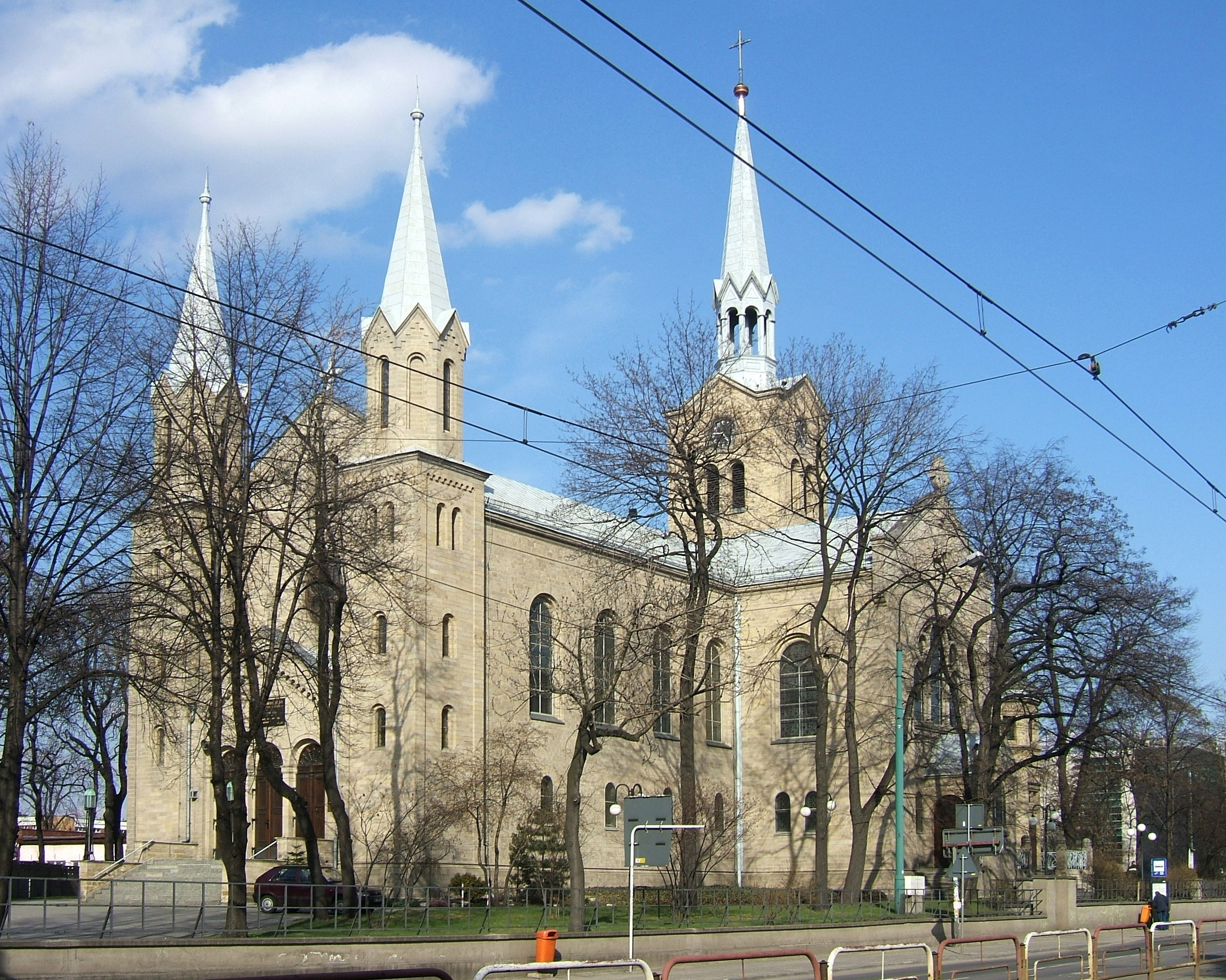
- Church in Katowice

Location
- Country: Poland
- Headquarters: Katowice

Statistics
- Members: 14 000
- Denomination: Evangelical Church of the Augsburg Confession in Poland

Current leadership
- Bishop: Marian Niemiec

The Lutheran Diocese of Katowice is one of the six dioceses that constitute the Polish Lutheran Church.

== Location ==
Located in southern Poland, its territory of the Lutheran Diocese of Katowice includes Silesia, Opole, Lesser Poland, and Polish Subcarpathia.

== List of bishops ==
- Robert Fiszkal : 1946~1950
- Alfred Hauptman : 1950~1981
- Rudolf Pastucha : 1981~2002
- Tadeusz Szurman : 2002~2014
- Marian Niemiec : 2014~
