= Ryszard Bogusz =

Polish Lutheran bishop (born 1951)

Ryszard Bogusz (born 2 March 1951 in Bielsko-Biała) is a Polish Lutheran theologian and bishop of the diocese Wrocław of the Evangelical Augsburg Church in Poland.

In 1976, he entered as vicar the parish Church Opatrzności Bożej (destiny of God) in Wrocław. In 1981, he entered the Church as administrator and became then minister of the Church. Since 1984, he is the bishop within the diocese Wrocław of the Polish Evangelical Church.

Ryszard Bogusz is an initiator of many international contacts between different Churches, and he is the current secretary of the Polish Ecumenical Council where there are many other Protestant Churches.
