= Evangelical Church of the Augsburg Confession in Poland =

Lutheran denomination

Evangelical Church of the Augsburg Confession in the Republic of Poland
- Kościół Ewangelicko-Augsburski w Rzeczypospolitej Polskiej
- Classification: Protestant
- Orientation: Lutheranism
- Polity: Episcopal
- Bishop of the Church: Jerzy Samiec
- Associations: Conference of European Churches, Lutheran World Federation, Polish Ecumenical Council, World Council of Churches
- Region: Poland
- Origin: 16th century
- Separated from: Catholic Church
- Members: 61,217
- Official website: Official website

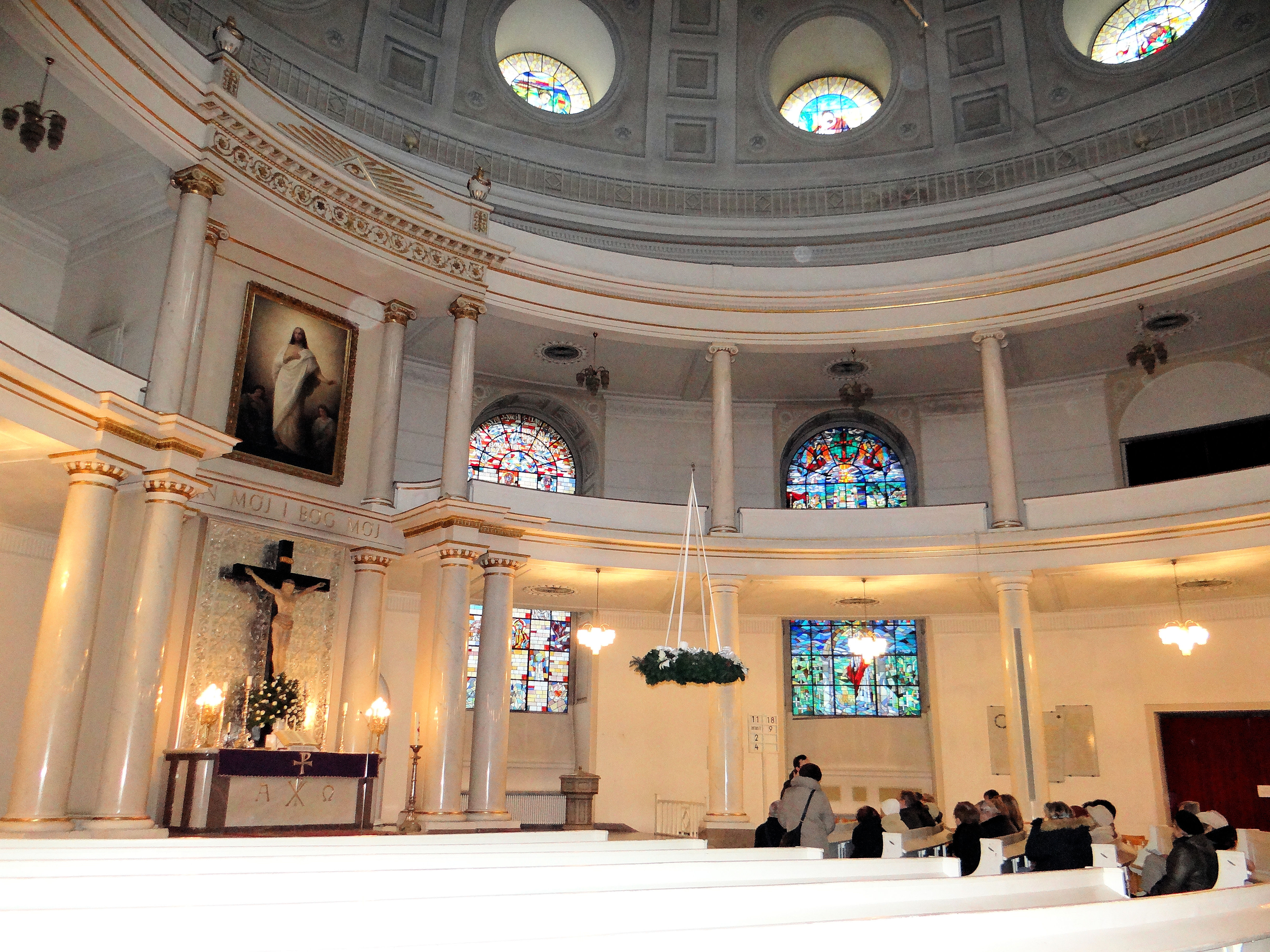
Holy Trinity Church, Warsaw, of Evangelical Church of Augsburg Confession in Poland.

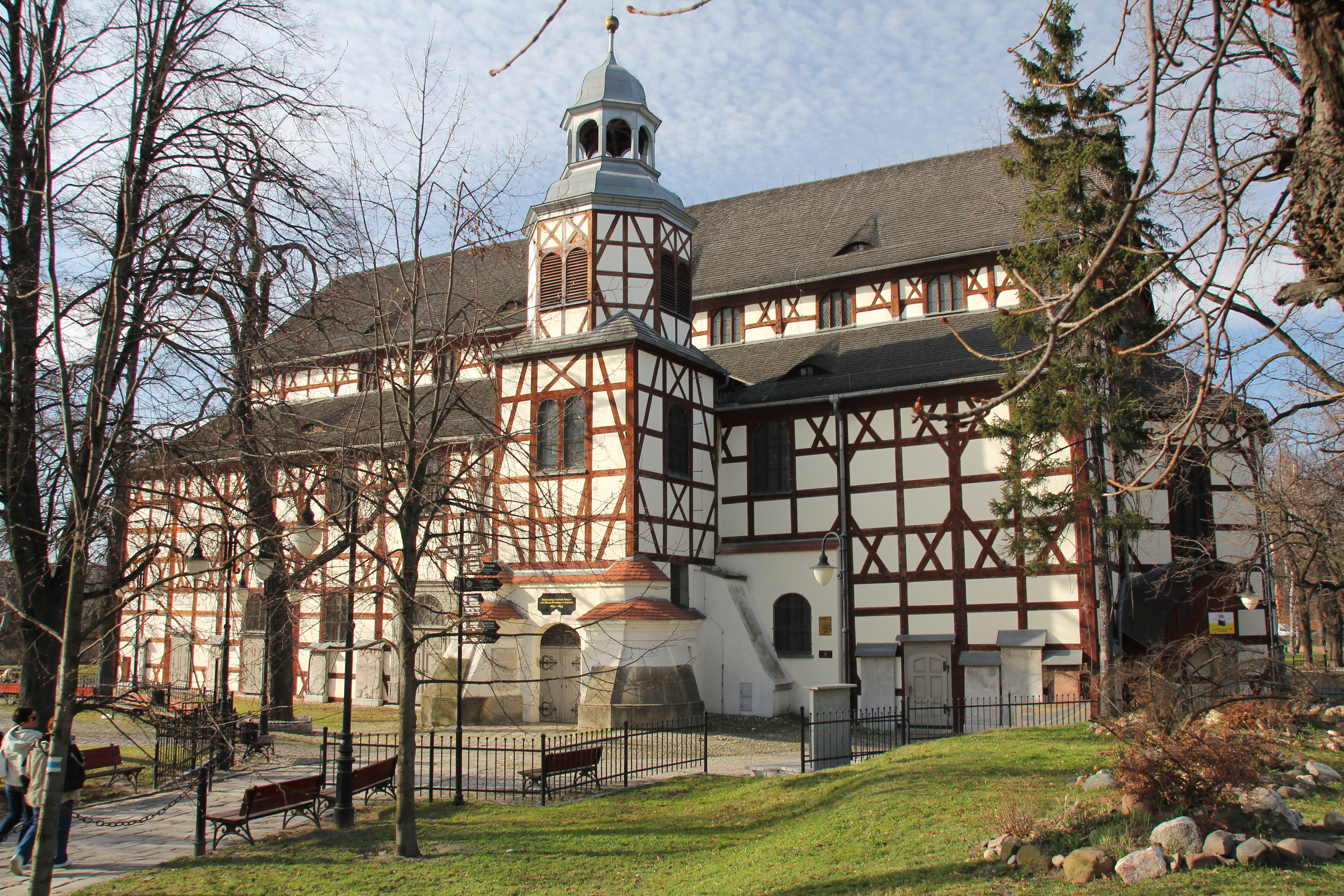
Lutheran Church of Peace in Jawor- UNESCO World Heritage Site

The Evangelical Church of the Augsburg Confession in the Republic of Poland (Polish: Kościół Ewangelicko-Augsburski w Rzeczypospolitej Polskiej) is a Lutheran denomination and the largest Protestant body in Poland with about 61,000 members and 133 parishes.

== History ==
The Evangelical Church of the Augsburg Confession stems from the Reformation which began in October 1517. The first Lutheran sermons took place in 1518, and in 1523 the first Lutheran dean, Johann Heß, was called to the city of Breslau, then under Bohemia, whence from Lutheranism spread through the Polish lands.

In interwar Poland the Evangelical-Augsburg church was the largest Protestant denomination, with about half a million followers, but unlike in post-WWII Poland it was not the only Lutheran church in the country. It competed for the hearts of Lutherans living in the territory of the revived Polish state with the Evangelical Union Church in Greater Poland (part of the former Prussian territory), with the Augsburg and Helvetic Evangelical Church in the areas of the Austrian partition, and with other churches. Its adherents dominated in the Protestant circles in central Poland, which had formed part of Russia prior to 1918, while the other churches were based in the south and west of the newly established country. In 1918 the Lutheran parishes of Cieszyn Silesia were incorporated into the structures of the Evangelical-Augsburg church, raising the overall number of its followers by about 100,000, although about half of these parishes left the church in 1920 when a significant section of the area became part of Czechoslovakia following the Polish-Czechoslovak War of January 1919. They were later reincorporated in 1938 when Poland annexed Trans-Olza following the Munich Agreement.

The greatest challenge for the church before the outbreak of World War II in 1939 was the problem of nationalism, as about three quarters of all adherents in 1939 were German, and the remaining quarter Polish. In the diocese of Łódź, largest in terms of the Lutheran population, more than 98% Lutherans were German, while in Silesia, comparable in terms of the number of adherents, more than 80% were Polish. German believers accused bishop Juliusz Bursche (bishop from 1936) of Polonizing the church, which faced the danger of a split along national lines.

An important moment for the Evangelical-Augsburg church was the issuing of a presidential decree in 1936 which established the nature of the relationship between the church and the state and the former's internal structure. The decree affirmed the territorial division of the church into ten dioceses (Warsaw, Płock, Kalisz, Piotrków, Lublin, Łódź, Volhynia, Vilnius, Silesia and Greater Poland) with a total of 117 parishes.

The church in Poland suffered during and after World War II. The ranks of pastors, teachers and other church leadership diminished due to persecution, imprisonment, and death. The majority of ethnic Germans moved west from 1944 onwards. During the early postwar years, a number of church properties were taken over by the Communist authorities to be used for other purposes, and the connections of Protestant Lutheranism to the German cultural sphere made authorities and Polish locals inimical towards the remaining Lutherans. Gradually, the Evangelical Church of Augsburg Confession in Poland has reshaped itself into an active body. On 12 October 2008, Polish president Lech Kaczyński—himself of the Catholic faith—visited the Lutheran Protestant Jesus Church in Cieszyn, becoming the first President of Poland ever to visit a Protestant place of worship.

Women first began administering baptism, serving as deacons, and leading services in the church in 1999. In 2022 the church ordained women as pastors for the first time. In 2024, a pastor in the church, Halina Radacz, one of the first women ordained, offered the first documented blessings by pastors of same-sex couples in Poland.

== Contemporary ==
The church's six dioceses form a wide swath from north to south down the middle of Poland—from Warmia-Masuria and Gdańsk in the north, near the Baltic, to the region west and southwest of Kraków in the south, toward the Czech Republic border. Direct descendants of Reformation forebears live in the south, around Upper Silesia. That is also where most Polish Lutherans can be found, with c. 47,000 of the church's followers (about three quarters of all adherents) living in Silesian Voivodeship. The 2011 census data points to a very uneven distribution of the Polish Lutheran population across the country, particularly scarce in the eastern provinces.

The church has 133 parishes, 186 churches and 151 chapels, and is served by 153 pastors and other church workers. Many pastors serve multiple preaching points and are challenged by diverse demands as well as the need for innovation in a rapidly changing society. The congregations are self-governing, and each has its own parish council.

As of 2018, there were 61,217 adherent faithful in the church. Though numbers of church members are currently lower than they were in the past (87,300 baptized members in 2000, 77,500 in 2005), the Evangelical Church of the Augsburg Confession still remains the largest Protestant body in Poland.

As a Lutheran church in a country that is nearly 90 percent Roman Catholic, the church faces challenges in upholding a Protestant education at various levels, whether in Sunday schools, catechetical instruction, or in connection with the public schools, where Catholic religious education is part of the curriculum. The main priorities of the church are in deaconic work among single, old, and disabled persons; women's and youth work; and in evangelism.

Followers of the Evangelical Church of the Augsburg Confession in the Republic of Poland (2011 census)
Voivodeship	Adherents	%
POLAND	70766	100
Lower Silesian	2140	3.0
Kuyavian-Pomeranian	688	1.0
Lublin	339	0.5
Lubusz	630	0.9
Łódź	1462	2.1
Lesser Poland	994	1.4
Masovian	3593	5.1
Opole	1601	2.3
Subcarpathian	100	0.1
Podlaskie	187	0.3
Pomeranian	921	1.3
Silesian	51009	72.1
Holy Cross	142	0.2
Warmian-Masurian	4466	6.3
Greater Poland	1300	1.8
West Pomeranian	1194	1.7

== Leadership ==
The senior ordained member of the denomination is called the Bishop of the Church. The office is filled by election, and the Bishop of the Church serves for ten years. He is based at the Church headquarters in Warsaw. The Church's official website describes the role of the Bishop of the Church as: "His service is to minister the Word of God and the Sacraments. He also guards the whole Church (episcope), so that God's Word is proclaimed faithfully and clearly. The Bishop of the Church is the “Pastor of the pastors” (Pastor pastorum)." The office is currently held by Bishop Jerzy Samiec.

Under the Bishop of the Church there are four authoritative bodies. The House of Bishops consists of the Bishop of the Church (Primate) and the six diocesan bishops. The Church Synod is the main decision-making body, and consists of all ordained bishops, 15 representative ordained pastors, and 30 members of laity from across the diocesan synods. The Synod Council is a small standing committee, competent to conduct certain synodical functions between meetings of the full Church Synod. The Consistory of the Church is a senior steering group which has authority to make wide-ranging decisions in terms of the day to day administration of the church. It is chaired by the Bishop of the Church, together with a Vice-President, and six other members (three ordained, three lay).

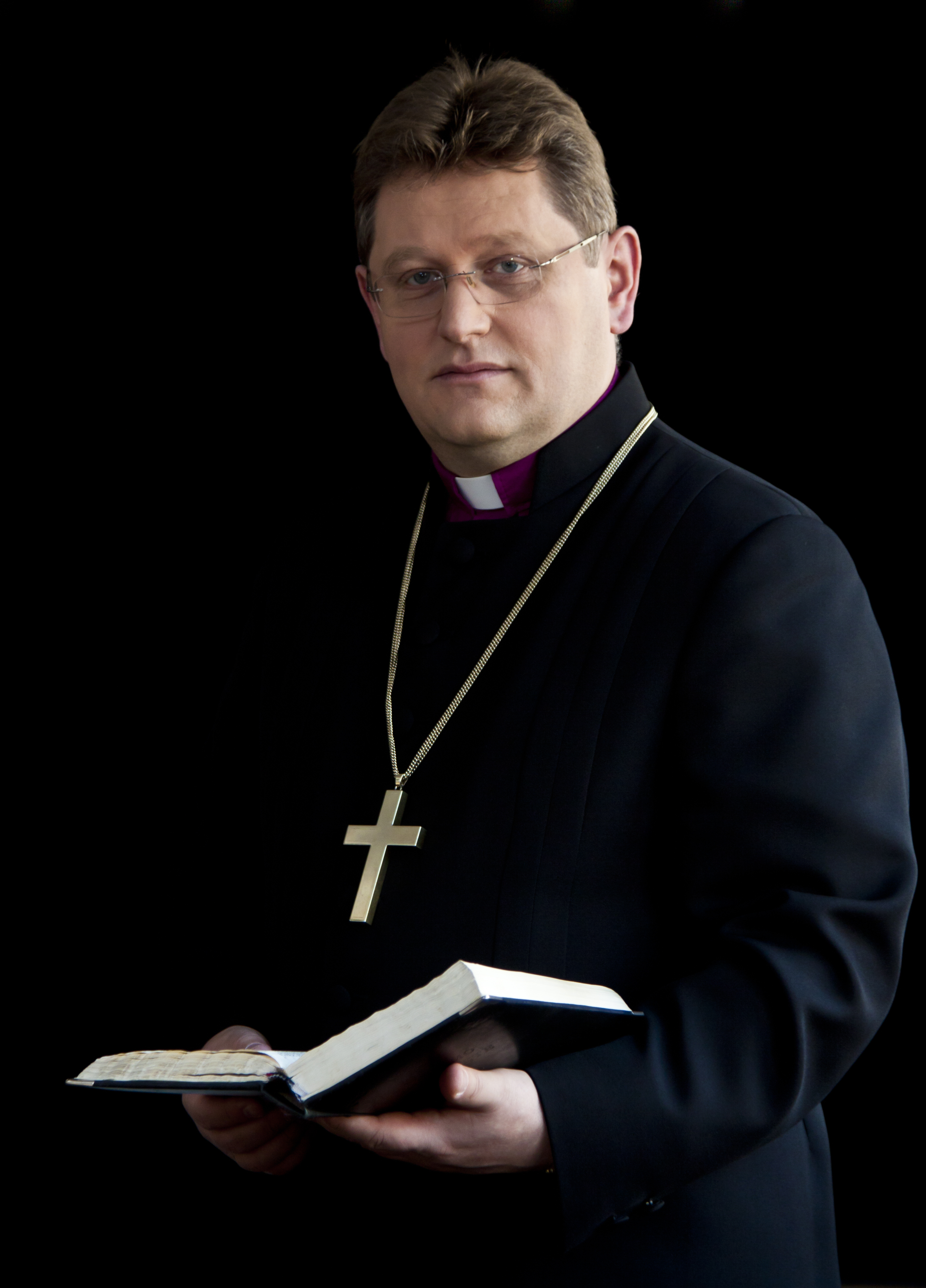
Jerzy Samiec

№	In office	Bishop
1	1904–1942	ks. dr Juliusz Bursche
-	1945–1951	ks. prof. Jan Szeruda
2	1951–1959	ks. dr Karol Kotula
3	1959–1975	ks. prof. Andrzej Wantuła
4	1975–1991	ks. dr Janusz Narzyński
5	1991–2001	ks. dr Jan Szarek
6	2001–2010	ks. Janusz Jagucki
7	2010–	ks. Jerzy Samiec

== List of Bishops ==
- Bishop of the Church (Primate and Metropolitan)
- Bishop of Cieszyn
- Bishop of Katowice
- Bishop of Masuria
- Bishop of Pomerania-Greater Poland
- Bishop of Warsaw
- Bishop of Wrocław

== Churches ==
- Holy Trinity Church, Warsaw
- Jesus Church (Cieszyn)
- St. Matthew's Church, Łódź
- Evangelical-Augsburg Church Lublin

== Notable Polish Lutherans ==
- Juliusz Bursche, the first Bishop of the Evangelical Church of the Augsburg Confession in Poland
- Jerzy Buzek, prime minister of Poland from 1997 to 2001, President of the European Parliament 2009 to 2012
- Adam Małysz, Polish former ski jumper, one of the most successful ski jumpers in the history of the sport
- Jerzy Pilch, one of the most important contemporary Polish writers and journalists

== See also ==
- List of Lutheran dioceses and archdioceses
