= Boguslawski family with Ostoja coat of arms =

Polish noble family, Polish knighthood family

Polish medieval CoA Ostoja

The Scibor-Bogusławski family – a Polish noble family with the coat of arms of Ostoja, belonging to the heraldic Clan Ostoje (Moscics), originating from Bogusławice in the former Sieradz Province, Radomsko County.

== Family surname ==
The surname of the Bogusławski family of the Ostoja coat of arms is the name of Ścibor (Czścibor, Czcibor). It is an Old Polish male name meaning one who worships the fight. The surname of the Bogusławski family probably comes from Ścibor of Bogusławice, coat of arms Ostoja, who lived in the mid-15th century. The first, found in sources, Bogusławski using the nickname Ścibor was Jan Ściborek of Bogusławice, who lived at the turn of the 15th and 16th centuries.

== The oldest source certificates concerning the family ==
Listed below are selected source certificates concerning the Scibor-Bogusławski family up to the end of the 16th century:

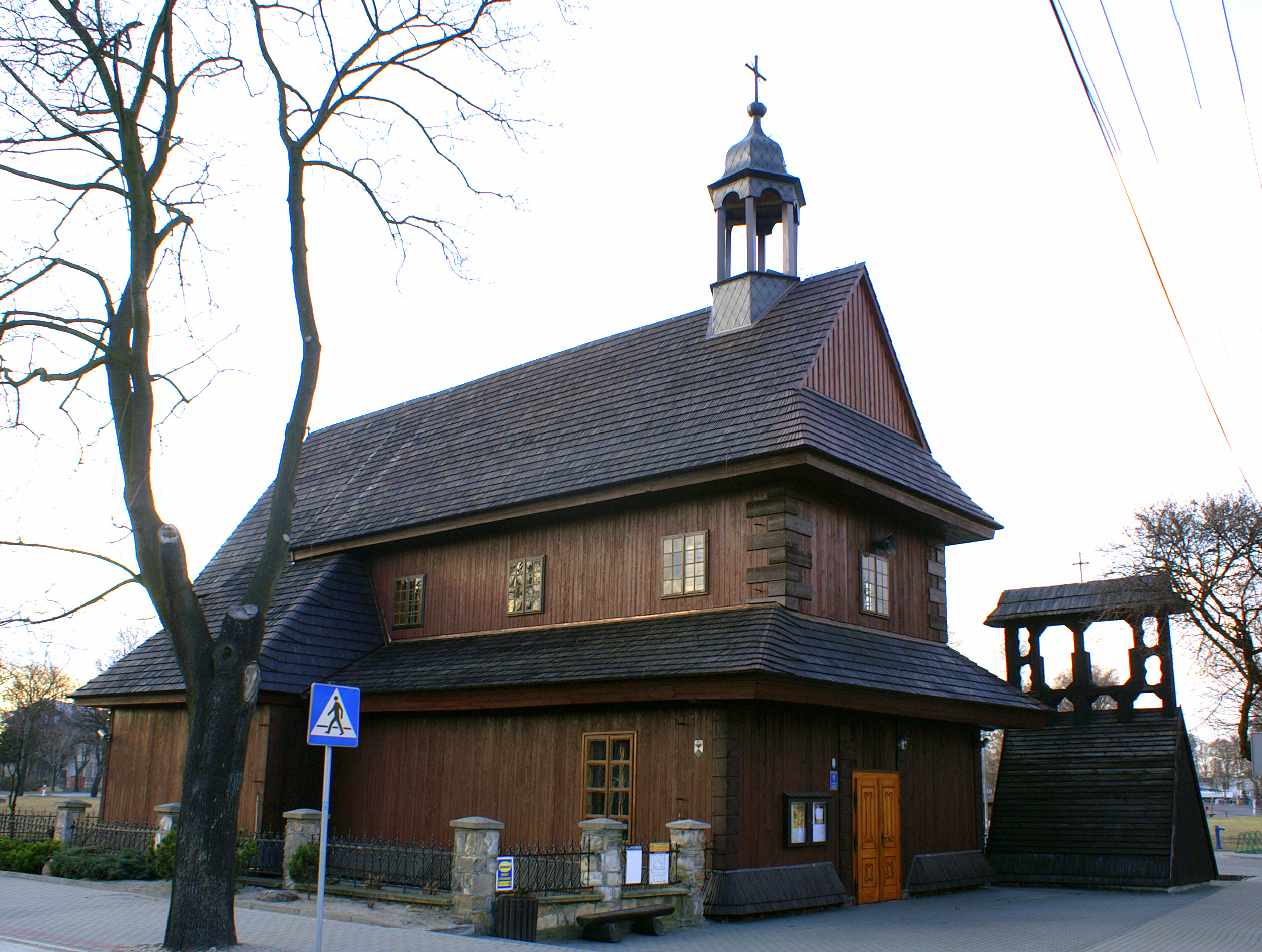
St. Ducha Cathidral of Łask, financed in the years 1669-1673 from the property of Wrzeszczewice, which at that time belonged to Marcin Ścibor-Bogusławski

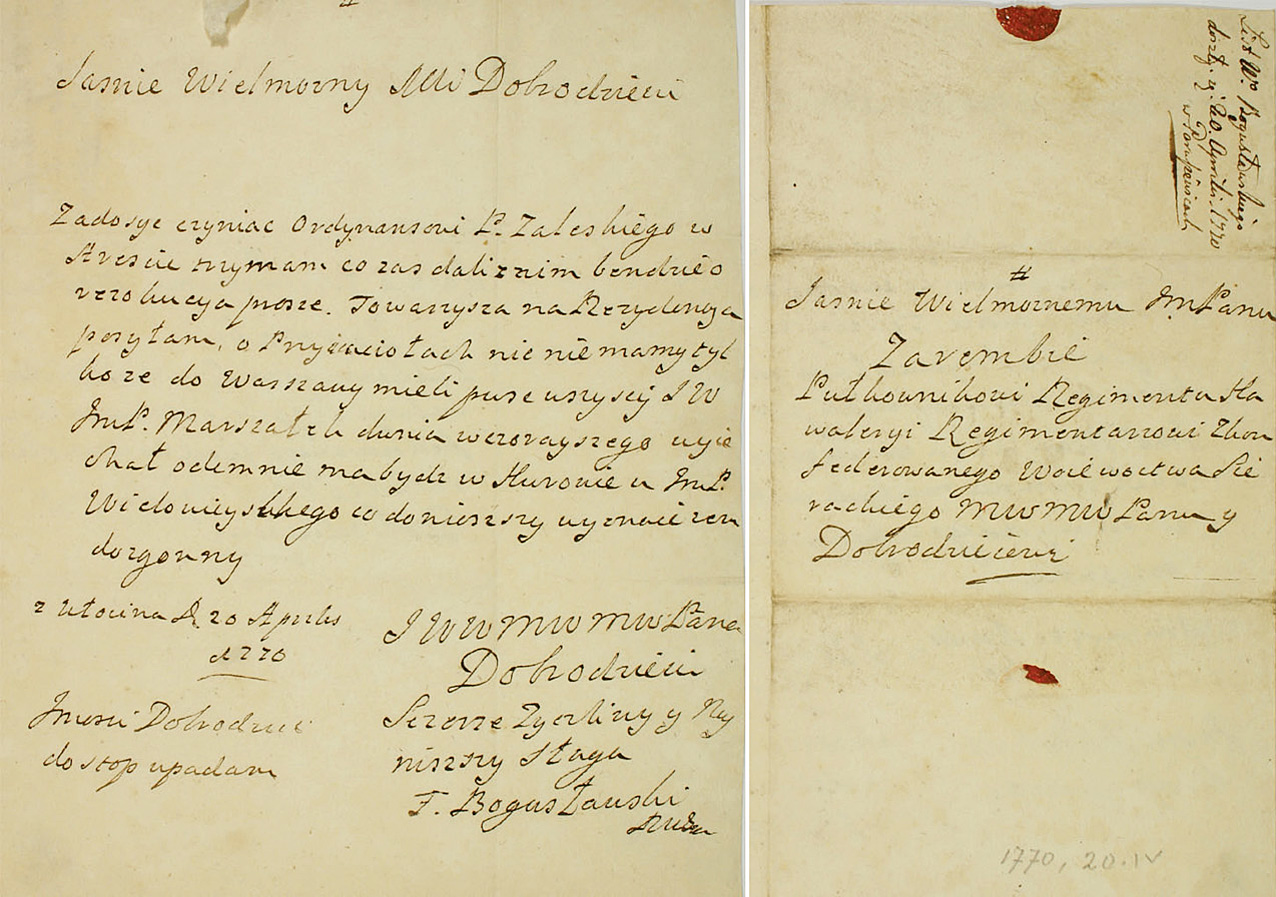
Letter from Franciszek Bogusławski to regimentar Józef Zaremba from 1770, collection of the Kórnik Library

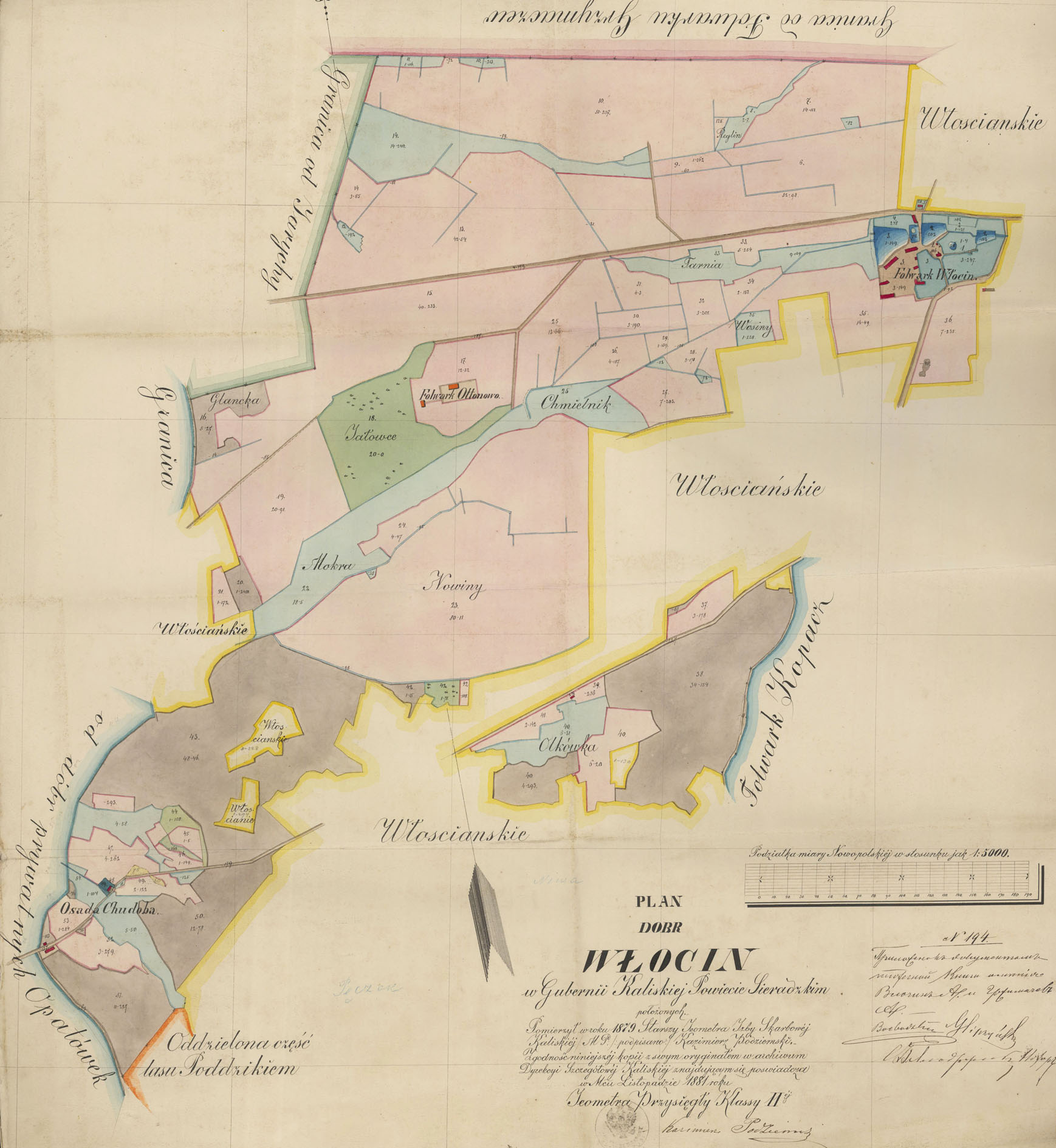
Włocin - map of land properties from 1881

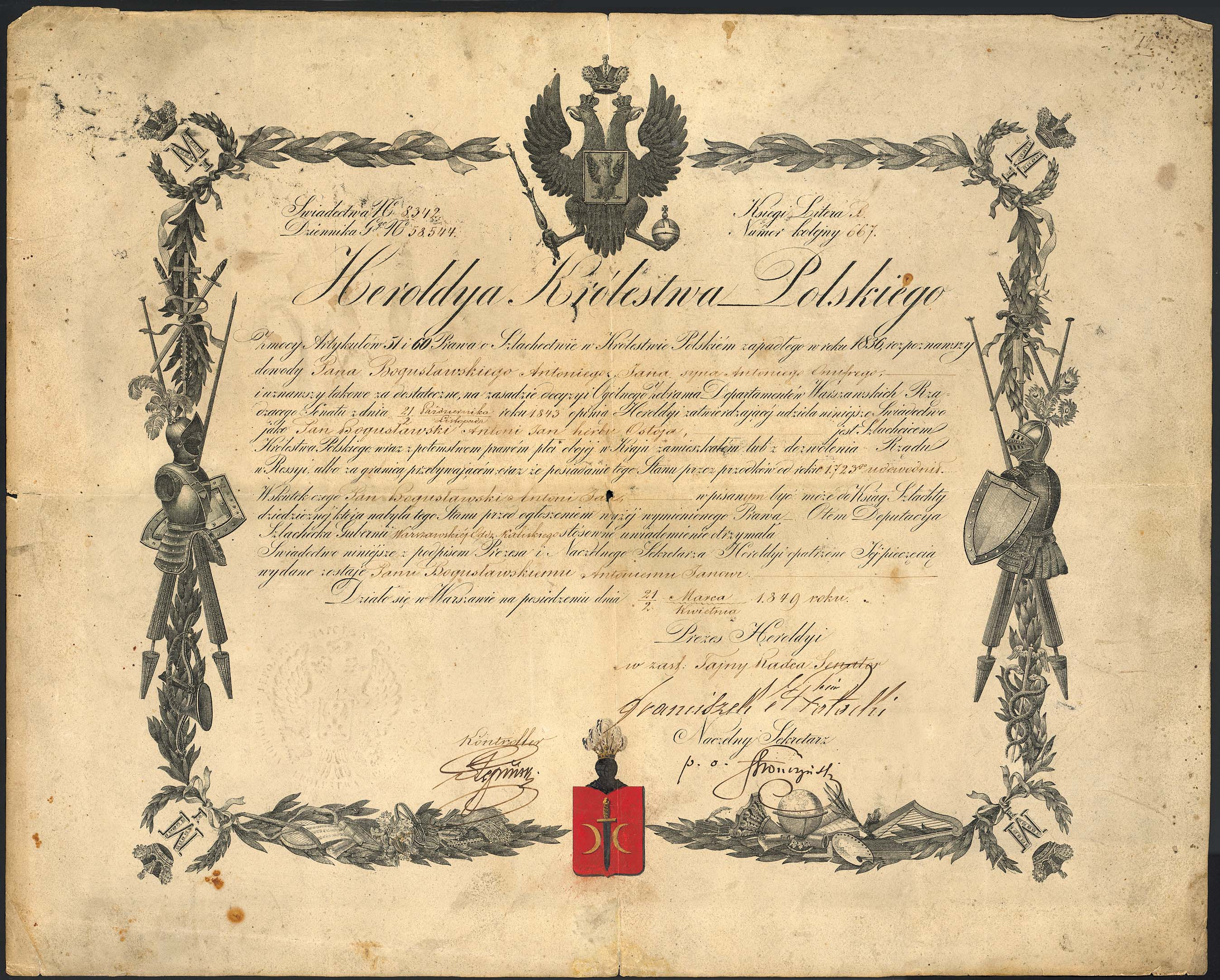
Nobility card issued in 1849 by the Heroldia of the Kingdom of Poland to Antoni Jan Bogusławski, co-owner of Korczewo

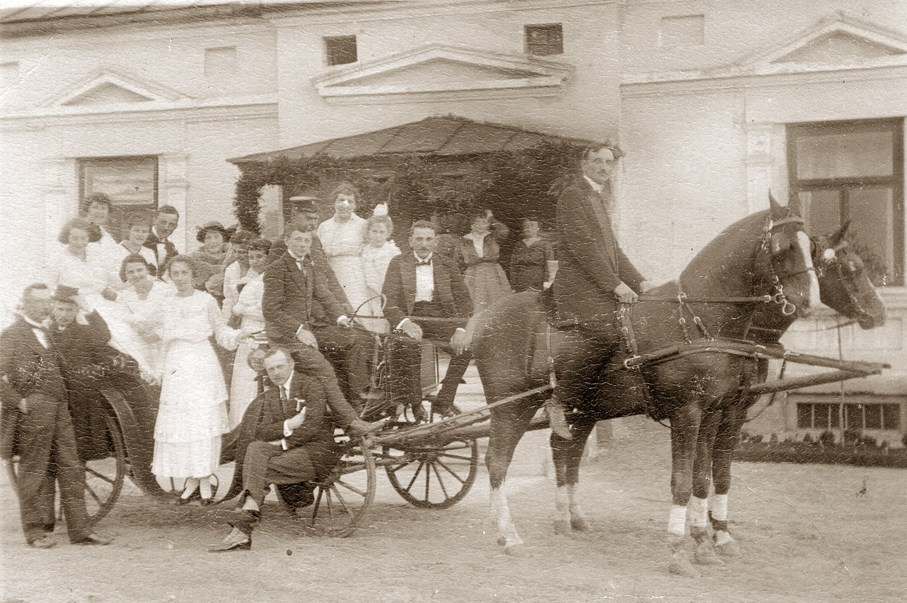
The Ścibor-Bogusławski manor in Wilkowice

- The oldest mention of the village of Bogusławice, being the ancestral nest of the Bogusławski family, Ostoja coat of arms, dates from 1400 and concerns the knight Przecław from Bogusławice, who sued Michał from Golanka for a stolen sword.
- The oldest record about a representative of the Bogusławski family, the Ostoja coat of arms, comes from 1405 and tells about Maciej from Bogusławice, Ostoja coat of arms, who witnessed the case of Jan of Łyskornia, reprimanded in the nobility by Maciej of Raczyna.
- In 1428, Leonard of Bogusławice, Ostoja coat of arms is mentioned, who together with Maciej from Bogusławice witnessed the case of Stefan of Ules in the Sieradz land, reprimanded by Jan Kolano from Ulesie.
- In the years 1445 to 1480, the above-mentioned Scibor of Bogusławice, Ostoja coat of arms appears in the sources. In 1445, in Radomsko, he denied the nobility of Stanisław of Brzeźnica and Jajeki of the Ostoja coat of arms. In 1480, he is mentioned as a witness in a document confirming the right of John of Dąbrowa to own part of the property in Dąbrowa. Scibor from Bogusławice had a daughter Katarzyna, the wife of Mikołaj of Sromutka and Grębocin, and a son, Maciej, who assisted his sister in 1492, when she received a dowry of 60 money from his brother-in-law, Andrzej of Sromutka, in exchange for giving up goods in Sromutka and Grębociny.
- In 1503, Jan Ściborek from Bogusławice, Ostoja coat of arms sued Stanisław Łowieński, the parish priest from Borowna, for the tithe collected from the fields and farms for the parish church in Borownie. The document on this matter is in the collection of the Diocesan Archives in Włocławek.
- In the conscription registers of the province of Sieradz in 1552 – Wojciech Ścibor (Sczybur) and Maciej Ściborowicz (Scziborowicz), who together had 4 fields in Bogusławice.
- In 1556 there are mentioned brothers – Maciej, Andrzej and Jan, sons of Wojciech Ścibor Bogusławski, Ostoja coat of arms and Zuzanna Koczańska, who made divisions in Bogusławice after their father's death. According to the division document, the Bogusławskis owned a farm in Bogusławice, lands and meadows called Serwińskie, a field and Kuzaliowska fields, a manor farm with gardens, orchards and a pond, and had three fields of peasants' land
- Dr. Franciszek Piekosiński in his studies of the Treasury books (no. 7 and 8) mentioned Jan Bogusławski, the Ostoja coat of arms, active in the 1670s, an official (servant) of Mikołaj Mielecki, voivode of Podolia.
- Adam Boniecki in "Herbarz Polski" mentions Jan Ścibor Bogusławski of the Ostoja coat of arms, who in 1597 secured 1200 flowers to his wife, Dorota née Tarnowska from Tarnowska Wola. According to Boniecki, in 1603 the same Jan Ścibor proved his noble origin in Piotrków by presenting witnesses, including his cousins – Wojciech and Marcin Bogusławski and relatives – Andrzej Koczański and Wojciech Chrzanowski. Jan Scibor Bogusławski is also mentioned by prof. Włodzimierz Dworzaczek that on December 14, 1597 he concluded a contract under the facility of 2,000 zlots. with Jan Tarnowski, bishop of Poznań and vice-chancellor. Jan Bogusławski was also one of the executors of the will of Archbishop Tarnowski, who died in 1605.
- In the Archives of Dzikowski of the Tarnowski family, there are three documents stating that Jan Ścibor Bogusławski made in the years 1598 to 1601 a change of Gluzy's own property into Wawrowice belonging to the salary of Jan Wielicki, the dean of the Sandomierz collegiate church. This change was approved by: Pope Klemens VIII, Polish king Zygmunt III and the Bishop of Krakow, Jerzy Radziwiłł.
- Kasper Niesiecki in "Polish Herbarz" mentions Mikołaj, Jan and Piotr Ściborów from Bogusławice of the Ostoja coat of arms, and their sister Elżbieta, married to Adam Janowski, a Kraków deputy.
- In 1598, Jan Bogusławski Scibor (Sczibor) is mentioned as the heir of a part of Scziborowska in Bogusławice

== The estates belonging to the family ==
The most important lands belonging to the Ścibor-Bogusławskis from the 15th to the 20th centuries are listed below.

Bogusławice, Gluzy, Wawrowice, Stryje Paskowe Wrzeszczewice, Czyżów, Sulisławice, Włocin, Grzymaczew Smaszków, Stok, Pawłówek, Zawady, Chrusty, Czepów Dolny Korczew, Wilkowice.

== Family representatives ==
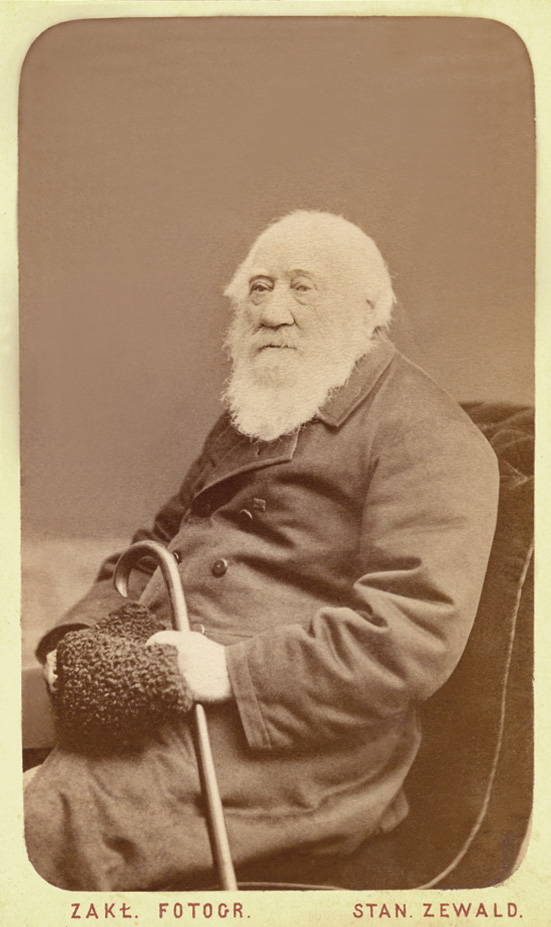
Wojciech Ścibor-Bogusławski (1794–1882), lieutenant of the troops of the Duchy of Warsaw and the Kingdom of Poland

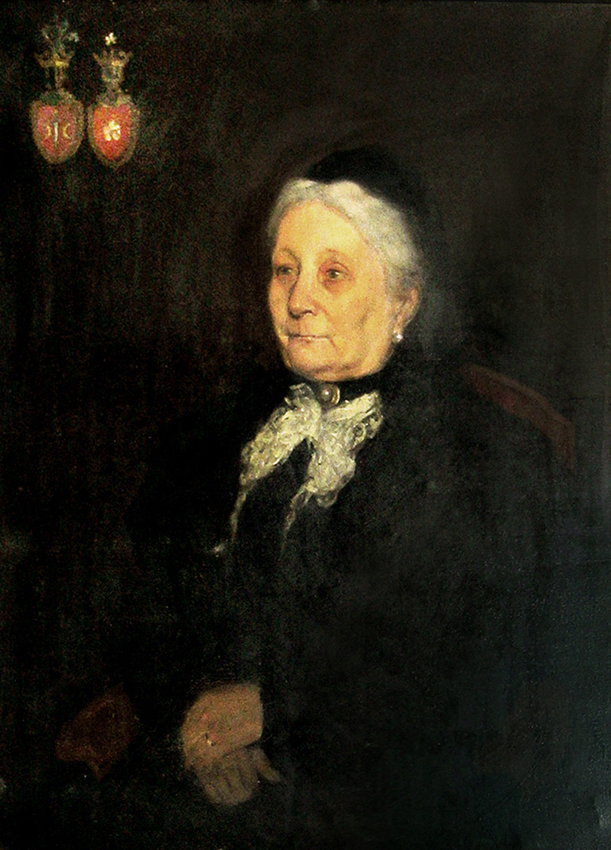
Portrait of Karolina Ścibor-Bogusławska (1837–1880), wife of Maksymilian Pstrokoński, Poraj coat of arms, daughter of Wojciech and Michalina née Przeuski

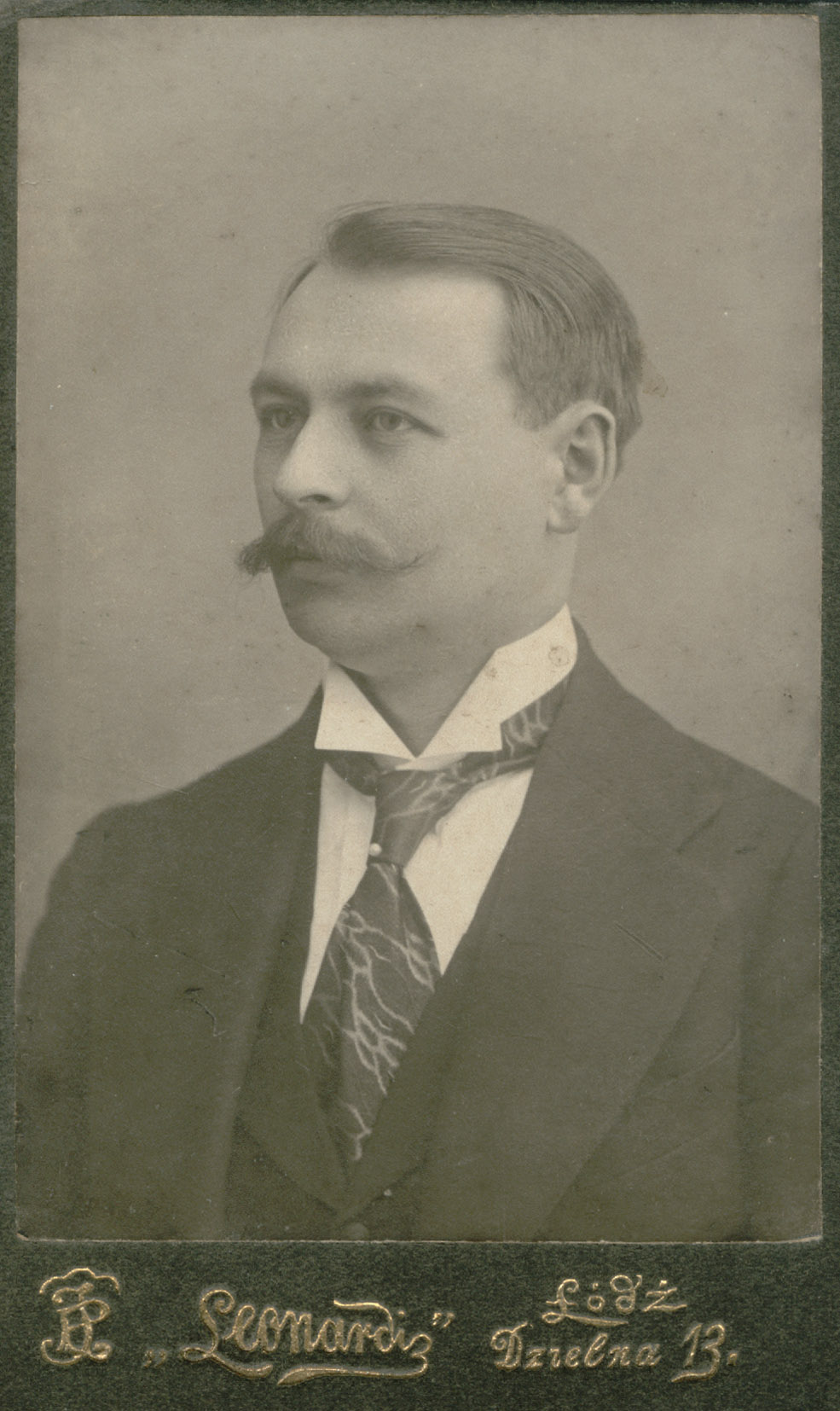
Kazimierz Ścibor-Bogusławski, director Bank Spółdzielczy in Łódź

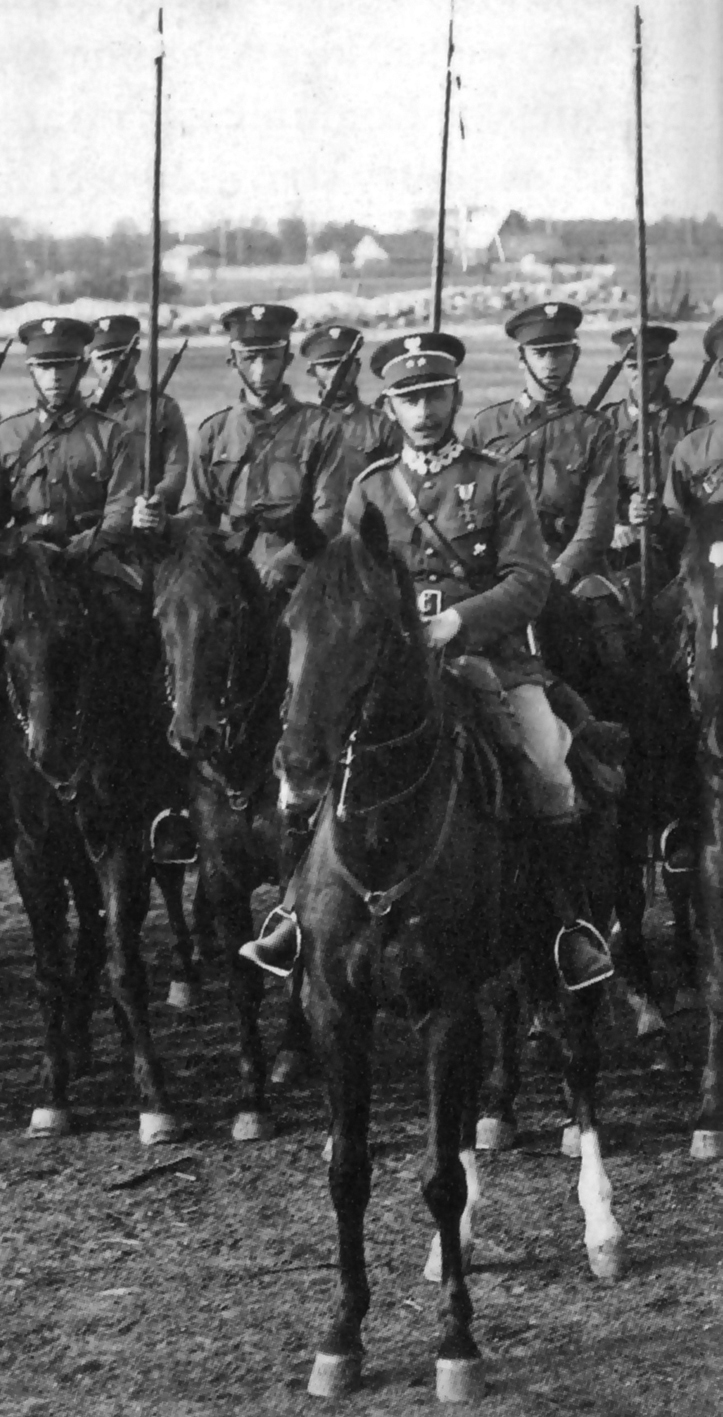
Capt. Stefan Ścibor-Bogusławski at the head of the unit

- Maciej of Bogusławice (died after 1428) - heir in Bogusławice and Jacków in the first half of the 15th century.
- Scibor of Bogusławice (died after 1480) - heir in Bogusławice in the mid-15th century.
- Marcin of Bogusławice Bogusławski (died after 1606) - the owner of the landed estates in Stryia Paskowe, son of Jan Bogusławski called Scibor and Helena née Wolski. In February 1598, Bogusławski sold a field of land in this village called Ziembiński and a part of the habitat to Krystyna née Gliński, the wife of Walenty Lubczyński, for the sum of 300 zlotys. The deed of purchase and sale was concluded in Piotrków and entered into the local town books. This transaction was then approved by Katarzyna Glińska, his spouse. He sold the remaining parts in Stryi Stripki to Mikołaj Łaskawski in 1602. The second wife of Marcin Bogusławski was Małgorzata Piorunowska, whom he secured 400 zlotys this year dowry and 400 zlotys an allowance on half of all goods you own. They had a son, Marcin, the heir of Wrzeszczewice.
- Andrzej Ścibor Bogusławski (died after 1635) - the proprietor of the Częstochowa voivode. On March 10, 1635, King Władysław IV allowed Bogusławski to give up his life rights to the head of the town of Częstochowa in favor of Stanisław of Pilcza Koryciński, a Krakow cup bearer and his wife Katarzyna née Gawron.
- Scibor Bogusławski (died after 1673) - heir of Czyżów, member of the election Sejm in 1669.
- Piotr Ścibor Bogusławski (died 1674) – capitular prelate, scholastic of the Wojnica chapter (was installed at the scholasteria on February 20, 1664).
- Marcin Ścibor-Bogusławski (died 1676) – heir of Wrzeszczewice, elector of king Michał Korybut, donor to the hospital church of St. Of the Spirit and the collegiate chapter in Łask. He was the son of Marcin and Małgorzata née Piorunowska. His wife was Katarzyna Rościeska (seu Rościerska), Rola coat of arms, with whom he had sons: Fr. Stanisław, Jan, Wojciech and Marcin, husband of Marianna née Rosowska, Korab coat of arms.
- Stanisław Ścibor-Bogusławski (died 1696) - heir of Wrzeszczewice, canon of grace, Przemyśl, Włocławek, custodian of Wolbórz, provost from Brzozów, surrogate judge of the Consistory of the Kujawsko-Pomorskie Diocese, twice nominated for the office of judge of the Central Tribunal of the Crown, chancellor of the Cardinal M. S. Radziejowskiego to 1696. Wrzeszczewice gave way to brother Marcin in 1671. He was the son of Marcin and Katarzyna née Rościeska, Rola coat of arms.
- Andrzej Ścibor-Bogusławski (died 1729) – instigator of the Crown Tribunal in 1700, regent of the town of Sieradz, border bailiff of Łęczyca and Sieradz in the years 1717-1729, judge of the commissioner court in 1719, heir of the estates of Sulisławice, Włocin and Grzymaczew. Married to Katarzyna Gorzyńska. He was the son of Marcin and Marianna née Rosowska, Korab coat of arms.
- Franciszek Ścibor-Bogusławski (died 1796) - captain in the Bar Confederation, ensign of the National Cavalry, deputy marshal of the Sieradz sejmik in 1761, heir of Smaszków, Włocin and Grzymaczew. He was the son of Andrzej and Katarzyna née Gorzyńska. Married twice - with Anna Jankowska and Anna Pruszkowska.
- Ignacy Piotr Ścibor-Bogusławski (1716-1793) - canon of Łęczyca, dean of Warta, builder of the church in Brzeźno, commissioner of the archbishopric of Gniezno in 1785. He was the son of Andrzej and Katarzyna née Gorzyńska.
- Jakub Ścibor-Bogusławski (died 1788) - the Bar Confederate, heir of Włocin and Grzymaczew. He was the son of Andrzej and Katarzyna née Gorzyńska. He married Marianna Chodakowska, Dołęga coat of arms.
- Krystyna Ścibor-Bogusławska (died 1783) - gifted for life by King Stanisław August Poniatowski with the head of Wągłczewo in 1773. She was the daughter of Franciszek and Anna née Jankowski. She got married twice - with Antoni Łubieński, the head of Wągłczewo and Józef Byszewski, a colonel of the Crown troops.
- Elżbieta Tekla Ścibor-Bogusławska (1768–1846) - heiress of parts of Włocin and Grzymaczew. She was the daughter of Franciszek and Anna née Pruszkowski. She married Michał Mokrski, heir of Kobyla Góra and Ciężkowice, chamberlain of King Stanisław August Poniatowski.
- Ignacy Ścibor-Bogusławski (died 1822) – Napoleonic soldier, lieutenant of the Polish Legions in Italy, landowner, property owner: Sokołów, Nowa Wieś, Stok, Zawady and others. He was the son of Jakub and Marianna née Chodakowska, Dołęga coat of arms. His wife was Wiktoria Morawska, Korab coat of arms, an aunt of Teodor and Teofil Morawski, members of the National Government during the November Uprising.
- Antonina Helena Ścibor-Bogusławska (1786–1841) – heiress of a part of Włocin and Grzymaczew. She was the daughter of Maksymilian and Faustina née Kiedrowska, Sas coat of arms. She was married twice - with Paweł Frankowski, the inspector at the customs house in Kalisz, and with Jan Walenty Opieliński, the mayor of Kalisz.
- Stanisław Ścibor-Bogusławski (1784-1859) - major in the 13th line infantry regiment during the November Uprising, decorated with the Knight's Cross of the Order of Virtuti Militari, heir of the Włocin and Stok properties. He was the son of Maksymilian and Faustina née Kiedrowska, Sas coat of arms.
- Wojciech Ścibor-Bogusławski (1794–1882) – lieutenant of the troops of the Duchy of Warsaw and the Kingdom of Poland, heir of the Włocin and Grzymaczew estates. He was the son of Maksymilian, a comrade of the Crown troops, and of Faustina née Kiedrowska, coat of arms Sas. His spouse was Michalina née Przeuski, coat of arms Sulima, heiress to Pawłówek, Czajków and Niedźwiadów.
- Hieronim Adam Tomasz Ścibor-Bogusławski (1803–1870) – friar, reformate, chronicler, preacher, Ordinary of the Congregation of Reformed Priests in Wieluń, vicar of grace, Sieradz, Kłomnica and Kamień, parish commander: Chwalborzyce, Wielenin, Głuchów, Dworszowice, Starokrzepice, Suchice and Suchice Kociszew. He was the son of Antoni Onufry and Salomea née Bobowska, Gryf coat of arms.
- Ignacy Napoleon Ścibor-Bogusławski (1807–1882) – parish priest from Mierzyn, participant in the January Uprising, owner of a part of Korczewo. He was the son of Antoni Onufry and Salomea née Bobowska, Gryf coat of arms.
- Petronela Tekla Ścibor-Bogusławska (1810–1846) – heiress of Korczewo. She was the daughter of Antoni Onufry and Salomea née Bobowska, Gryf coat of arms. She married Walenty Otocki, heir of Korczew. After Otocka's death, Korczew was owned in part by her brothers - Antoni Jan and Fr. Ignacy Napoleon Bogusławscy.
- Jan Nepomucen Ścibor-Bogusławski (1818–1890) – landowner, owner of land estates: Włocin and Grzymaczew, Stok, Dąbrowa Rusiecka, Ochle, Zawady, Chrusty, Czepów Dolny. He was the son of Stanisław and Urszula Załuskowska. His spouse was Paulina Niemojewska.
- Stanisław Juliusz Ścibor-Bogusławski (1864-1936) - the owner of Wilkowice. He was the son of Władysław Bogusławski and Józefa née Skotnicka, Rola coat of arms, heirs of the Zaborów estates. He married Anna Lochman, the heiress of Wilkowice.
- Kazimierz Ścibor-Bogusławski (1887-1949) - social activist, member of the Management Board of the Association of Polish Merchants and Christian Industrialists, director of the Cooperative Bank in Łódź, decorated with the Silver Cross of Merit. He was the son of Ignacy Henryk and Teodosia Madler.
- Stanisław Ścibor-Bogusławski (1888-1940) - officer of the 1st Infantry Regiment of the Polish Legions, major of the Polish Army, murdered in Ukraine in 1940. He was the son of Henryk and Emilia née Pszczółkowski. Decorated with the Cross of Independence and the Cross of Valor.
- Stefan Ścibor-Bogusławski (1897-1978) - captain of the Polish Army of the Second Republic of Poland and the Polish Armed Forces, participant in World War I and II, heir of Wilkowice, repeatedly decorated, among others: Knight's Cross of the Order of Polonia Restituta, Cross of Valor, Silver Cross of Merit, Commemorative Cross Monte Cassino, Star for the War of 1939-1945, Star of Italy, Medal of King George VI for the War of 1939-1945. He was the son of Stanisław Juliusz and Anna Lochman.
- Tadeusz Józefat Ścibor-Bogusławski (1899-1992) - lieutenant of the Polish Army, decorated with the Cross of Valor, heir of Wilkowice. He was the son of Stanisław Juliusz and Anna Lochman.
- Władysław Ścibor-Bogusławski (1902–1945) – participant in the Warsaw Uprising (aka "Łajdus"), decorated with the Home Army Cross, Medal of the Polish Army (four times), the Warsaw Uprising Cross, heir of Wilkowice. He was the son of Stanisław Juliusz and Anna Lochman.
- Lech Ścibor-Bogusławski (1922–2013) - participant in the September 1939 campaign, secretary general of the Association of Polish Papermakers in 1974-1982, decorated with the Golden and Silver Cross of Merit, Knight's Cross of the Order of Polonia Restituta, Medal for Warsaw, Gold and Silver Badge of Honor NOT. He was the son of Kazimierz and Stanisława née Cygański, Prussian coat of arms.
- Janusz Ścibor-Bogusławski (born 1925) – doctor of technical sciences, director of the Central Laboratory of Wool Industry in Łódź in 1973, decorated with the Golden Cross of Merit, Golden Badge of NOT and SWP, Honorary Badge of the City of Łódź and Bielsko Province.
- Rafał Ścibor-Bogusławski (born 1967) – visual artist, designer of industrial forms, journalist, president of the Ostoja Family Association, member of the editorial board of "Na Sieradzkich Szlakach", member of the Wieluń Scientific Society, awarded many times, incl. 1st prize for the design of the Polish Radio Katowice logo, 2nd prize at the International WRO Festival, Medal of the Board of the Polish Tourist and Sightseeing Society for Help and Cooperation.

== See also ==
- Ostoja CoA
- Clan Ostoja (Moscics)

== Bibliography ==
- A. Boniecki, Herbarz polski, Warszawa 1889-1913, t. I, s. 349-350, t. X, s. 18.
- K. Niesiecki, Herbarz polski, wyd. J.N. Bobrowicz, Lipsk 1839-1845.
- S. Uruski, Rodzina. Herbarz szlachty polskiej, Warszawa 1904-1931, t. I, s. 278-279.
- PAN, Biblioteka Kórnicka, Teki Dworzaczka - materiały historyczno-genealogiczne do dziejów szlachty wielkopolskiej XV-XX w.
- R. Hube, Zbiór rot przysiąg sądowych poznańskich, kościańskich, kaliskich, sieradzkich, piotrkowskich i dobrzyszyckich, Biblioteka Umiejętności Prawnych, Warszawa 1888.
- A. Gieysztor, Fragmenty zapisek heraldycznych piotrkowskich i radomskich wojew. sieradzkiego XIV i XV w.
- E. Sęczys, Szlachta wylegitymowana w Królestwie Polskim w latach 1836-1861, Warszawa 2000, s. 38.
- R. Bogusławski, Ścibor-Bogusławscy herbu Ostoja. Linia szadkowska od XVII do XX wieku, WTN, Wieluń 2020.
- R. Bogusławski, Dobra ziemskie Ścibor-Bogusławskich w Ziemi Sieradzkiej XV - XX w., [w:] "Na Sieradzkich Szlakach", 4/2007.
- R. Bogusławski, Właściciele Bogusławic w Ziemi Sieradzkiej w XV i XVI wieku, [w:] "Na Sieradzkich Szlakach", nr 1/2014.
- H. Górny, Imię Cz(ś)cibor w polskiej antroponimii i toponimii, Instytut Języka Polskiego PAN, [w:] "Onomastica", LXI/2, 2017, s. 129-141.
