= Bogusławski =

Bogusławski (feminine: Bogusławska) is a Polish toponymic surname associated with any of places named Bogusław or Bogusławice. Russian equivalent: Boguslavsky, Ukrainian: Bohuslavsky. Notable people with this surname include:

- Andrzej Bogusławski (born 1931), Polish linguist
- Andrzej Ścibor-Bogusławski (died 1729), Polish nobleman
- Heinrich Georg von Boguslawski (1827–1884), German hydrographer
- Krystyna Ścibor-Bogusławska (died 1783), Polish politician
- Łukasz Bogusławski (born 1993), Polish footballer
- Marceli Bogusławski, Polish cyclist
- Marcin Bogusławski (born 1980), Polish artist
- Moissaye Boguslawski (1887–1944), American pianist and composer
- Palm Heinrich Ludwig von Boguslawski (1789–1851), German astronomy professor
- Teresa Bogusławska (1929–1945), Polish poet
- Wojciech Bogusławski (1757–1829), Polish actor, director, and playwright
