= Boguslavsky =

Boguslavsky (feminine:Boguslavskaya) is a Russian surname, an equivalent of Polish Bogusławski. It may also be a rendering of the Ukrainian form Bohuslavsky / Bohuslavska. Notable people with this surname include:

- David Boguslavsky, the namesake of the historical Boguslavsky Triple-Deckers buildings
- Irek Boguslavsky (born 1967), Russian politician
- Kseniya Boguslavskaya (1892–1972), Russian avant-garde artist
- Leonid Boguslavsky – Canadian entrepreneur
- Liudmyla Bohuslavska (born 1955), Ukrainian artist of decorative and applied arts
- Mikhail Boguslavsky – Ukrainian-Russian revolutionary and Soviet politician
- Mykola Bohuslavsky (1850–1933), Ukrainian musician
- Zoya Boguslavskaya (1924–2026), Soviet and Russian poet and writer
