= Sędzice =

Sędzice may refer to the following places in Poland:

- Sędzice, Lower Silesian Voivodeship (south-west Poland)
- Sędzice, Łódź Voivodeship (central Poland)
- Sędzice, Warmian-Masurian Voivodeship (north Poland)
