= Ścibor =

Ścibor is a Polish surname. Notable people with this surname include:

- Aleksander Ścibor-Rylski (1928–1983), Polish filmmaker
- Andrzej Ścibor-Bogusławski (died 1729), Polish nobleman
- Ignacy Ścibor Marchocki (1755–1827), Polish nobleman
- Krystyna Ścibor-Bogusławska (died 1783), Polish politician
- Zbigniew Ścibor-Rylski (1917–2018), Polish general

== See also ==
- Ctibor (name), Czech and Slovak form of the name Ścibor
