= Rowy =

Rowy may refer to the following places in Poland:

- Rowy, Łódź Voivodeship (central Poland)
- Rowy, Pomeranian Voivodeship (north Poland)
- Rowy, Podlaskie Voivodeship (north-east Poland)
- Rowy, Garwolin County in Masovian Voivodeship (east-central Poland)
- Rowy, Pułtusk County in Masovian Voivodeship (east-central Poland)
- Rowy, Warmian-Masurian Voivodeship (north Poland)

== See also ==
- Siemień-Rowy
