= Otto Krümmel =

German geographer

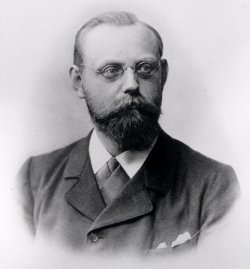
Otto Krümmel

Otto Krümmel (8 July 1854 – 12 October 1912) was a German geographer influential in awakening public interest in oceanography.

== Biography ==
He was born in Exin, Province of Posen, and was educated principally at the University of Göttingen, where he was a student of Johann Eduard Wappäus and Karl von Seebach. He approached the subject of geography at first through the study of classics and history. In 1882/83 he was associated with the German Naval Observatory in Hamburg, and in 1883, became an associate professor of geography at the University of Kiel (full professor in 1884, rector 1897/98). In that seaport he found the connection of his subject with marine investigations which directed his subsequent career.

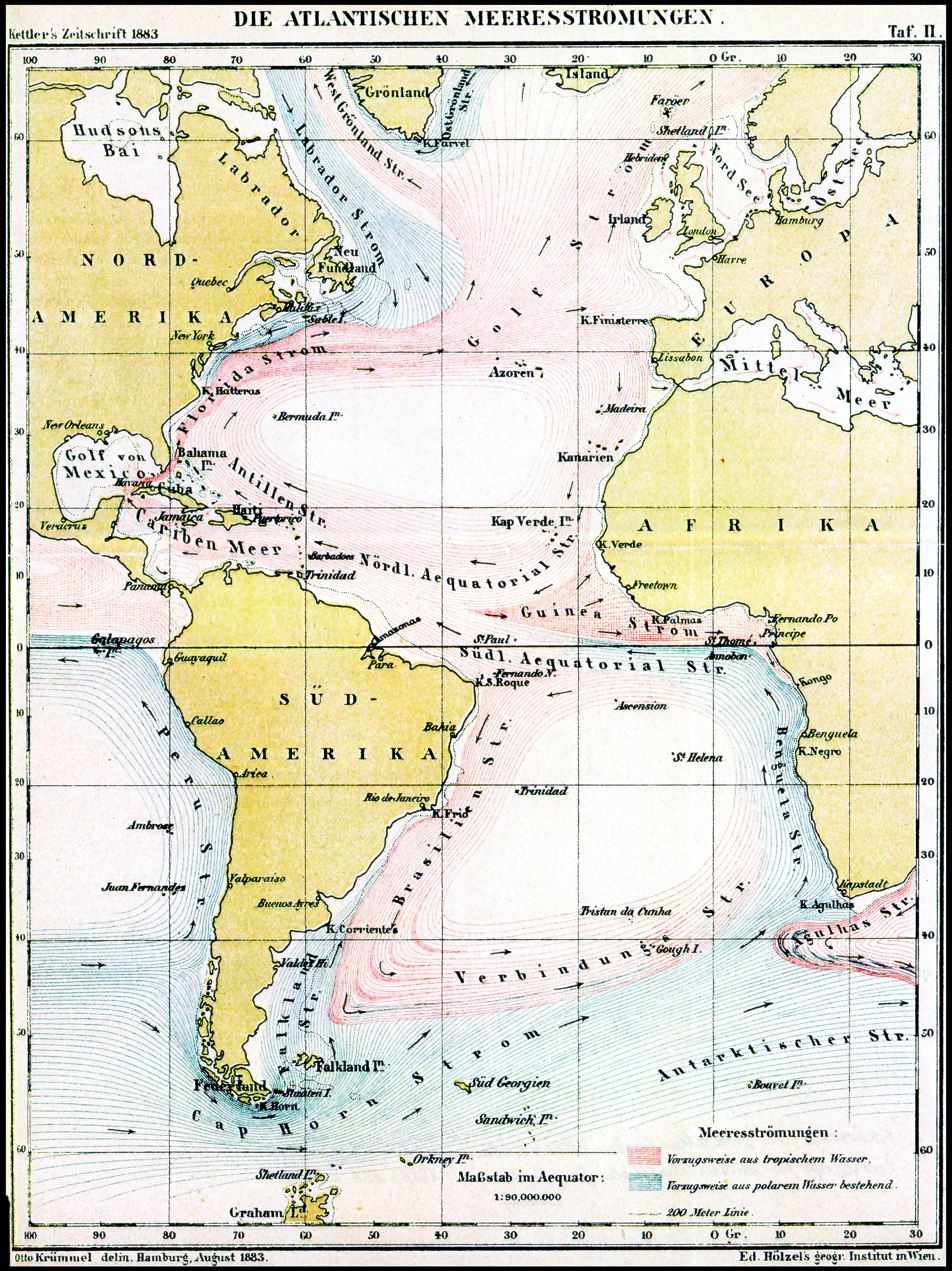
Otto Krümmel's map of Atlantic ocean currents (1883)

He remained at Kiel until 1911, and during his tenure of it he introduced the science of oceanography to public interest through his handbook Der Ozean (1886), completed Heinrich Georg von Boguslawski's work on oceanography in Friedrich Ratzel's series of geographical handbooks (1887), joined, and published an account of, the “Plankton Expedition” on board the National in the North Atlantic Ocean (1889), served on the International Council for the Study of the Sea (1900-9), and finally produced the great work of his life, the Handbuch der Ozeanographie, in 1907-11.

In 1911, Krümmel left Kiel to take up the professorship of geography at the University of Marburg as the successor of Theobald Fischer. He died in Cologne.
