= Wróblew, Sieradz County =

Wróblew
- Village
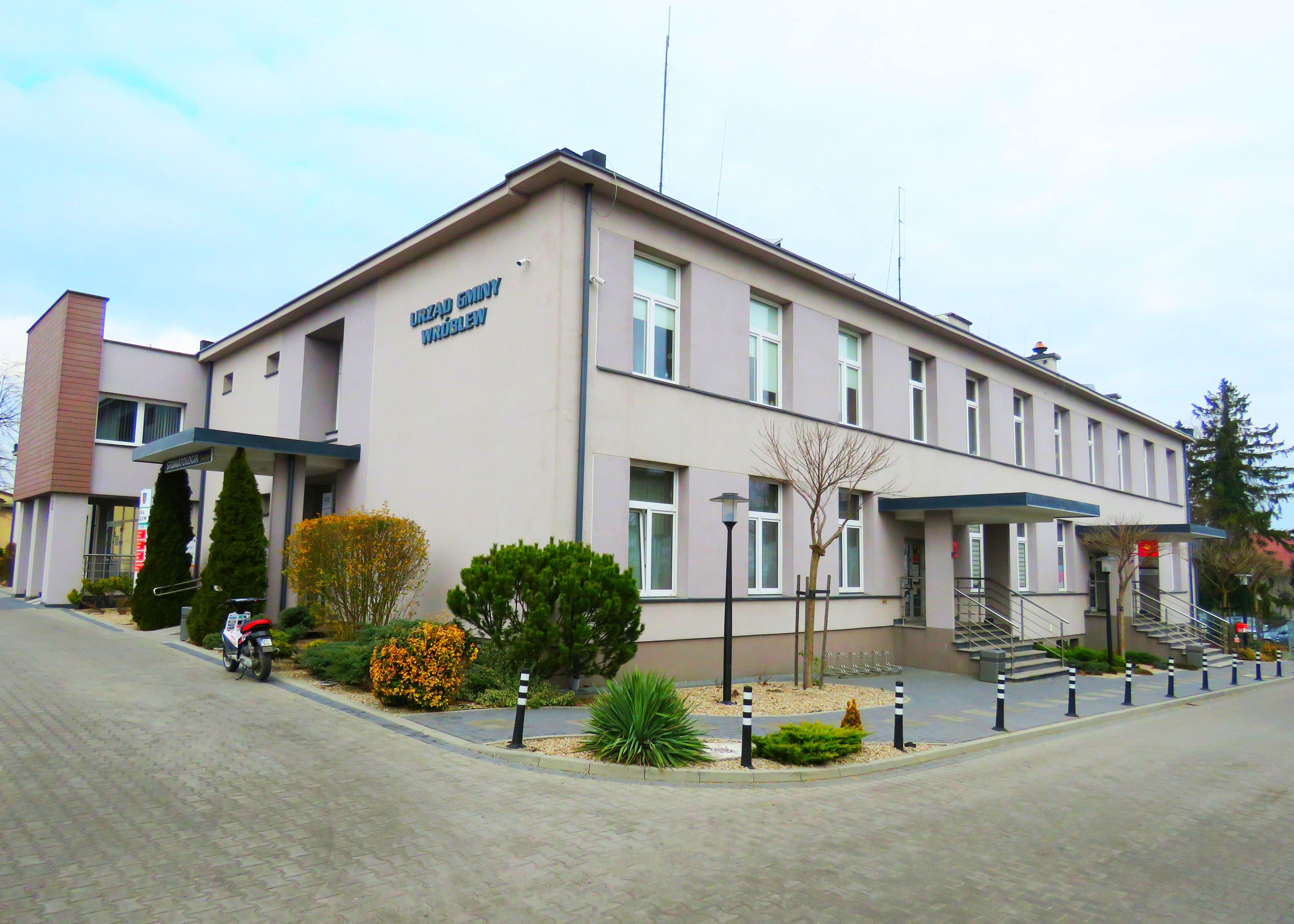
- Gmina office in Wróblew

- Location within Poland
- Coordinates: 51°36′38″N 18°36′58″E
- Country: Poland
- Voivodeship: Łódź
- County: Sieradz
- Gmina: Wróblew

Population
  - Total: 340
- Time zone: UTC+1 (CET)
  - Summer (DST): UTC+2 (CEST)
- Vehicle registration: ESI

Wróblew [ˈvrublɛf] is a village in Sieradz County, Łódź Voivodeship, in central Poland. It is the seat of the gmina (administrative district) called Gmina Wróblew.
