= Dąbrówka, Gmina Wróblew =

Village in Gmina Wróblew, Poland

Dąbrówka
- Village
- Location within Poland
- Coordinates: 51°35′54″N 18°35′46″E
- Country: Poland
- Voivodeship: Łódź
- County: Sieradz
- Gmina: Wróblew

Dąbrówka [dɔmˈbrufka] is a village in the administrative district of Gmina Wróblew, within Sieradz County, Łódź Voivodeship, in central Poland.
