= Ocin =

- Village
- Location within Poland
- Coordinates: 51°37′N 18°38′E
- Country: Poland
- Voivodeship: Łódź
- County: Sieradz
- Gmina: Wróblew

Ocin [ˈɔt͡ɕin] is a village in the administrative district of Gmina Wróblew, within Sieradz County, Łódź Voivodeship, in central Poland.
