= Józefów, Sieradz County =

Józefów
- Village
- Location within Poland
- Coordinates: 51°32′54″N 18°37′51″E
- Country: Poland
- Voivodeship: Łódź
- County: Sieradz
- Gmina: Wróblew

Józefów (Polish pronunciation: [juˈzɛfuf]) is a village in the administrative district of Gmina Wróblew, within Sieradz County, Łódź Voivodeship, in central Poland.
