= Gmina Wróblew =

Gmina Wróblew Wróblew Commune
- Gmina

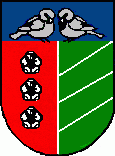
- Coat of arms
- Interactive map of Gmina Wróblew
- Coordinates (Wróblew): 51°36′38″N 18°36′58″E
- Country: Poland
- Voivodeship: Łódź
- County: Sieradz
- Seat: Wróblew

Area
  - Total: 113.23 km^{2} (43.72 sq mi)

Population (2006)
  - Total: 6,244
  - Density: 55.14/km^{2} (142.8/sq mi)
- Car plates: ESI
- Website: wroblew.pl/index.php

Gmina Wróblew is a rural gmina (administrative district) in Sieradz County, Łódź Voivodeship, in central Poland. Its seat is the village of Wróblew, which lies approximately 10 kilometres (6 mi) west of Sieradz and 62 km (39 mi) west of the regional capital Łódź.

The gmina covers an area of 113.23 square kilometres (43.7 sq mi), and as of 2006 its total population is 6,244.

== Villages ==
Gmina Wróblew contains the villages and settlements of:

- Bliźniew
- Charłupia Wielka
- Dąbrówka
- Drzązna
- Dziebędów
- Gęsówka
- Inczew
- Józefów
- Kobierzycko
- Kościerzyn
- Ocin
- Oraczew Mały
- Oraczew Wielki
- Próchna
- Rakowice
- Rowy
- Sadokrzyce
- Sędzice
- Słomków Mokry
- Słomków Suchy
- Smardzew
- Tubądzin
- Tworkowizna Rowska
- Wągłczew
- Wróblew

== Neighbouring gminas ==
Gmina Wróblew is bordered by the town of Sieradz and by the gminas of Błaszki, Brąszewice, Brzeźnio, Sieradz and Warta.
