= Bogusław =

Bogusław may refer to:

- Bogusław (given name)
- Bogusław, West Pomeranian Voivodeship
- Bogusław, Lublin Voivodeship

== See also ==
- Bogusławski (disambiguation)
- Bohuslav, a city in Kyiv Oblast, Ukraine, known among Russophones as Boguslav
