= Dziebędów =

- Village
- Location within Poland
- Coordinates: 51°38′N 18°32′E
- Country: Poland
- Voivodeship: Łódź
- County: Sieradz
- Gmina: Wróblew

Dziebędów [d͡ʑɛˈbɛnduf] is a village in the administrative district of Gmina Wróblew, within Sieradz County, Łódź Voivodeship, in central Poland.
