= Drzązna =

- Village
- Location within Poland
- Coordinates: 51°34′N 18°39′E
- Country: Poland
- Voivodeship: Łódź
- County: Sieradz
- Gmina: Wróblew

Drzązna [ˈdʐɔ̃zna] is a village in the administrative district of Gmina Wróblew, within Sieradz County, Łódź Voivodeship, in central Poland.
