= Charłupia Wielka =

- Village
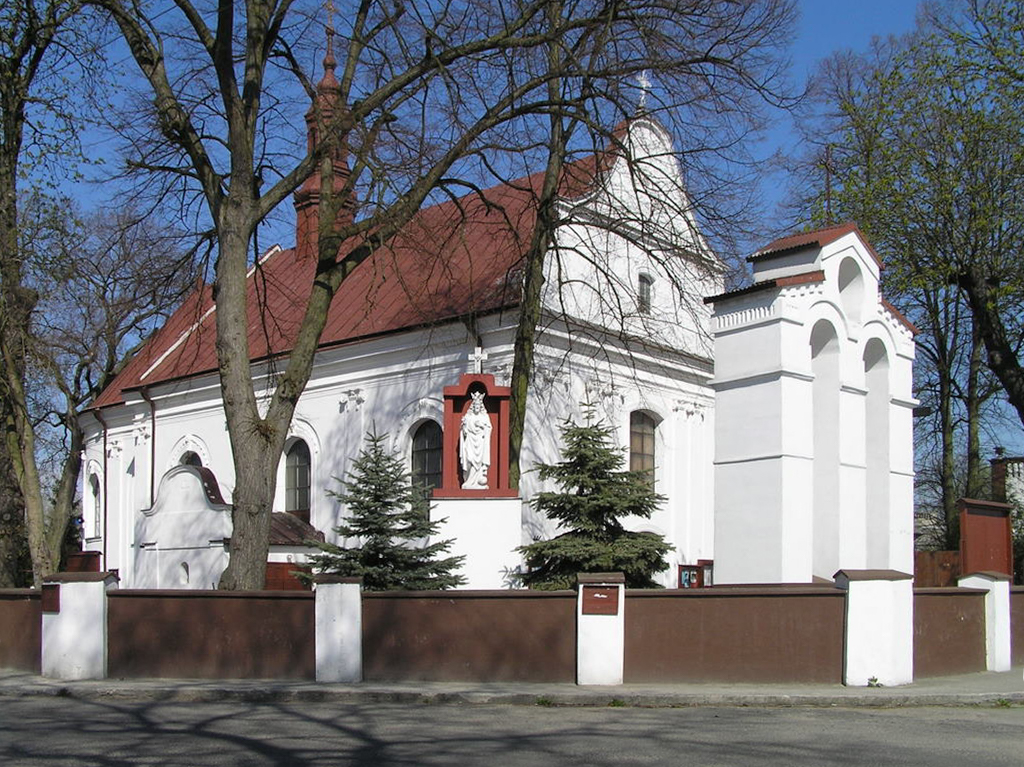
- Saint Bartholomew church in Charłupia Wielka

- Location within Poland
- Coordinates: 51°34′N 18°38′E
- Country: Poland
- Voivodeship: Łódź
- County: Sieradz
- Gmina: Wróblew

Population
  - Total: 400
- Time zone: UTC+1 (CET)
  - Summer (DST): UTC+2 (CEST)
- Vehicle registration: ESI

Charłupia Wielka [xarˈwupja ˈvjɛlka] is a village in the administrative district of Gmina Wróblew, within Sieradz County, Łódź Voivodeship, in central Poland.

Local landmarks are the Baroque Saint Bartholomew church and the manor of Polish writer Władysław Reymont.
