= Kościerzyn =

- Village
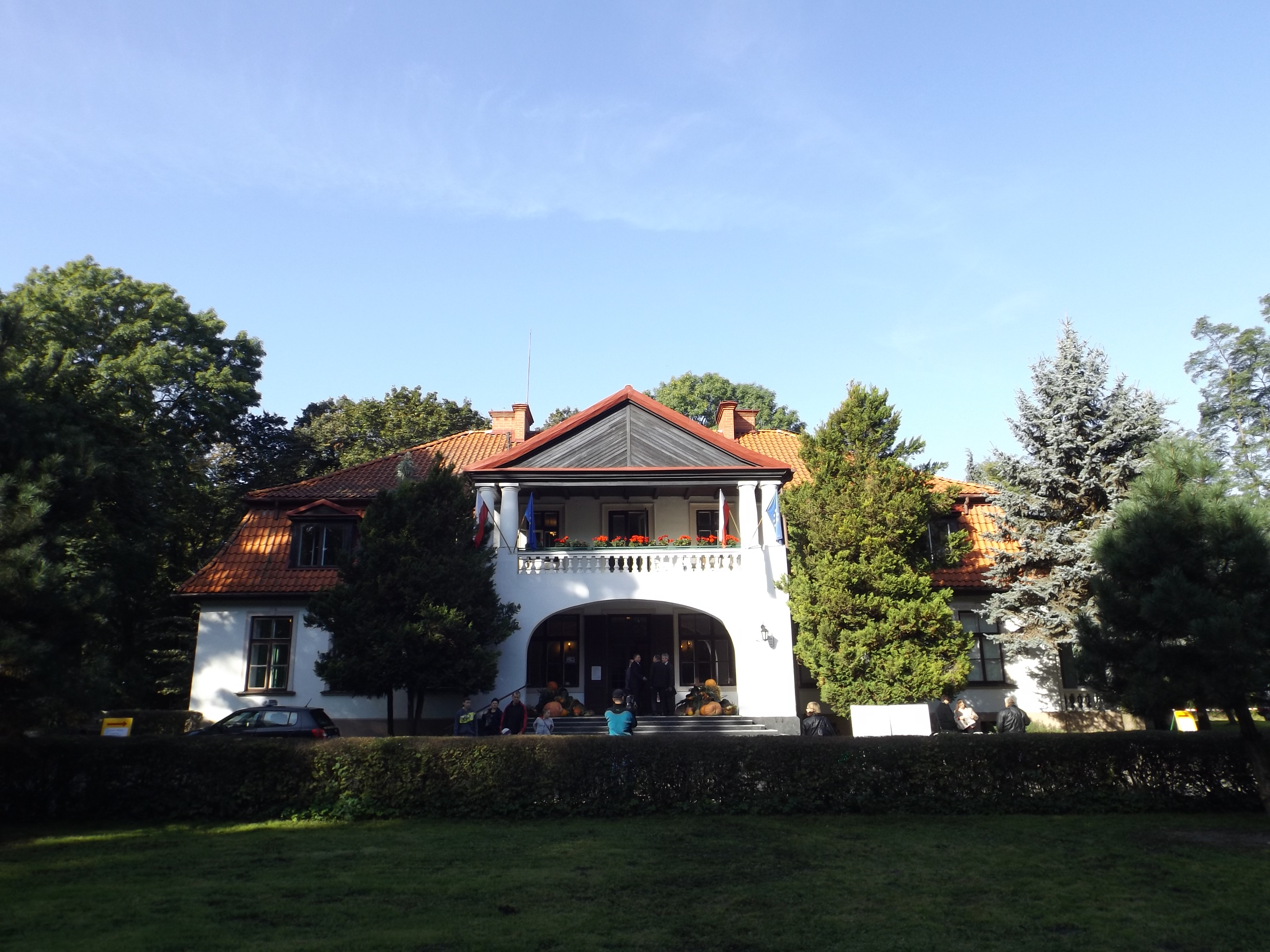
- Manor

- Location within Poland
- Coordinates: 51°38′N 18°39′E
- Country: Poland
- Voivodeship: Łódź
- County: Sieradz
- Gmina: Wróblew
- Population: 400

Kościerzyn (Polish pronunciation: [kɔɕˈtɕɛʐɨn]) is a village in the administrative district of Gmina Wróblew, within Sieradz County, Łódź Voivodeship, in central Poland.
