= Gęsówka =

- Village
- Location within Poland
- Coordinates: 51°33′3″N 18°35′43″E
- Country: Poland
- Voivodeship: Łódź
- County: Sieradz
- Gmina: Wróblew

Gęsówka [ɡɛ̃ˈsufka] is a village in the administrative district of Gmina Wróblew, within Sieradz County, Łódź Voivodeship, in central Poland.
