= Tubądzin =

- Village
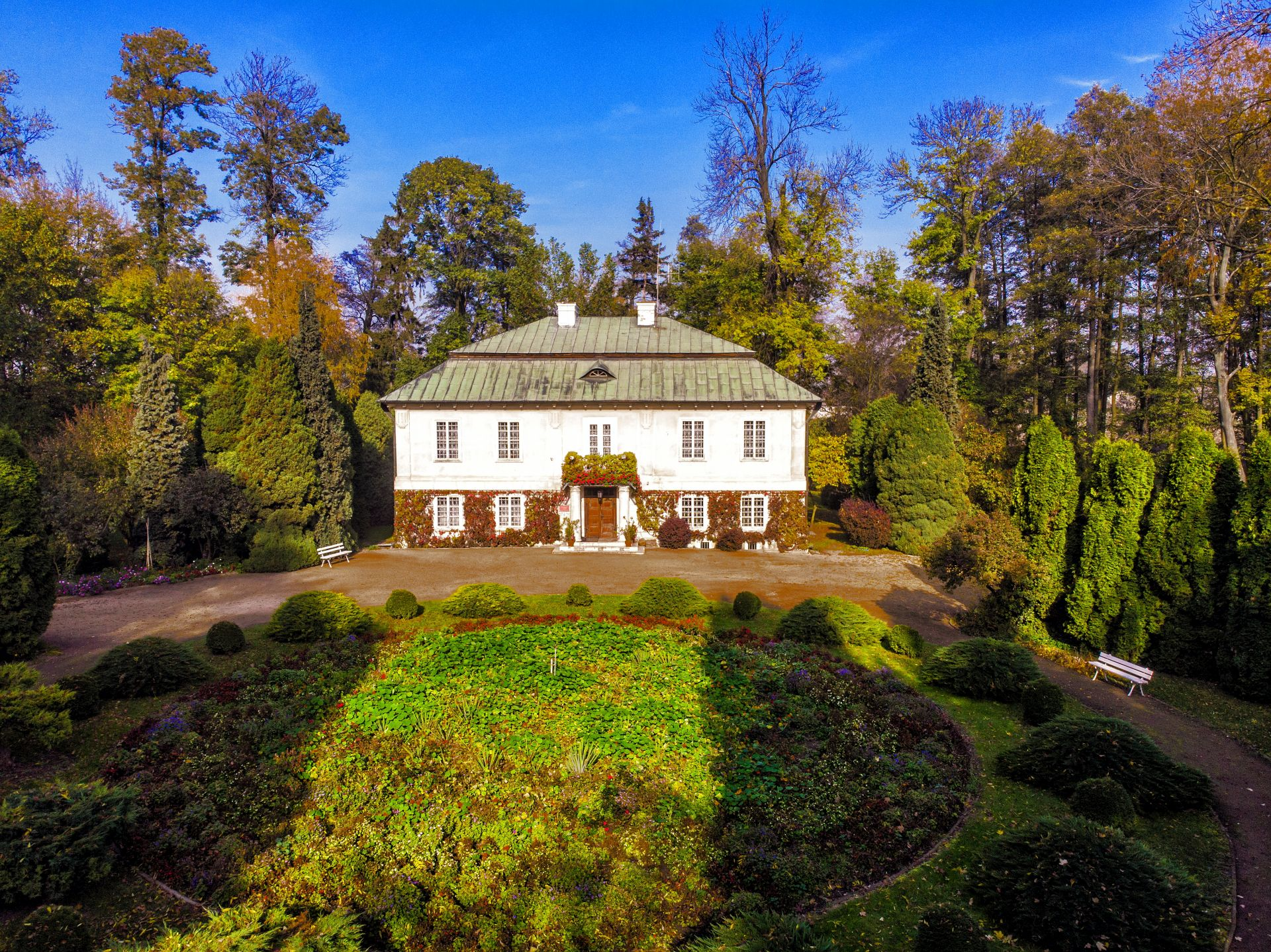
- Walewski Museum in Tubądzin

- Location within Poland
- Coordinates: 51°40′N 18°34′E
- Country: Poland
- Voivodeship: Łódź
- County: Sieradz
- Gmina: Wróblew

Population
  - Total: 230
- Time zone: UTC+1 (CET)
  - Summer (DST): UTC+2 (CEST)
- Vehicle registration: ESI

Tubądzin [tuˈbɔnd͡ʑin] is a village in the administrative district of Gmina Wróblew, within Sieradz County, Łódź Voivodeship, in central Poland.

The local landmark is the 18th-century manor house with an adjacent park. Built by castellan Maciej Zbijewski, the manor passed to the Walewski family in the 19th century. Kazimierz Stanisław Walewski amassed valuable paleontological, archival and art collections. The manor houses the Walewski Museum, a branch of the Regional Museum in Sieradz, featuring historic manor interiors and the Walewskis' collection.

== History ==
During the German occupation of Poland in World War II, in 1940, the German gendarmerie carried out expulsions of Poles, who were first sent to a transit camp in Konstantynów Łódzki and then deported to the Kraków District in the southeastern part of German-occupied Poland. The German occupiers either destroyed or looted a portion of the collection of the Walewski family, and the manor was occupied by German colonists.
