= Kobierzycko =

- Village
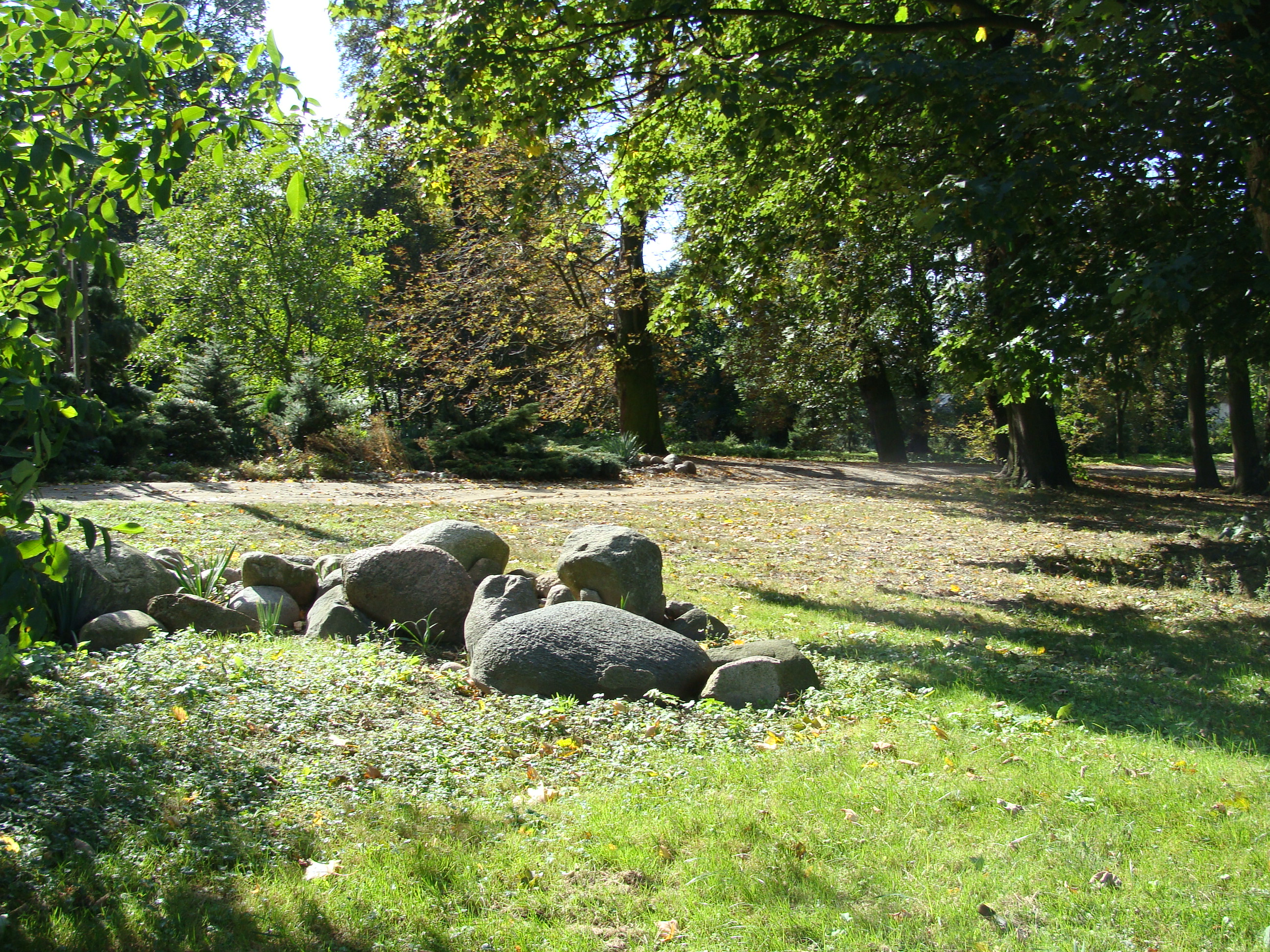
- Park

- Location within Poland
- Coordinates: 51°37′22″N 18°35′59″E
- Country: Poland
- Voivodeship: Łódź
- County: Sieradz
- Gmina: Wróblew

Kobierzycko [kɔbjɛˈʐɨt͡skɔ] is a village in the administrative district of Gmina Wróblew, within Sieradz County, Łódź Voivodeship, in central Poland.
