= Inczew =

- Village
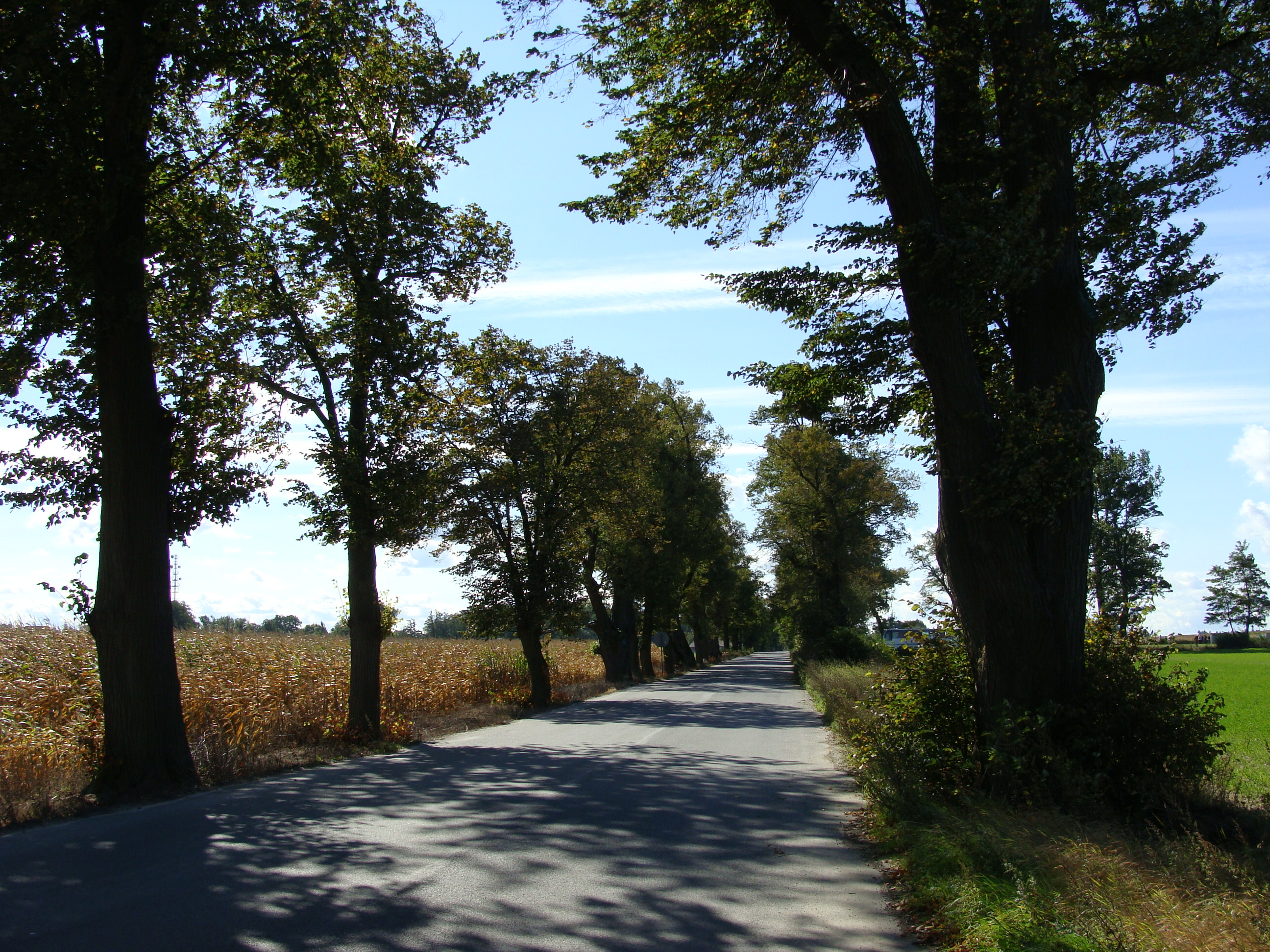

- Location within Poland
- Coordinates: 51°39′N 18°34′E
- Country: Poland
- Voivodeship: Łódź
- County: Sieradz
- Gmina: Wróblew

Inczew [ˈint͡ʂɛf] is a village in the administrative district of Gmina Wróblew, within Sieradz County, Łódź Voivodeship, in central Poland.
