= Tworkowizna Rowska =

- Village
- Location within Poland
- Coordinates: 51°33′39″N 18°35′58″E
- Country: Poland
- Voivodeship: Łódź
- County: Sieradz
- Gmina: Wróblew

Tworkowizna Rowska [tfɔrkɔˈvizna ˈrɔfska] is a village in the administrative district of Gmina Wróblew, within Sieradz County, Łódź Voivodeship, in central Poland.
