= Oraczew Mały =

- Village
- Location within Poland
- Coordinates: 51°34′3″N 18°35′9″E
- Country: Poland
- Voivodeship: Łódź
- County: Sieradz
- Gmina: Wróblew
- Population: 90

Oraczew Mały [ɔˈrat͡ʂɛf ˈmawɨ] is a village in the administrative district of Gmina Wróblew, within Sieradz County, Łódź Voivodeship, in central Poland.
