= Rakowice, Łódź Voivodeship =

Rakowice
- Village
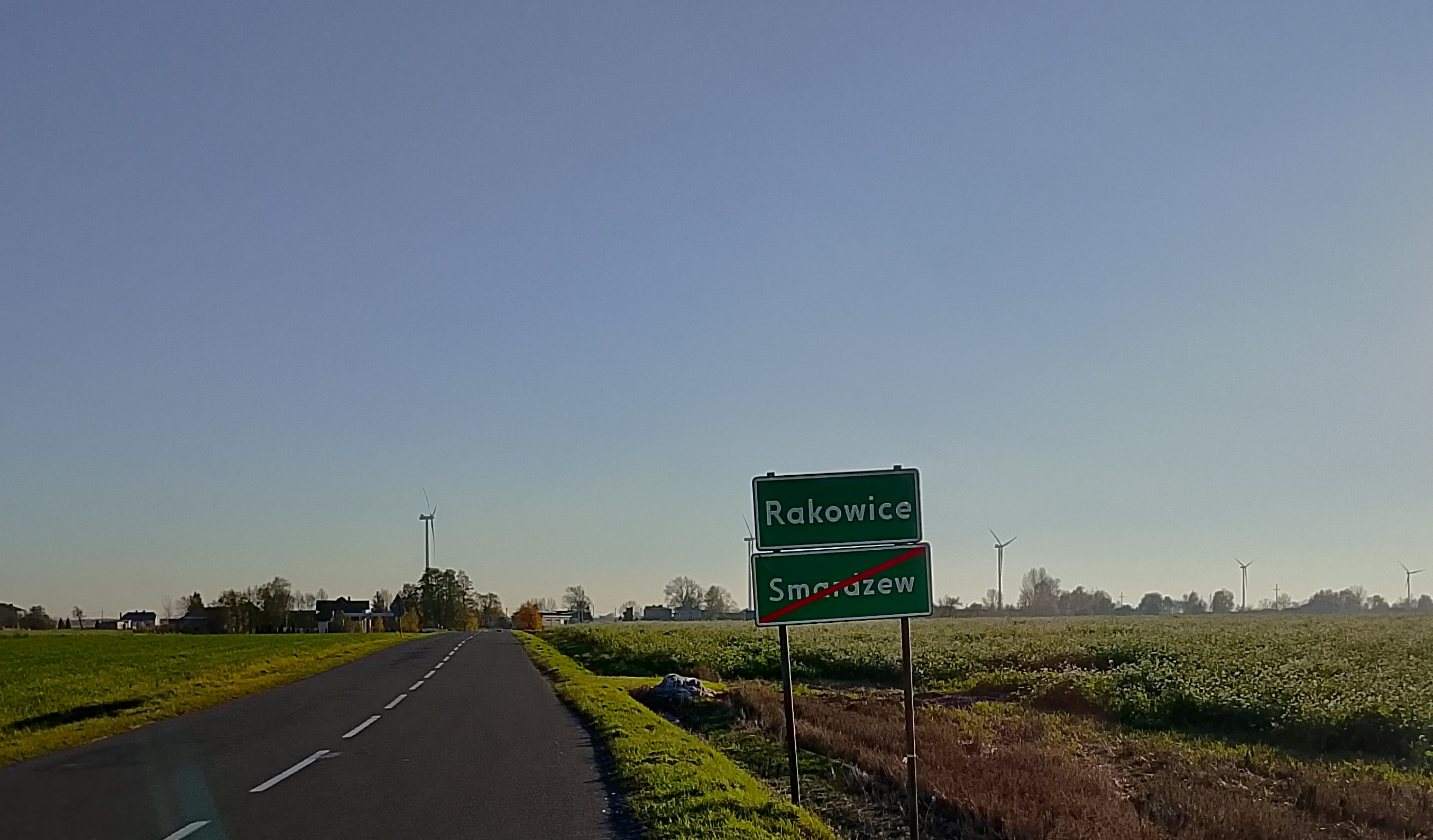
- Entrance sign

- Location within Poland
- Coordinates: 51°35′12″N 18°37′53″E
- Country: Poland
- Voivodeship: Łódź
- County: Sieradz
- Gmina: Wróblew
- Time zone: UTC+1 (CET)
  - Summer (DST): UTC+2 (CEST)
- Vehicle registration: ESI

Rakowice [rakɔˈvit͡sɛ] is a village in the administrative district of Gmina Wróblew, within Sieradz County, Łódź Voivodeship, in central Poland.
