= Smardzew, Sieradz County =

Smardzew
- Village
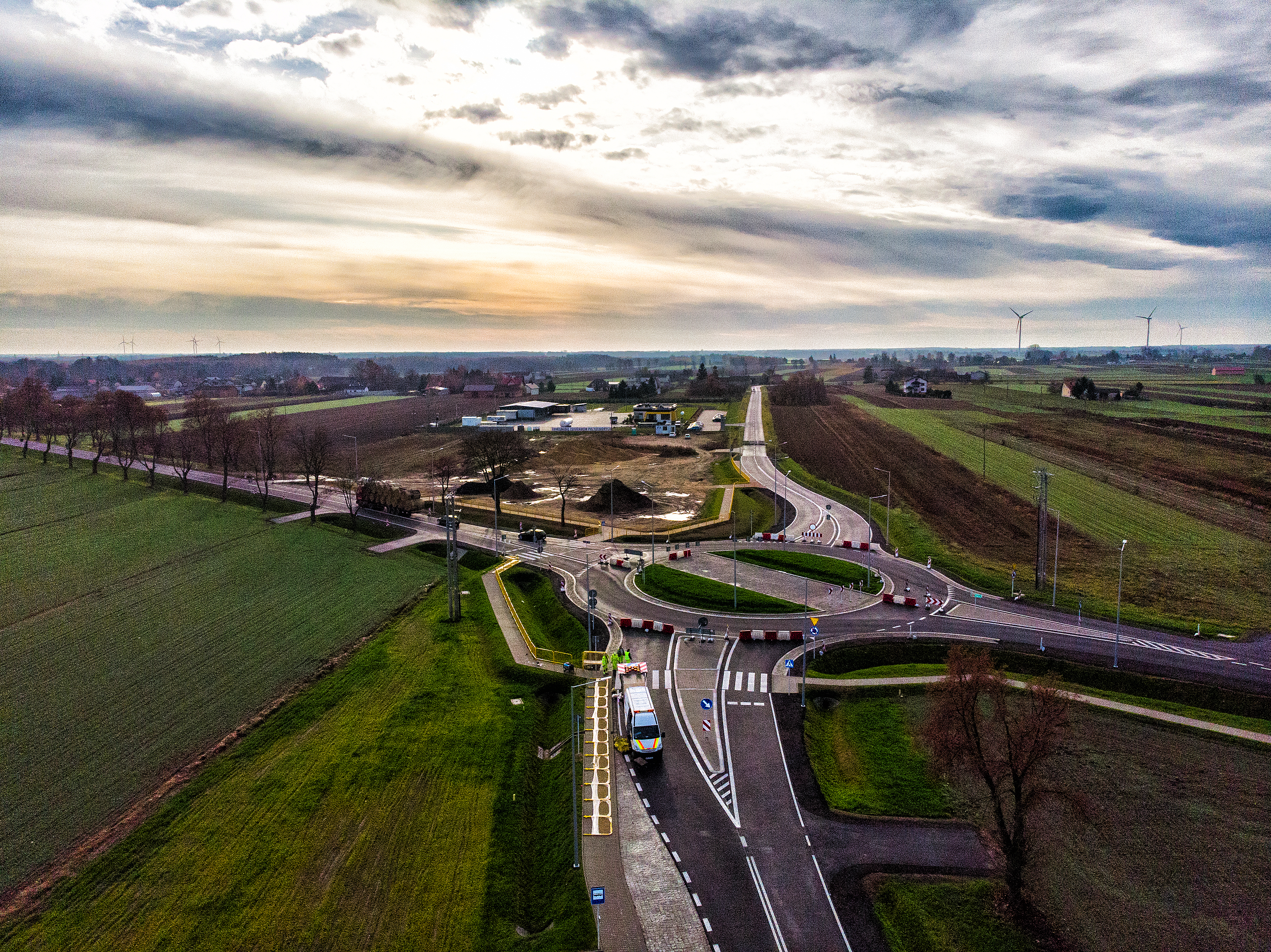

- Location within Poland
- Coordinates: 51°35′53″N 18°38′52″E
- Country: Poland
- Voivodeship: Łódź
- County: Sieradz
- Gmina: Wróblew

Smardzew [ˈsmard͡zɛf] is a village in the administrative district of Gmina Wróblew, within Sieradz County, Łódź Voivodeship, in central Poland.
