= Heinrich Georg von Boguslawski =

German hydrographer and oceanographer

Heinrich Georg von Boguslawski (7 December 1827 in Groß-Rake, near Breslau – 4 May 1884 in Berlin) was a German hydrographer and oceanographer. He was the son of astronomer Palm Heinrich Ludwig von Boguslawski (1789–1851).

He studied natural sciences at the University of Breslau, and for many years worked as a schoolteacher in Berlin, Anklam and Stettin. In 1874 he was named section-chief in the hydrographic office of the Admiralty in Berlin. He was an editor of Annalen der Hydrographie und maritimen Meteorologie ("Annals of Hydrographic and Marine Meteorology", 1875–84) and the Nachrichten für Seefahrer ("Notice to Mariners", 1874–84).

With geographer Otto Krümmel, he was co-author of the two-volume Handbuch der Ozeanographie ("Handbook of Oceanography").

- Volume 1: Räumliche, physikalische und chemische Beschaffenheit der Ozeane (by Boguslawski), 1884 – Spatial, physical and chemical nature of the oceans.
- Volume 2: Die Bewegungsformen des Meeres (by Krümmel), 1887 – The motion of the seas.

In 1878 he published Die Tiefsee und ihre Boden- und Temperatur-Verhältnisse: Mit 1 Tiefenkarte der Oceane der Erde und 6 Diagrammen im Text (The deep sea and its soil and temperature conditions: With a depth chart of the Earth's oceans and six diagrams in the text).
