= Grzymaczew =

- Village
- Location within Poland
- Coordinates: 51°35′41″N 18°24′39″E
- Country: Poland
- Voivodeship: Łódź
- County: Sieradz
- Gmina: Błaszki

Grzymaczew [ɡʐɨˈmat͡ʂɛf] is a village in the administrative district of Gmina Błaszki, within Sieradz County, Łódź Voivodeship, in central Poland.
