= Gluzy =

- Village
- Location within Poland
- Coordinates: 50°24′2″N 20°42′52″E
- Country: Poland
- Voivodeship: Świętokrzyskie
- County: Busko
- Gmina: Wiślica

Gluzy [ˈɡluzɨ] is a village in the administrative district of Gmina Wiślica, within Busko County, Świętokrzyskie Voivodeship, in south-central Poland. It lies approximately 7 km (4 mi) north-east of Wiślica, 8 km (5 mi) south of Busko-Zdrój, and 55 km (34 mi) south of the regional capital Kielce.
