= Korczew, Zduńska Wola County =

Korczew
- Village
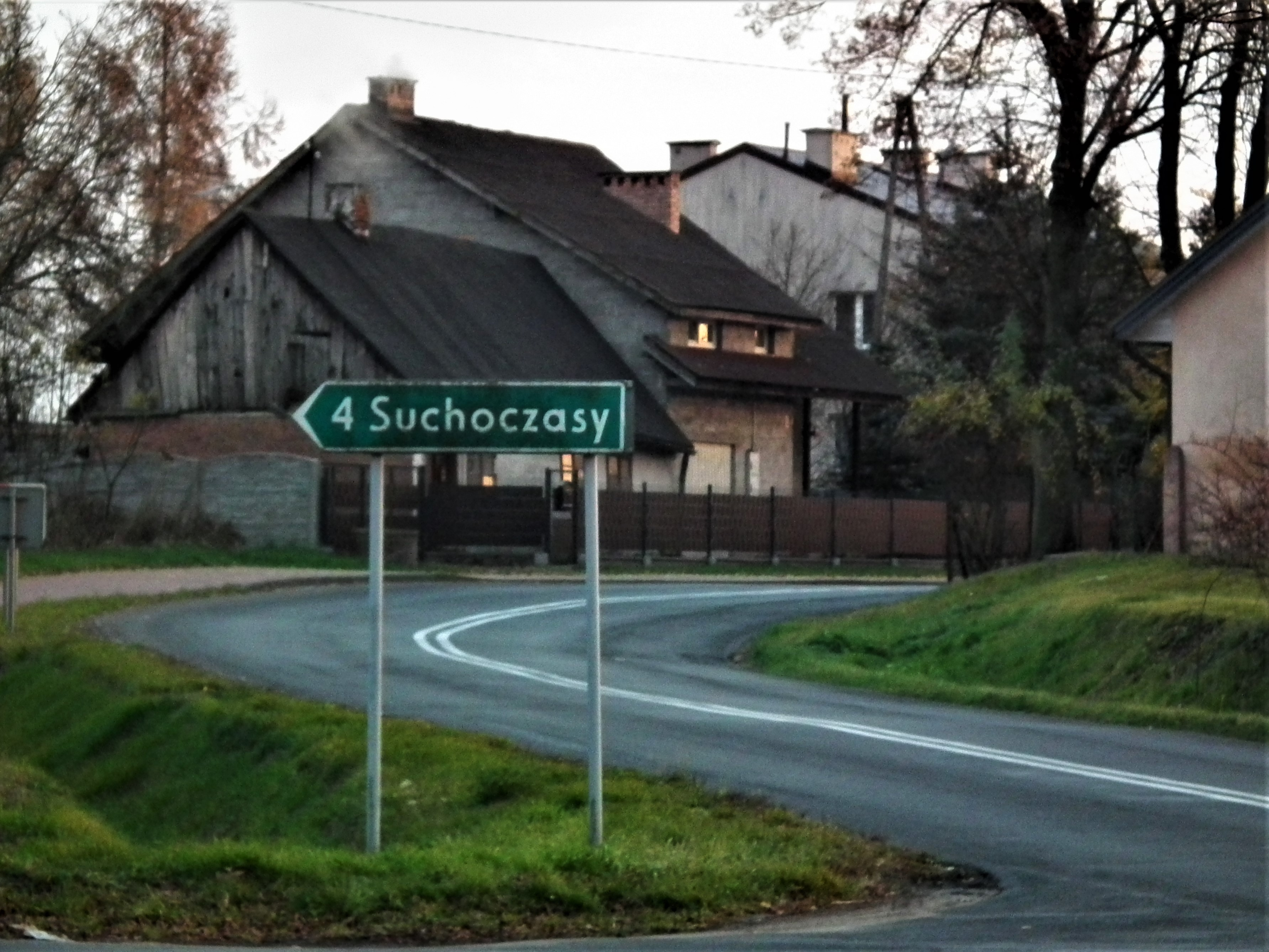

- Location within Poland
- Coordinates: 51°38′20″N 18°55′3″E
- Country: Poland
- Voivodeship: Łódź
- County: Zduńska Wola
- Gmina: Zduńska Wola

Korczew [ˈkɔrt͡ʂɛf] is a village in the administrative district of Gmina Zduńska Wola, within Zduńska Wola County, Łódź Voivodeship, in central Poland.

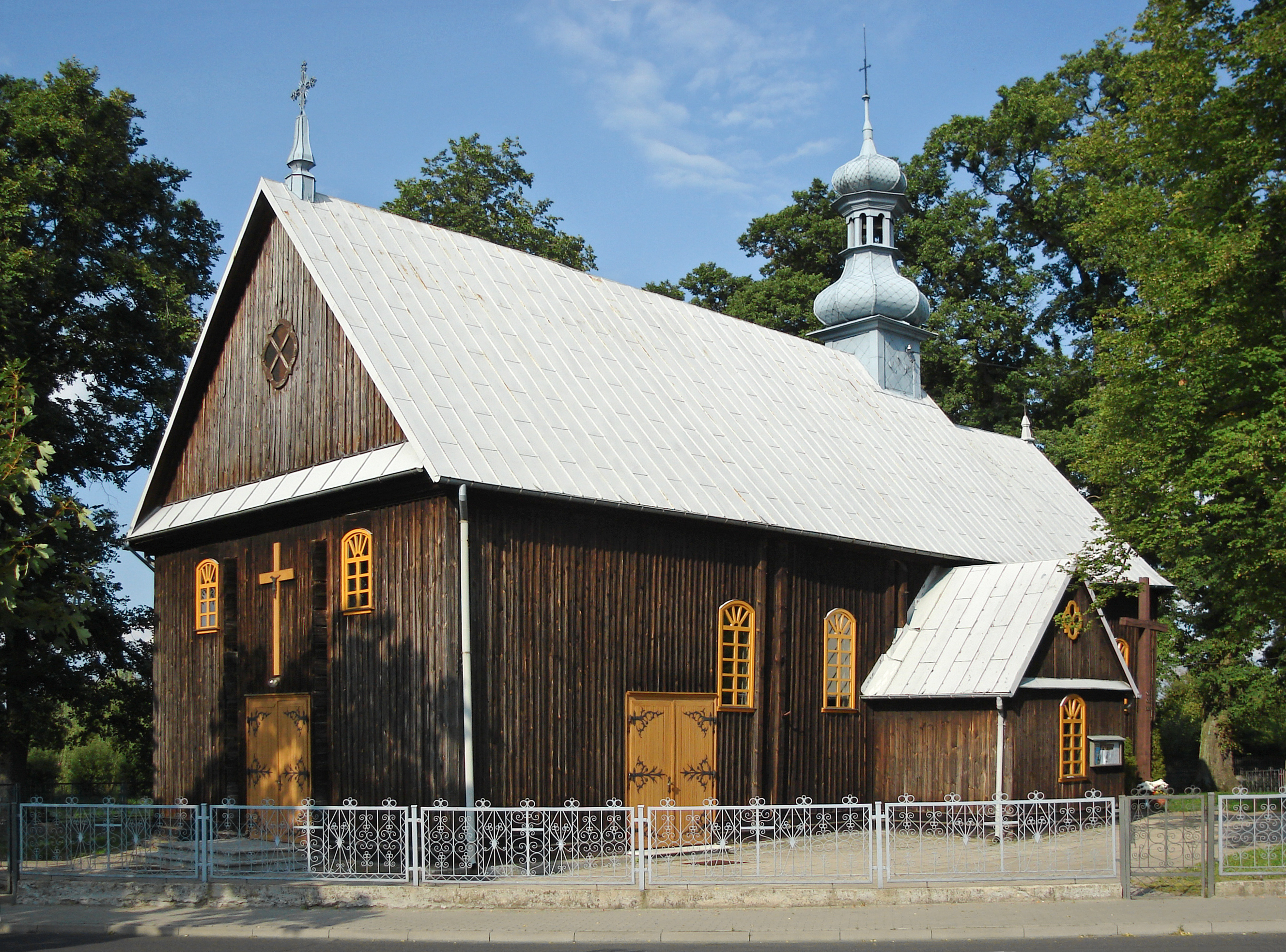
Church of St. Catherine in Korczew
