= Wilkowice, Rawa County =

Wilkowice
- Village
- Location within Poland
- Coordinates: 51°49′30″N 20°8′19″E
- Country: Poland
- Voivodeship: Łódź
- County: Rawa
- Gmina: Rawa Mazowiecka

Wilkowice [vilkɔˈvit͡sɛ] is a village in the administrative district of Gmina Rawa Mazowiecka, within Rawa County, Łódź Voivodeship, in central Poland.
