= Włocin-Wieś =

- Village
- Location within Poland
- Coordinates: 51°35′N 18°25′E
- Country: Poland
- Voivodeship: Łódź
- County: Sieradz
- Gmina: Błaszki

Włocin-Wieś [ˈvwɔt͡ɕin ˈvjɛɕ] is a village in the administrative district of Gmina Błaszki, within Sieradz County, Łódź Voivodeship, in central Poland.
