= Johann Eduard Wappäus =

German geographer (1812-1879)

Johann Eduard Wappäus (17 May 1812, Hamburg – 16 December 1879, Göttingen) was a German geographer. He was a son-in-law to mineralogist Johann Friedrich Ludwig Hausmann.

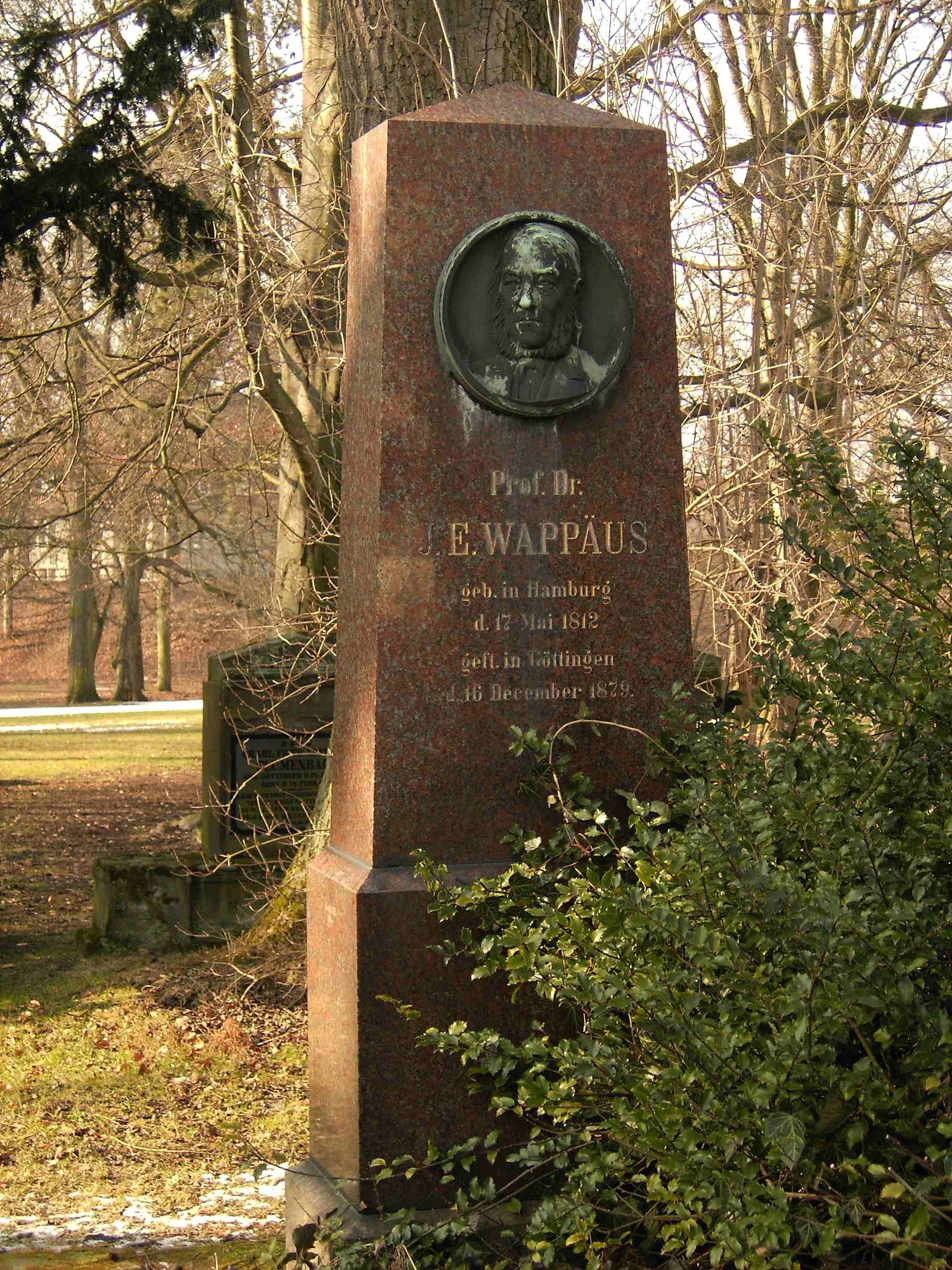
Gravesite of Wappäus at Cheltenhampark, Göttingen

He studied at the Universities of Göttingen and Berlin, where he was a student of Carl Ritter. In 1833–34 he took part in a study trip to Cape Verde and Brazil. In 1838 he qualified as a lecturer at Göttingen, where in 1845, he became an associate professor. In 1854 he was appointed professor of geography and statistics at Göttingen.

His most widely known work was a new edition of the "Stein-Hörschelmann" Handbuchs der Geographie und Statistik, of which, he published three exceptional volumes on the Americas. From 1848 to 1863, and from 1874 to 1879, he was editor of the Göttingischen Gelehrten Anzeigen.

== Selected works ==
- Untersuchungen über die geographischen Entdeckungen der Portugiesen unter Heinrich dem Seefahrer : ein Beitrag zur Geschichte des Seehandels und der Geographie im Mittelalter, 1842 – Studies on the geographical discoveries of the Portuguese under Henry the Navigator:. A contribution to the history of maritime trade and geography in the Middle Ages.
- Deutsche Auswanderung und Colonisation, 1846 – German emigration and colonization.
- Handbuch der allgemeinen Geographie und Statistik, 1855 – Textbook of general geography and statistics.
- Allgemeine Bevölkerungsstatistik. Leipzig : J.C. Hinrichs, (1859-1861, two volumes) – General population statistics.
- Handbuch der Geographie und Statistik von Ost- und Nord-Europa, 1858 – Textbook of geography and statistics of eastern and northern Europe.
- Geographie und Statistik von Mexico und Centralamerika, 1863 – Geography and statistics of Mexico and Central America.
- Patagonien, die Argentinische Republik, Uruguay und Paraguay geographisch und statistisch dargestellt, 1870 – Patagonia, the Republic of Argentina, Uruguay and Paraguay presented geographically and statistically.
- Handbuch der Geographie und Statistik des Kaiserreichs Brasilien, 1871 – Textbook of geography and statistics of the Empire of Brazil.
- Einleitung in das Studium der Statistik. Vorlesungen Gehalten an der Universität Göttingen, 1881 – Introduction to the study of statistics. Lectures held at the University of Göttingen.
