= Chrusty, Łask County =

Chrusty
- Village
- Location within Poland
- Coordinates: 51°22′34″N 18°56′24″E
- Country: Poland
- Voivodeship: Łódź
- County: Łask
- Gmina: Widawa
- Population: 175

Chrusty [ˈxrustɨ] is a village in the administrative district of Gmina Widawa, within Łask County, Łódź Voivodeship, in central Poland.
