= Sędzice, Łódź Voivodeship =

Sędzice
- Village
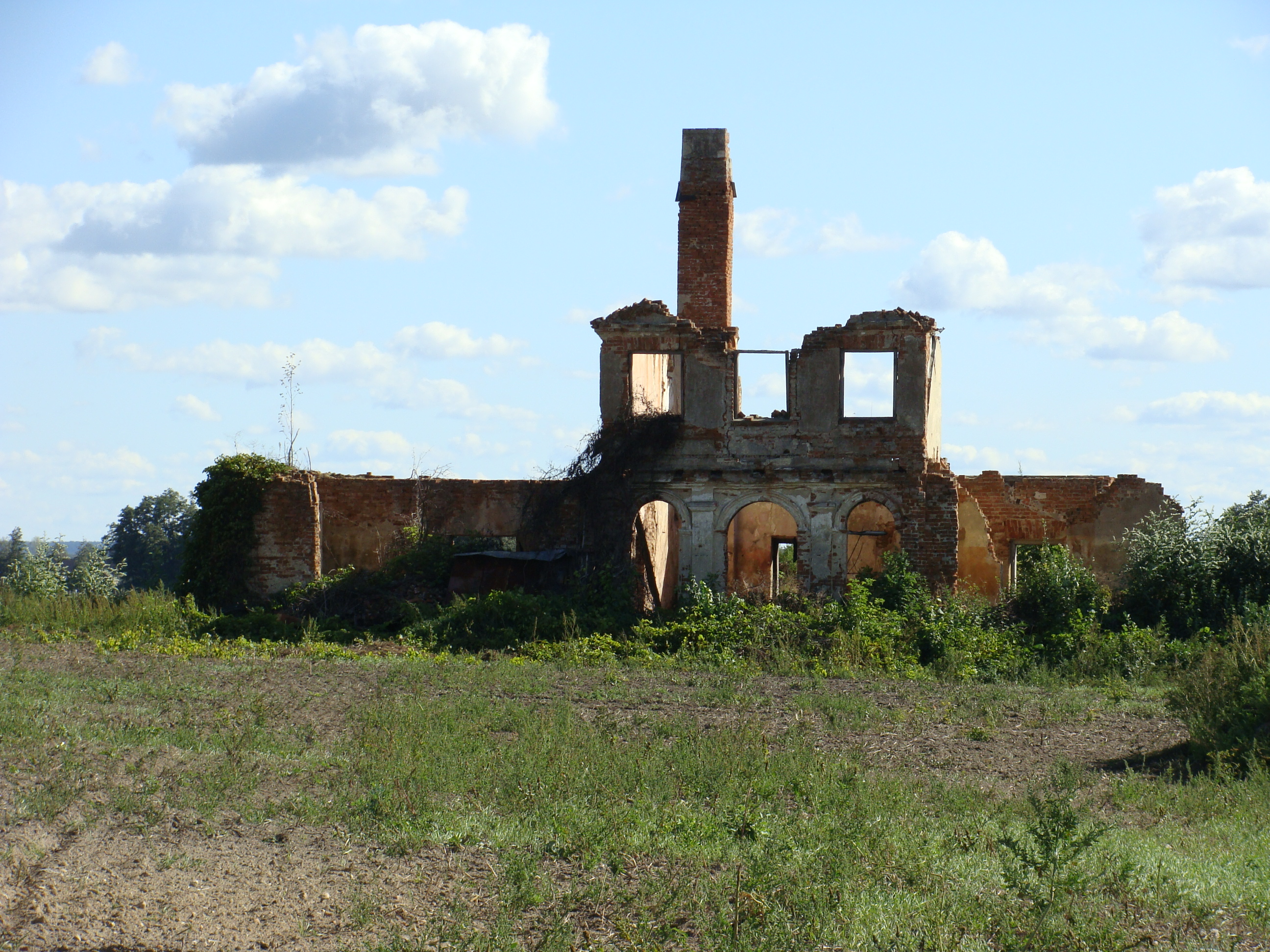
- Manor ruins

- Location within Poland
- Coordinates: 51°38′35″N 18°35′55″E
- Country: Poland
- Voivodeship: Łódź
- County: Sieradz
- Gmina: Wróblew

Sędzice [sɛnˈd͡ʑit͡sɛ] is a village in the administrative district of Gmina Wróblew, within Sieradz County, Łódź Voivodeship, in central Poland.
