= Sadokrzyce =

- Village
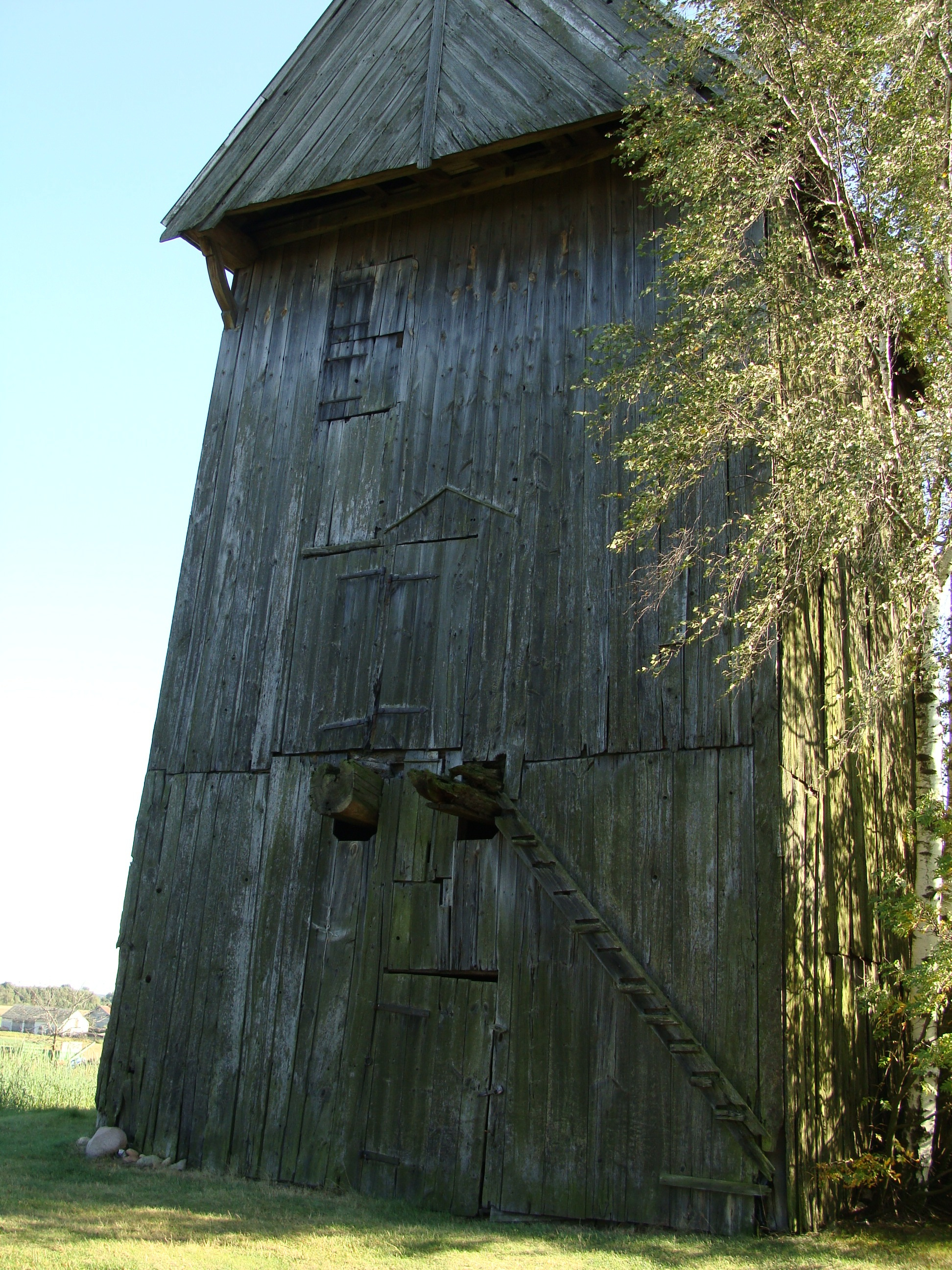

- Location within Poland
- Coordinates: 51°36′N 18°34′E
- Country: Poland
- Voivodeship: Łódź
- County: Sieradz
- Gmina: Wróblew

Sadokrzyce [sadɔˈkʂɨt͡sɛ] is a village in the administrative district of Gmina Wróblew, within Sieradz County, Łódź Voivodeship, in central Poland.
