= Liudmyla Bohuslavska =

Ukrainian artist of decorative and applied arts (born 1955)

- Людмила Броніславівна Богуславська
- Born: 16 May 1955 (age 71); Lviv
- Education: Lviv Institute of Applied and Decorative Arts
- Occupations: Artist of decorative and applied arts

Liudmyla Bohuslavska (Ukrainian: Людмила Броніславівна Богуславська; born 16 May 1955) is a Ukrainian artist of decorative and applied arts. Member of the National Union of Artists of Ukraine (1992).

== Biography ==
Liudmyla Bohuslavska was born on 16 May 1955, in Lviv.

In 1978, she graduated from the Lviv Institute of Applied and Decorative Arts, where her specialty teachers were Zenovii Flinta, Karlo Zvirynskyi, and Volodymyr Rybotytskyi. From 1985, she worked at the Lviv Experimental Ceramic and Sculptural Factory. Currently, she is engaged in creative work.

== Creativity ==
In 1978, she began presenting her works at exhibitions. Solo exhibitions have been held in Lviv (1992, 2010, 2012, 2015, 2016, 2019), Slavsko (2017), and Kyiv (2020). Individual works are preserved in the collections of the Odesa Museum of Western and Eastern Art, the National Museum-Preserve of Ukrainian Pottery in Opishnia, the Museum of Books and Printing of Ukraine, and others; as well as in private collections in Ukraine and around the world.

Among important works:

- A set of decorative vases and plates for the Lviv Military Hospital (1983), a decorative panel, vases, and reliefs for the Bibrka gas station in the Lviv Oblast (1985), decorative vases "Dereva" for the "Chobitok" store in Kyiv (1986), a decorative panel "Pory roku" for the children's hospital in Kyiv (1987);
- Ceramics: "Son", "Park" (both 2003).

== Awards ==
- Second prize at the III Intersymposium of Ceramics in Opishnia.

== Bibliography ==
- Bohuslavska Liudmyla Bronislavivna / Y. I. Shevchenko // Encyclopedia of Modern Ukraine [Online] / Eds. : I. М. Dziuba, A. I. Zhukovsky, M. H. Zhelezniak [et al.] ; National Academy of Sciences of Ukraine, Shevchenko Scientific Society. – Kyiv : The NASU institute of Encyclopedic Research, 2004.
