= Zawady, Łowicz County =

Zawady
- Village
- Location within Poland
- Coordinates: 52°2′50″N 19°56′51″E
- Country: Poland
- Voivodeship: Łódź
- County: Łowicz
- Gmina: Łowicz

Zawady [zaˈvadɨ] is a village in the administrative district of Gmina Łowicz, within Łowicz County, Łódź Voivodeship, in central Poland.
