= Włocin-Kolonia =

- Village
- Location within Poland
- Coordinates: 51°34′56″N 18°23′22″E
- Country: Poland
- Voivodeship: Łódź
- County: Sieradz
- Gmina: Błaszki

Włocin-Kolonia [ˈvwɔt͡ɕin kɔˈlɔɲa] is a village in the administrative district of Gmina Błaszki, within Sieradz County, Łódź Voivodeship, in central Poland.
