= Smaszków =

- Village
- Location within Poland
- Coordinates: 51°39′30″N 18°27′57″E
- Country: Poland
- Voivodeship: Łódź
- County: Sieradz
- Gmina: Błaszki
- Population: 260

Smaszków [ˈsmaʂkuf] is a village in the administrative district of Gmina Błaszki, within Sieradz County, Łódź Voivodeship, in central Poland.

The village has a population of 260.
