= Andrzej Ścibor-Bogusławski =

Andrzej Ścibor-Bogusławski (?-1729) was a Polish instigator at the Crown Court(1700), Crown Bailiff at Sieradzki (1703-1717), Wicepodkomorzy (bailiff border) at łęczycki sieradzki (1717 to 1718) and a Judge komisarskiego(1719).

== Family ==
Born into the powerful clan of Ostoja, Andrzej Bogusławski was the son of Marianna Rosowska (née Korab), heiress of Rososzycy and Martin Bogusławski, the heir to Wrzeszczewice. His paternal grandparents were Katarzyna Rościerska and Marcin Bogusławski, and on the maternal side Anna Pstrokońska and Filip Rosowski. Bogusławski had three siblings: Marianna Zabłocka, Stanisław, and Stefan.

His first wife was Teresa Pomianowska. He later married Katarzyna Górzyńska, with whom he had five children - Elżbieta Rembiewska, Barbara Rudnicka, Franciszek (a chorąży in the National Cavalry), Ignacy Piotr (a priest), and Jakub.

His uncle was the Monsignor Stanisław Ścibor-Bogusławski, Chancellor of Cardinal Radziejowski.

== Career ==
Andrzej Bogusławski held the office of Chief Crown Court instigator.(1700AD) In 1717 he was appointed by to the office of bailiff of the border (wicepodkomorzego) at łęczycki and a year later he was appointed at Sieradzki. This office he held for 11 years. He died in July 1729 year.
