= Bogusławice =

Bogusławice may refer to the following places in Poland:

- Bogusławice, Koło County in Greater Poland Voivodeship (central Poland)
- Bogusławice, Kalisz County in Greater Poland Voivodeship (central Poland)
- Bogusławice, Pleszew County in Greater Poland Voivodeship (west-central Poland)
- Bogusławice, Kuyavian-Pomeranian Voivodeship (central Poland)
- Bogusławice, Łódź Voivodeship (central Poland)
- Bogusławice, Oleśnica County in Lower Silesian Voivodeship (south-west Poland)
- Bogusławice, Wrocław County in Lower Silesian Voivodeship (south-west Poland)
- Bogusławice, Płońsk County in Masovian Voivodeship (east-central Poland)
- Bogusławice, Radom County in Masovian Voivodeship (east-central Poland)
- Bogusławice, Silesian Voivodeship (south Poland)
- Bogusławice, Świętokrzyskie Voivodeship (south-central Poland)
