= Wawrowice, Świętokrzyskie Voivodeship =

Wawrowice
- Village
- Location within Poland
- Coordinates: 50°18′36″N 20°39′36″E
- Country: Poland
- Voivodeship: Świętokrzyskie
- County: Busko
- Gmina: Wiślica

Wawrowice [vavrɔˈvit͡sɛ] is a village in the administrative district of Gmina Wiślica, within Busko County, Świętokrzyskie Voivodeship, in south-central Poland. It lies approximately 5 km (3 mi) south of Wiślica, 18 km (11 mi) south of Busko-Zdrój, and 64 km (40 mi) south of the regional capital Kielce.
