= Wągłczew =

- Village
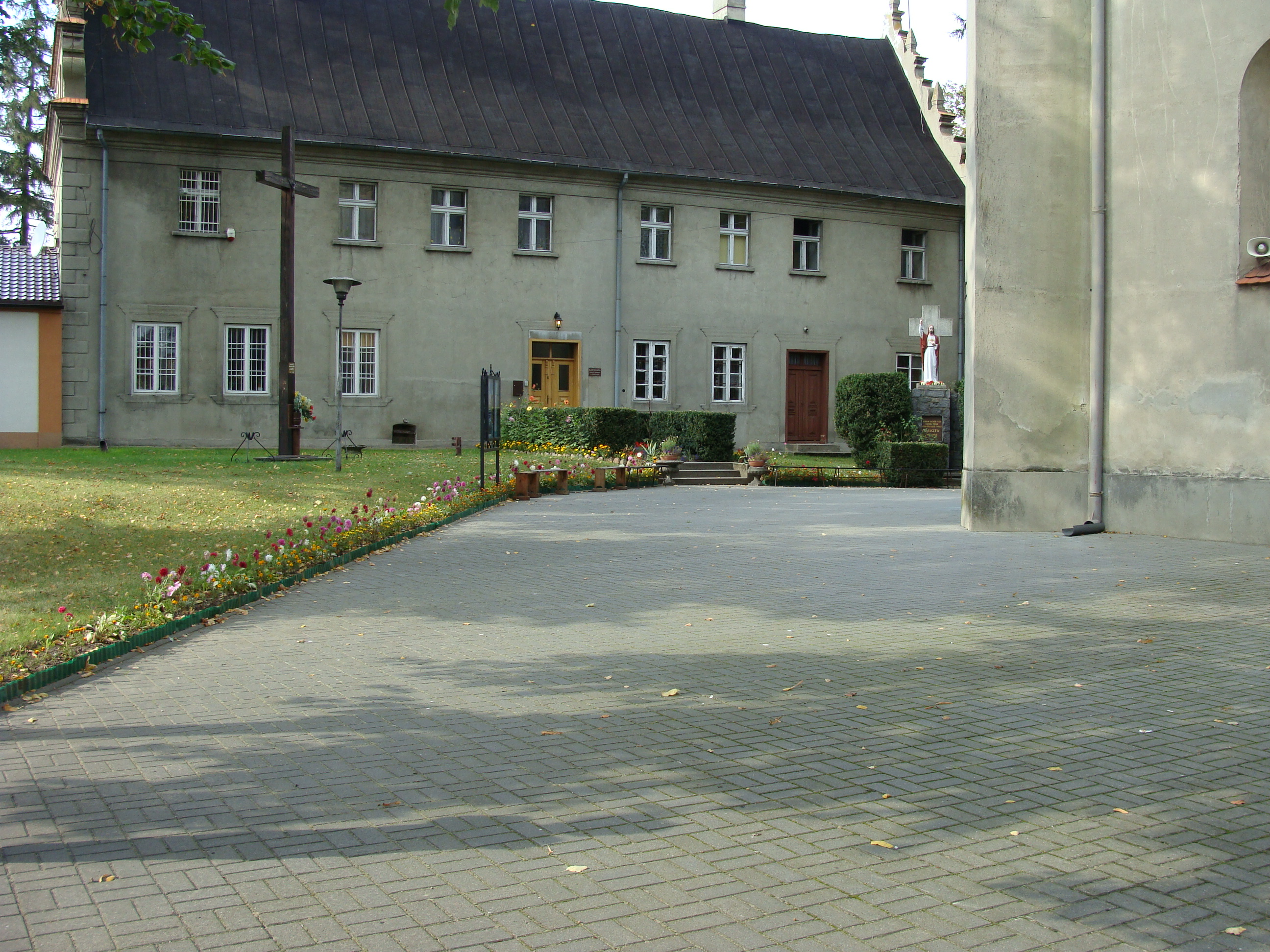
- Former monastery in Wągłczew, now Catholic parish

- Location within Poland
- Coordinates: 51°36′N 18°33′E
- Country: Poland
- Voivodeship: Łódź
- County: Sieradz
- Gmina: Wróblew
- First mentioned: 1358
- Time zone: UTC+1 (CET)
  - Summer (DST): UTC+2 (CEST)
- Vehicle registration: ESI

Wągłczew [ˈvɔŋɡwt͡ʂɛf] is a village in the administrative district of Gmina Wróblew, within Sieradz County, Łódź Voivodeship, in central Poland.

== History ==
First mentioned in 1358. It was a royal village, when King Casimir III the Great received Wągłczew and Sadokrzyce from the Augustinian Order in exchange for villages in the Kalisz Region.

In the nearby forests insurgents under Edmund Taczanowski operated during the failed January Uprising of 1863.

== Monuments ==
According to the "Liber beneficiorum ..." There was an ancient wooden church. The current was built in 1622-1626 by a mason Jerzy Hoffman. The church is a building late Renaissance, one-nave with a 4-storey tower, topped with a baroque dome. It has a barrel vault with lunettes on the type of stucco decoration Kalisz-Lublin. Windows on two floors. Marble plaque over the entrance:and Baroque interior. In the main altar from the 17th century Depicting a Crucifixion. Elaborately carved altar frontal, in the middle of a two-armed cross. Noteworthy is also the pulpit of the 18th century in the shape of a boat and valuable liturgical equipment of the seventeenth century of approx. 1648. Former convent next to the church, closed in 1865 has been used as a parsonage.

According to the register of monuments of the National Heritage Institute on the list of monuments are inscribed objects:

- Canons Regular monastery, 1626:
- church, now parish church of St. Clement, Reg. No. 866 of 10.28.1967
- monastery, now the rectory, Reg. No. 867 of 28.10.1967
- The Wągłczewie Roman Catholic cemetery with the graves of Karol Mniewski (d. 1870), Hilary Rola-Zakrzewski of Kaliszkowa (d. 1893), and his wife Adela of Wardęski-Załuskowski Godziemba (d. 1901).
