= Marcin Bogusławski =

Polish painter

- Born: 1980 (age 45–46); Warsaw
- Education: Academy of Fine Arts in Warsaw
- Known for: painting, drawing, graphics, mural painting
- Website: www.boguslawski.art.pl

Marcin Bogusławski (born 1980) is a Polish artist, painter, drawer, graphic and mural painter. He lives and works in Warsaw.

== Education ==
Marcin Bogusławski has studied painting and graphics at the Academy of Fine Arts in Warsaw. During his studies (2000-2006) he attended also the guest workshop run by professor Leon Tarasewicz. In 2006 graduated from painting (diploma under supervision of professor Stanisław Baj and diploma appendix from mural painting under supervision of professor Edward Tarkowski).

== Selected exhibitions ==
2012	W stronę światła (collective exhibition of painting by artists connected with the workshop of mural art of the Academy of Fine Arts in Warsaw), Galeria Autograf, Warsaw.
2010	Krystalit (individual exhibition), Galeria Fundacji Atelier, Warsaw.
2009	(collective exhibition), Aula Academy of Fine Arts in Warsaw, Warsaw.
2009	Ulica złoczyńców (collective exhibition), Grochowska 282, Warsaw.
2008	exhibition after en plein air (collective exhibition), Staszów.
2008	exhibition after en plein air at prof. Marian Czapla (collective exhibition), Szydłów.
2008	Pamiętniki Pokolenia Tamagotchi (collective exhibition), Galeria Klimy Bocheńskiej, Warsaw.
2006	Skały - diploma exhibition (individual exhibition), Academy of Fine Arts in Warsaw, Warsaw.
2005	trimester exhibition (collective exhibition), Falmouth College of Art, Falmouth.
2004	Zapisy - exhibition of drawings (collective exhibition), Galeria Aspekt, Warsaw.
2002	exhibition of paintings and graphics (individual exhibition), Klub Muza, Warsaw.
2001	20 miejsc na prace - exhibition of paintings (collective exhibition), Warsaw University Library, Warsaw.

== Bibliography ==
- Marcin Bogusławski - oficjalna strona artysty
- ArtInfo - Indeks artystów
