= Wrzeszczewice =

- Village
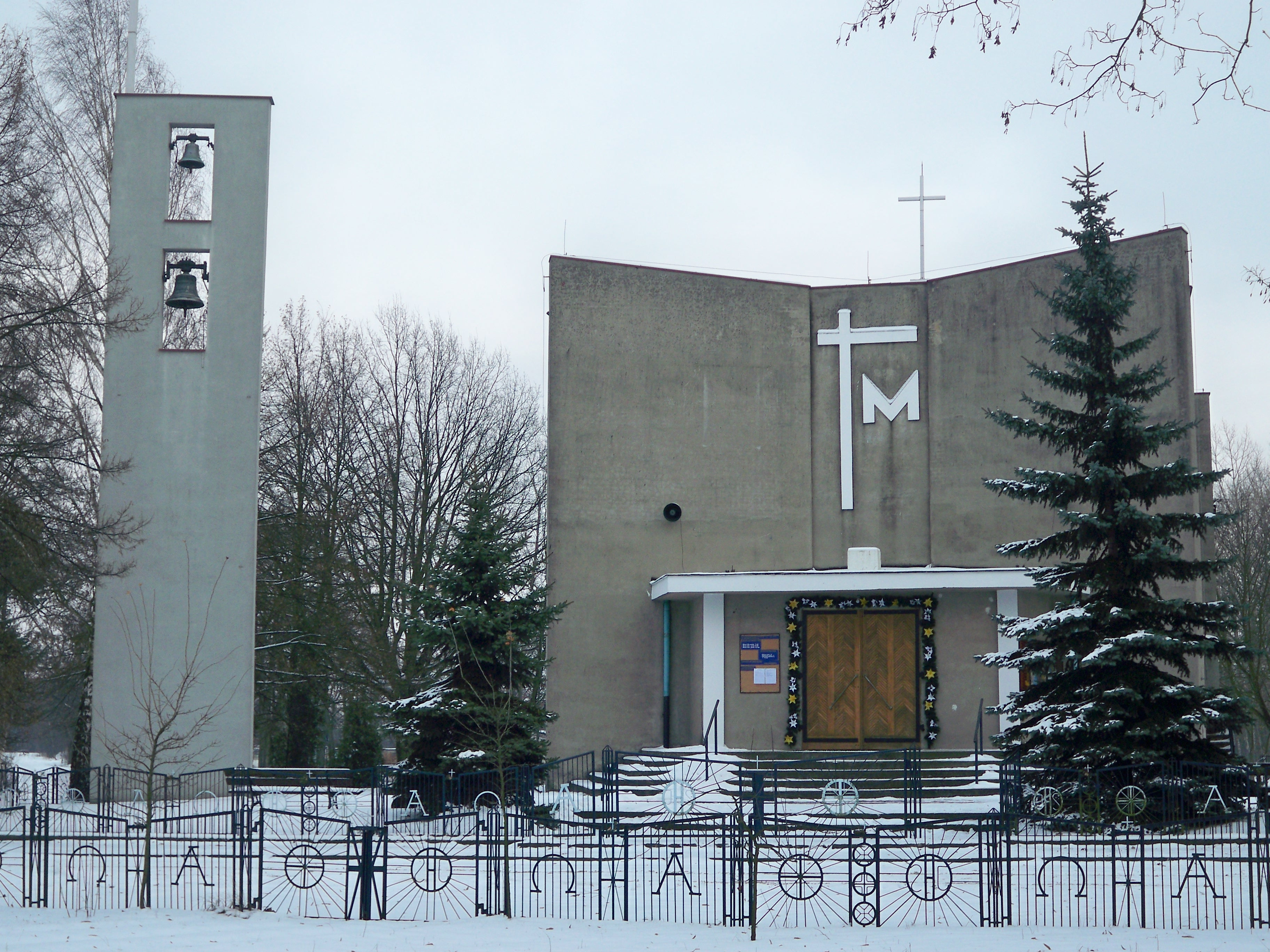
- Church of Saint Anne

- Location within Poland
- Coordinates: 51°40′N 19°6′E
- Country: Poland
- Voivodeship: Łódź
- County: Łask
- Gmina: Łask

Wrzeszczewice [vʐɛʂt͡ʂɛˈvit͡sɛ] is a village in the administrative district of Gmina Łask, within Łask County, Łódź Voivodeship, in central Poland.
