= Krystyna Ścibor-Bogusławska =

Polish official (died 1783)

Krystyna Ścibor-Bogusławska (?–1783) was a Polish official, serving as governor, Lady of regality, of Wągłczew, by appointment of King Poniatowski from 1773 to 1782.

== Life ==
Born into the Clan Ostoja, she was the daughter of Anna Jankowska and Franciszek Ścibor-Bogusławski, a captain of the National Cavalry. She married Antoni Łubieński the governor of Wągłczew, who was the son of Wiktoria Sariusz-Kałowska and Aleksander Łubieński also the governor in Wągłczew.

After the death of her husband on 1 November 1773, King Stanisław August Poniatowski made her Governor of Wągłczew for life. This was unusual at the time.

She remarried, to Józef Byszewski, an Army colonel, with whom she had two children. She died in 1783.
