= Bukovina (disambiguation) =

Bukovina is a geographical region in Romania and Ukraine.

Bukovina, Bukovyna or Bucovina may also refer to:

== Historical territorial units ==
- Bukovina District, a subdivision of the Habsburg monarchy and the Austrian Empire in 1774–1849
- Duchy of Bukovina, a crown land of the Austrian Empire and Austria-Hungary in 1849–1918
- Bukovina Governorate, a governorate of the Kingdom of Romania in 1941–1944

== Places in the Czech Republic ==
- Bukovina (Blansko District), a municipality and village in the South Moravian Region
- Bukovina nad Labem, a municipality and village in the Pardubice Region
- Bukovina u Čisté, a municipality and village in the Liberec Region
- Bukovina u Přelouče, a municipality and village in the Pardubice Region
- Bukovina, a village and part of Černilov in the Hradec Králové Region
- Bukovina, a village and part of Kralovice in the Plzeň Region
- Bukovina, a village and part of Mírová pod Kozákovem in the Liberec Region
- Bukovina, a village and part of Podbořanský Rohozec in the Ústí nad Labem Region
- Bukovina, a village and part of Turnov in the Liberec Region
- Bukovina, a village and part of Vítězná in the Hradec Králové Region
- Bukovina u Pecky, a village and part of Pecka in the Hradec Králové Region

== Other uses ==
- Bukovina, Liptovský Mikuláš District, a municipality and village in Slovakia
- Bukovyna Stadium, a stadium in Chernivtsi, Ukraine
- Bukovyna (newspaper), Ukrainian newspaper in Bukovyna in 1885–1918
- Bucovina (band), a Romanian band

== See also ==
- Bukovinka, a municipality and village in the Czech Republic
- Bukowina (disambiguation)
- Bucovăț (disambiguation)
