= Bukovinian dialect =

Bukovinian dialect or Bukovina dialect may refer to:

- Bukovinian Romanian dialect
- Pokuttia–Bukovina dialect, a dialect of Ukrainian
- Bukovinian Polish dialect

== See also ==
- Bukovina, a historical region split between Romania and Ukraine
- Bukovina (disambiguation)
