= Kokoszki (disambiguation) =

Kokoszki is a district of Gdańsk, Poland.

Kokoszki may also refer to the following places in Poland:

- Kokoszki, Podlaskie Voivodeship (north-east Poland)
- Kokoszki, Łódź Voivodeship (central Poland)
- Kokoszki, Greater Poland Voivodeship (west-central Poland)
- Kokoszki, Pomeranian Voivodeship (north Poland)
- Kokoszki, Warmian-Masurian Voivodeship (north Poland)
