= Golkow =

Golkow may refer to:

- Golków, Łódź Voivodeship, Poland
- Gołków, Masovian Voivodeship, Poland
