= Domaniew =

Domaniew may refer to the following places:

- Domaniew, Poddębice County in Łódź Voivodeship (central Poland)
- Domaniew, Sieradz County in Łódź Voivodeship (central Poland)
- Domaniew, Masovian Voivodeship (east-central Poland)
