= Selma Engel-Wijnberg =

Dutch Holocaust survivor (1922–2018)

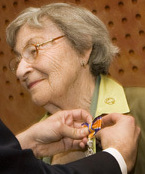
- Engel-Wijnberg in 2010
- Born: Saartje (Selme) Wijnberg; 15 May 1922; Groningen, Netherlands
- Died: 4 December 2018 (aged 96); Branford, Connecticut, US
- Spouse: Chaim Engel (m. 1945; died 2003)
- Children: 3
- Awards: Knight of the Order of Oranje-Nassau

Selma Engel-Wijnberg (born Saartje "Selme" Wijnberg; 15 May 1922 – 4 December 2018) was one of only two Dutch Jewish Holocaust survivors of the Sobibor extermination camp. She escaped during the 1943 uprising, hid in Poland, and survived the war. Engel-Wijnberg emigrated to the United States from Israel with her family in 1957, settling in Branford, Connecticut. She returned to Europe again only to testify against the war criminals of Sobibor. In 2010 she was in the Netherlands to receive the governmental honour of Knight in the Order of Oranje-Nassau.

== Early life ==
Wijnberg was born into a Jewish family in Groningen, Netherlands. She was raised in Zwolle, where her parents owned and managed the Hotel Wijnberg. There she attended local schools. Five days before Wijnberg turned 18, the Germans invaded the Netherlands on 10 May 1940. They soon began persecution of Jews. In September 1942 Wijnberg first hid in Utrecht, and later in De Bilt.

== Holocaust years ==
While hiding she used the name "Greetje van den Berg". During her arrest in Holland, she was twice offered escape from prison and country by the underground and twice declined the offer for fear of being alone and hope to rejoin her family which, she heard, had been taken to Poland. She was rounded up by Nazi forces on 18 December 1942. Two months later she was transferred to Camp Vught, then to the transit Camp Westerbork, and finally deported to Sobibor extermination camp on 6 April 1943, along with 2,019 other Jewish men, women and children. She survived the selection at arrival, and was assigned to the Arbeitshäftlinge unit in Lager II. There she was forced to sort the clothes of gas chamber victims so that they could be sent to German civilians disguised as charitable donations. When guards were looking the other way, she would surreptitiously slash fine items to prevent them from being of use.

In the sorting barracks Wijnberg met her future husband, Chaim Engel (10 January 1916 – 4 July 2003), a Polish Jew from Brudzew, who was six years her senior. They were able to communicate in German. He helped her survive; for instance, when she contracted typhus and was weakened, he carried her to the latrines and helped her rest when the guards weren't looking.

During the revolt in Sobibor on 14 October 1943, Wijnberg and Engel escaped together. She provided Chaim with a knife, with which he stabbed a Nazi guard, and the couple fled under gunfire through the main gate and into the forest. They found shelter with two Polish farmers, named Adam and Stefka, a married couple, whom they paid for hiding them. They survived for nine months in a barn's hayloft until the retreat of Nazi Germany from occupied Poland in July 1944 during Operation Bagration, the Red Army counter-offensive. By that time, Selma was pregnant.

The couple married, and they journeyed through Poland via Chełm and Parczew, where their son Emiel was born, then to Lublin. They crossed Ukraine by train to Chernivtsi and to Odessa (Odesa), and soon left by boat for Marseille, France. Chaim had to be smuggled aboard the ship, because Poles were not allowed to go to France. Because of this, Selma was nervous, and couldn't give any breastmilk to her son Emiel. She went to the kitchen, and asked for milk. She was given 'very heavy creamy milk', which she fed to her son. Because of this, the child got ill, and died within 24 hours. His body was buried at sea near Naxos. From Marseille, the couple travelled north by train to Zwolle and returned to Selma's parents' home, Hotel Wijnberg, in the Netherlands.

== After the Second World War ==
In the Netherlands Chaim and Selma married again on 18 September 1945. The police of Zwolle decided that Selma, by marrying Engel, a Pole, had lost her citizenship and become a Polish citizen. The couple could not be returned to Poland because the latter's government no longer accepted the return of Polish citizens expelled from foreign countries. Officials decided against interning the Engels in a displaced persons camp for foreigners near Valkenswaard because the holding center was full, and Wijnberg was a Dutch native.

While they lived in Zwolle, Engel-Wijnberg gave birth to two more children, a son and a daughter. They set up a velvet fabric and fashion store. In a 2015 interview, she said she and Chaim hated the Netherlands for their treatment after the war, when they tried to deprive her of her nationality and intended to deport them. The family immigrated to Israel in 1951, where they relocated several times. However, Engel did not feel comfortable there, so in 1957 they decided to emigrate to the United States. They settled in Branford, Connecticut. They returned to Europe only to testify against the war criminals of Sobibor.

On 12 April 2010, Minister Ab Klink apologised to Engel-Wijnberg for her treatment after the war, on behalf of the Dutch government, during the Westerbork Camp remembrance ceremony. Despite rejecting the apology, Engel-Wijnberg accepted the government's honour of Knight in the Order of Oranje-Nassau. This occasion was the first time since she had left in 1951 that she returned to the Netherlands. Chaim Engel died in Branford, Connecticut in 2003. Engel-Wijnberg died in Westport, Connecticut, on 4 December 2018 at the age of 96.

== Representation in other media ==
- In the 1987 movie, Escape from Sobibor, her character was played by Ellis van Maarseveen.
- Ad van Liempt wrote a 2010 biography about Engel-Wijnberg entitled Selma: De vrouw die Sobibor overleefde (Selma: The Woman Who Survived Sobibor); (ISBN 978-90-74274-42-5)
- Van Liempt also made a documentary of the same title about Engel-Wijnberg, which was aired by the NOS on Dutch television in 2010.
