= Rowiński =

Rowiński (feminine: Rowińska; plural: Rowińscy) is a Polish surname. It is a toponymic surname derived from placenames, sch as Rowiny, Równa, Rówień, now Równia, etc. A variant is Rawiński. Notable people with this surname include:

- Francis Rowinski (1918–1990), American bishop
- Jim Rowinski (born 1961), American basketball player
- Robert Rowiński (born 1984), Polish dancer and choreographer
- Vikentsiy Ravinski (Wincenty Rowiński; 1786–1855), Belarusian poet and playwright

== See also ==
- Rewiński
