= Sarny (disambiguation) =

Sarny may refer to:

- Sarny, a town in Ukraine
- Sarny, Lviv Oblast, a village in Ukraine
- Sarny, Cherkasy Oblast, a village in Ukraine
- Sarny, Łódź Voivodeship, central Poland
- Sarny, Lublin Voivodeship, east Poland
- Sarny, Lower Silesian Voivodeship, south-western Poland
- Sarny (novel) - a novel by Gary Paulsen
