= Bukowina =

Bukowina may refer to the geographical region of Bukovina, now divided between Romania and Ukraine and known in German and Polish as Bukowina.

Bukowina may also refer to any of the following places in Poland:

- Bukowina, Lesser Poland Voivodeship
- Bukowina, Piotrków County in Łódź Voivodeship
- Bukowina, Sieradz County in Łódź Voivodeship
- Bukowina, Lower Silesian Voivodeship
- Bukowina, Biłgoraj County in Lublin Voivodeship
- Bukowina, Gmina Tomaszów Lubelski, Tomaszów County in Lublin Voivodeship
- Bukowina, Lubusz Voivodeship
- Bukowina, Jarosław County in Subcarpathian Voivodeship
- Bukowina, Nisko County in Subcarpathian Voivodeship
- Bukowina, Pomeranian Voivodeship

== See also ==
- Bukovina (disambiguation)
