= Adamki =

Adamki may refer to the following places:

- Adamki, Kuyavian-Pomeranian Voivodeship (north-central Poland)
- Adamki, Łódź Voivodeship (central Poland)
- Adamki, Pomeranian Voivodeship (north Poland)
