= Bukovats =

Bukovats may be the pronunciation of either:

- Bukovac, several places in Bosnia and Herzegovina, Serbia and Croatia
- Bucovăț, several places in Romania and Moldavia
