= Gmina Błaszki =

Gmina Błaszki Błaszki Commune
- Gmina
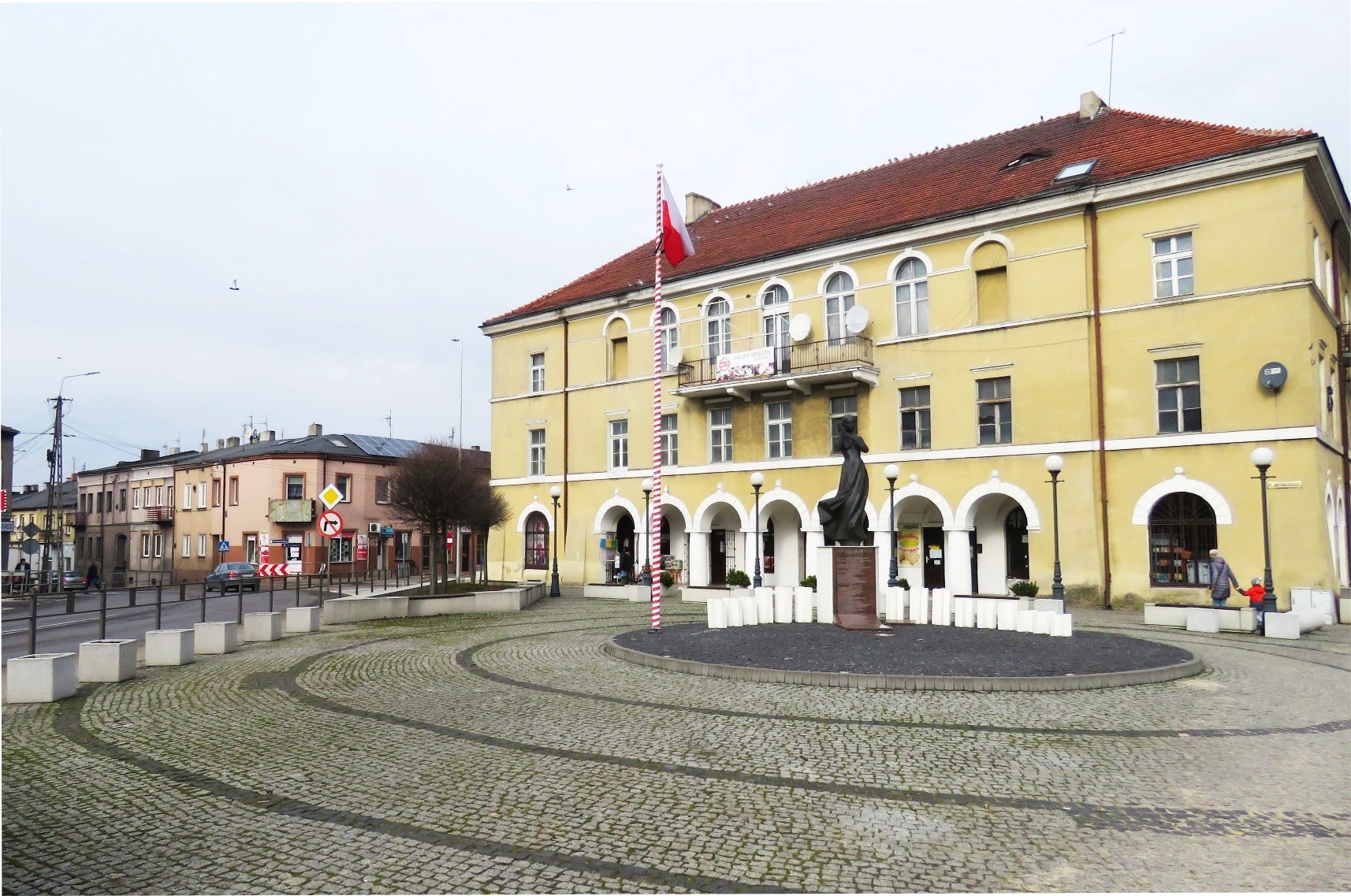

- Flag Coat of arms
- Interactive map of Gmina Błaszki
- Coordinates (Błaszki): 51°39′N 18°26′E
- Country: Poland
- Voivodeship: Łódź
- County: Sieradz
- Seat: Błaszki

Area
  - Total: 201.63 km^{2} (77.85 sq mi)

Population (2006)
  - Total: 15,090
  - Density: 74.84/km^{2} (193.8/sq mi)
  - Urban: 2,179
  - Rural: 12,911
- Car plates: ESI
- Website: ugblaszki.republika.pl

Gmina Błaszki is an urban-rural gmina (administrative district) in Sieradz County, Łódź Voivodeship, in central Poland. Established by the noble family Baszczyk or Blaszczyk (means of Baszczyk/Blaszczyk). Its seat is the town of Błaszki, which lies approximately 23 kilometres (14 mi) west of Sieradz and 73 km (45 mi) west of the regional capital Łódź.

The gmina covers an area of 201.63 square kilometres (77.8 sq mi), and as of 2006 its total population is 15,090, of which the population of Błaszki is 2,179, and the population of the rural part of the gmina is 12,911.

== Villages ==
Apart from the town of Błaszki (Baszczyk), Gmina Błaszki contains the villages and settlements of:

- Adamki
- Borysławice
- Brończyn
- Brudzew
- Bukowina
- Chociszew
- Chrzanowice
- Cienia Wielka
- Domaniew
- Garbów
- Golków
- Gorzałów
- Gruszczyce
- Grzymaczew
- Gzików
- Jasionna
- Kalinowa
- Kamienna-Kolonia
- Kamienna-Wieś
- Kije
- Kobylniki
- Kociołki
- Kokoszki
- Kołdów
- Korzenica
- Kwasków
- Lubanów
- Łubna-Jakusy
- Łubna-Jarosłaj
- Maciszewice
- Marianów
- Morawki
- Mroczki Małe
- Nacesławice
- Niedoń
- Orzeżyn
- Romanów
- Równa
- Sarny
- Sędzimirowice
- Skalmierz
- Smaszków
- Stok Nowy
- Stok Polski
- Sudoły
- Suliszewice
- Tuwalczew
- Włocin-Kolonia
- Włocin-Wieś
- Wójcice
- Wojków
- Woleń
- Wrząca
- Zawady
- Żelisław
- Żelisław-Kolonia

== Neighbouring gminas ==
Gmina Błaszki is bordered by the gminas of Brąszewice, Brzeziny, Goszczanów, Szczytniki, Warta and Wróblew.
