= Łubna-Jakusy =

- Village
- Location within Poland
- Coordinates: 51°35′N 18°30′E
- Country: Poland
- Voivodeship: Łódź
- County: Sieradz
- Gmina: Błaszki

Łubna-Jakusy [ˈwubna jaˈkusɨ] is a village in the administrative district of Gmina Błaszki, within Sieradz County, Łódź Voivodeship, in central Poland.
