= Sudoły, Łódź Voivodeship =

Sudoły
- Village
- Location within Poland
- Coordinates: 51°34′33″N 18°30′6″E
- Country: Poland
- Voivodeship: Łódź
- County: Sieradz
- Gmina: Błaszki

Sudoły [suˈdɔwɨ] is a village in the administrative district of Gmina Błaszki, within Sieradz County, Łódź Voivodeship, in central Poland.
