= Kociołki, Sieradz County =

Kociołki
- Village
- Location within Poland
- Coordinates: 51°40′22″N 18°28′57″E
- Country: Poland
- Voivodeship: Łódź
- County: Sieradz
- Gmina: Błaszki

Kociołki [kɔˈt͡ɕɔu̯ki] is a village in the administrative district of Gmina Błaszki, within Sieradz County, Łódź Voivodeship, in central Poland.
