= Woleń =

- Village
- Location within Poland
- Coordinates: 51°40′48″N 18°26′54″E
- Country: Poland
- Voivodeship: Łódź
- County: Sieradz
- Gmina: Błaszki
- Population: 120

Woleń [ˈvɔlɛɲ] is a village in the administrative district of Gmina Błaszki, within Sieradz County, Łódź Voivodeship, in central Poland.
