= Mroczki Małe =

- Village
- Location within Poland
- Coordinates: 51°43′2″N 18°25′13″E
- Country: Poland
- Voivodeship: Łódź
- County: Sieradz
- Gmina: Błaszki
- Population: 170

Mroczki Małe (Polish pronunciation: [ˈmrɔt͡ʂkʲi ˈmawɛ]) is a village in the administrative district of Gmina Błaszki, within Sieradz County, Łódź Voivodeship, in central Poland.
