= Wrząca, Sieradz County =

Wrząca
- Village
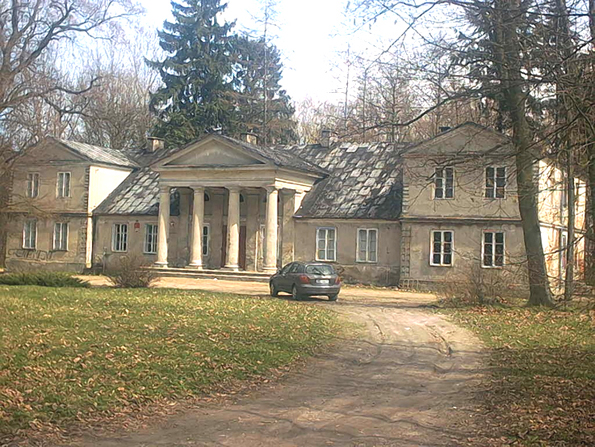
- Manor

- Location within Poland
- Coordinates: 51°36′N 18°27′E
- Country: Poland
- Voivodeship: Łódź
- County: Sieradz
- Gmina: Błaszki

Wrząca [ˈvʐɔnt͡sa] is a village in the administrative district of Gmina Błaszki, within Sieradz County, Łódź Voivodeship, in central Poland.
