= Kamienna-Wieś =

- Village
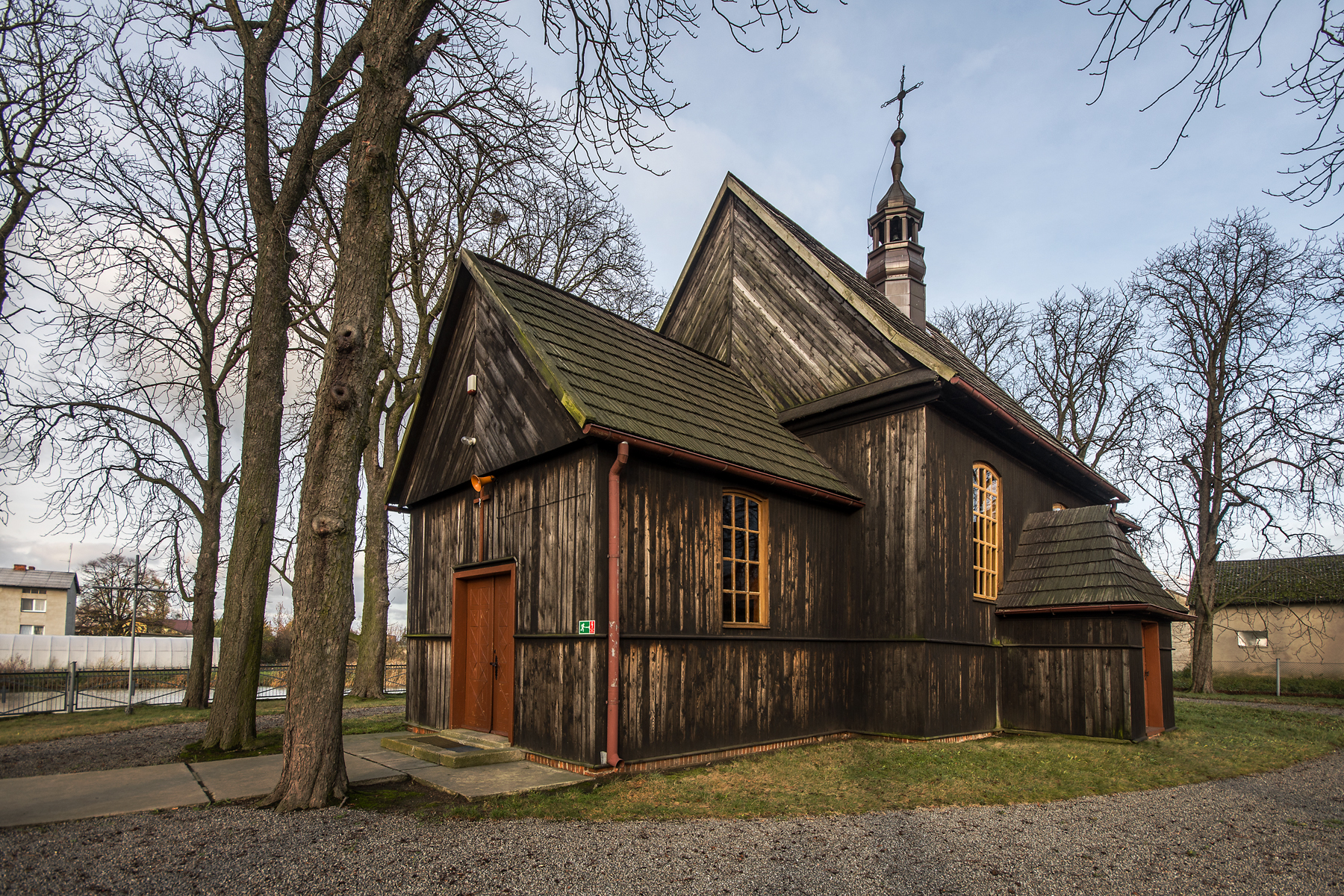
- Catholic church

- Location within Poland
- Coordinates: 51°39′50″N 18°23′2″E
- Country: Poland
- Voivodeship: Łódź
- County: Sieradz
- Gmina: Błaszki

Kamienna-Wieś [kaˈmjɛnna ˈvjɛɕ] is a village in the administrative district of Gmina Błaszki, within Sieradz County, Łódź Voivodeship, in central Poland.
