= Morawki =

- Village
- Location within Poland
- Coordinates: 51°42′N 18°27′E
- Country: Poland
- Voivodeship: Łódź
- County: Sieradz
- Gmina: Błaszki
- Elevation: 120 m (390 ft)
- Population (approx.): 200

Morawki [mɔˈrafki] is a village in the administrative district of Gmina Błaszki, within Sieradz County, Łódź Voivodeship, in central Poland.

The village has an approximate population of 200.
