= Skalmierz =

- Village
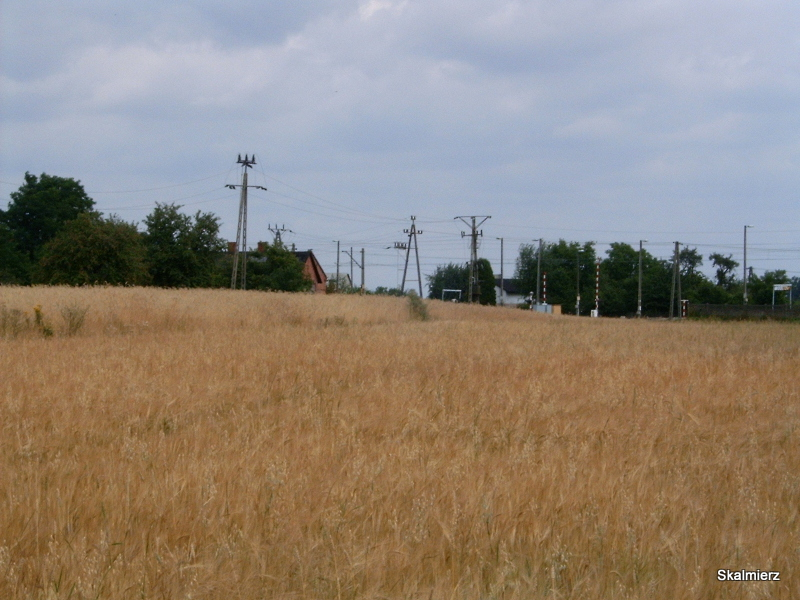

- Location within Poland
- Coordinates: 51°42′N 18°25′E
- Country: Poland
- Voivodeship: Łódź
- County: Sieradz
- Gmina: Błaszki

Skalmierz [ˈskalmjɛʂ] is a village in the administrative district of Gmina Błaszki, within Sieradz County, Łódź Voivodeship, in central Poland.
