= Gruszczyce =

- Village
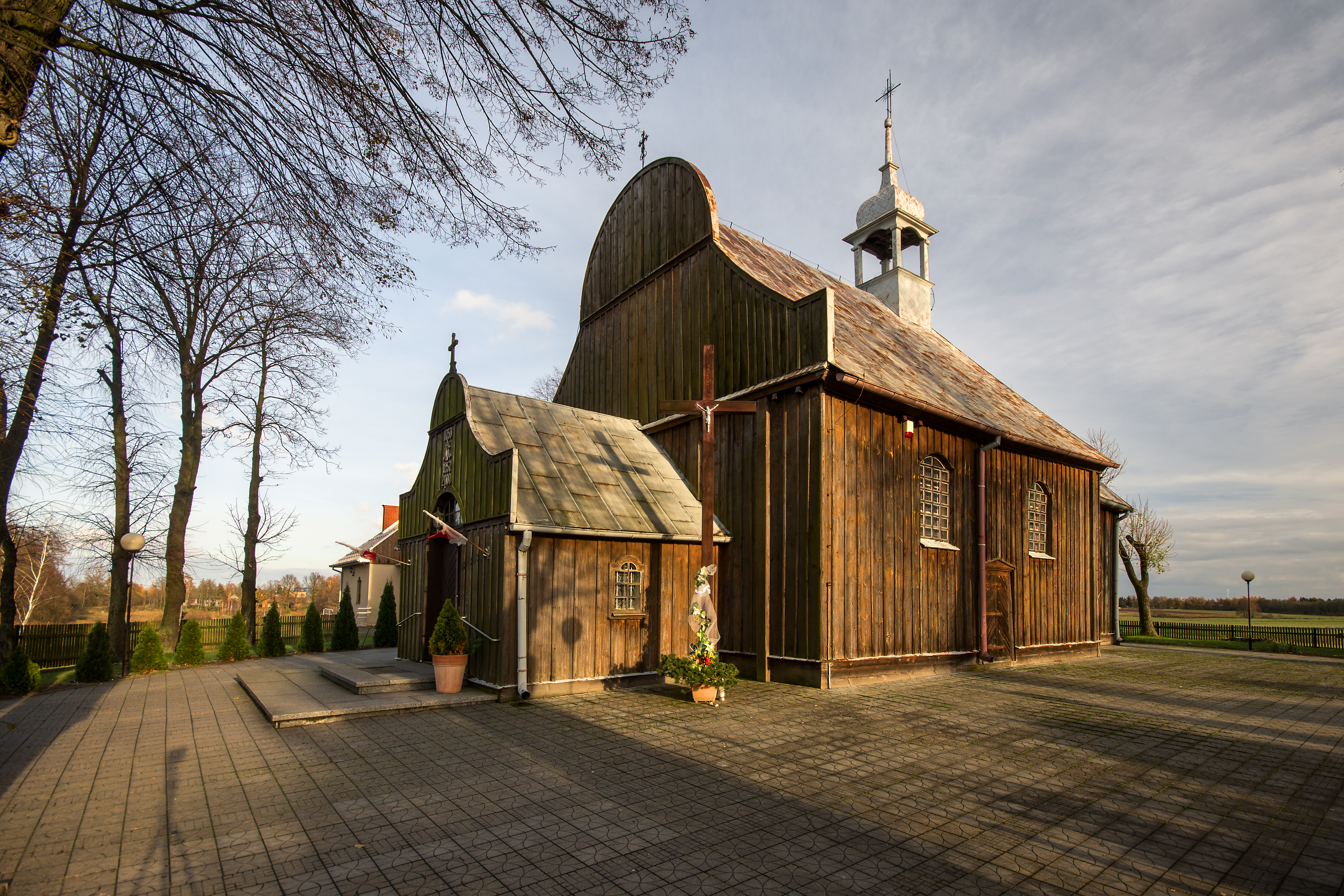
- Catholic church

- Location within Poland
- Coordinates: 51°36′N 18°28′E
- Country: Poland
- Voivodeship: Łódź
- County: Sieradz
- Gmina: Błaszki
- Population: 462

Gruszczyce [ɡruʂˈt͡ʂɨt͡sɛ] is a village in the administrative district of Gmina Błaszki, within Sieradz County, Łódź Voivodeship, in central Poland.
