= Ceasul aducerii-aminte =

Studio album by Bucovina
- Released: 2006
- Studio: Glasul Transilvan (Cluj-Napoca)
- Genre: Folk metal
- Length: 33:01
- Label: Lupii Daciei

Bucovina chronology
Ceasul aducerii-aminte (2006)	Duh (2010)

Ceasul aducerii-aminte (English: Hour of Remembrance) is the debut studio album by Romanian folk metal band Bucovina, released in 2006 by the record label Lupii Daciei.

== Background and recording ==
Bucovina was founded in 2000 by guitarist Florin "Crivăț" Țibu and bassist Harbard in Iași. Shortly after, Harbard left the band and Bogdan "Vifor" Mihu joined it as a drummer; in 2002, the bass player was Brazilian Paolo Cito Caminha and a second guitarist was Bogdan Luparu. Between 2002 and 2005, Bucovina suffered "some unwanted changes" and went on hiatus when Luparu moved in Suceava. During this period, Țibu and Mihu started a new musical project, a death metal/grindcore band called Venă Cavă.

After Luparu came back, Ceasul aducerii-aminte was released in 2006, consisting of the best songs recorded during the early years of the band. "Sunt munți și păduri", "Năpraznică goană", "Bucovina, inima mea" și "Vinterdoden" were written in late 1990s and early 2000s. Comparing Ceasul aducerii-aminte with their next release, extended play Duh (2010), Țibu emphasized the difference in production quality: "Ceasul was recorded in a living room, excepting the drums, who were recorded at [studio] Glas Transilvan in Cluj. Duh was recorded with infinitely better equipment."

== Track listing ==
No.	Title	Length
1.	"Valea plângerii (The Valley of Cries)"	1:58
2.	"Sunt munți și păduri (There are Mountains and Forests)"	4:03
3.	"Luna preste vârfuri (The Moon Over the Summits)"	4:36
4.	"Strașnic neamul meu (My Nation is Strong)"	4:41
5.	"Țara de dincolo de vârfuri de brad (The Country Beyond the Fir Crowns)"	4:24
6.	"Năpraznica goană (Impetuous Chase)"	4:29
7.	"Vinterdoden (Winter Dead)"	5:25
8.	"Bucovina, inima mea (Bucovina, My Heart)"	3:25
Total length:		33:01
