= Stok Nowy =

- Village
- Location within Poland
- Coordinates: 51°36′48″N 18°22′15″E
- Country: Poland
- Voivodeship: Łódź
- County: Sieradz
- Gmina: Błaszki

Stok Nowy [ˈstɔk ˈnɔvɨ] is a village in the administrative district of Gmina Błaszki, within Sieradz County, Łódź Voivodeship, in central Poland.
