= Niedoń =

- Village
- Location within Poland
- Coordinates: 51°35′6″N 18°28′11″E
- Country: Poland
- Voivodeship: Łódź
- County: Sieradz
- Gmina: Błaszki

Niedoń [ˈɲɛdɔɲ] is a village in the administrative district of Gmina Błaszki, within Sieradz County, Łódź Voivodeship, in central Poland.
