= Gorzałów =

- Village
- Location within Poland
- Coordinates: 51°42′20″N 18°29′58″E
- Country: Poland
- Voivodeship: Łódź
- County: Sieradz
- Gmina: Błaszki

Gorzałów [ɡɔˈʐawuf] is a village in the administrative district of Gmina Błaszki, within Sieradz County, Łódź Voivodeship, in central Poland.
