= Romanów, Sieradz County =

Romanów
- Village
- Location within Poland
- Coordinates: 51°38′N 18°22′E
- Country: Poland
- Voivodeship: Łódź
- County: Sieradz
- Gmina: Błaszki
- Population: 174

Romanów [rɔˈmanuf] is a village in the administrative district of Gmina Błaszki, within Sieradz County, Łódź Voivodeship, in central Poland.
