= Lubanów, Sieradz County =

Village in Gmina Błaszki, Poland

Lubanów
- Village
- Location within Poland
- Coordinates: 51°39′10″N 18°26′50″E
- Country: Poland
- Voivodeship: Łódź
- County: Sieradz
- Gmina: Błaszki

Lubanów [luˈbanuf] is a village in the administrative district of Gmina Błaszki, within Sieradz County, Łódź Voivodeship, in central Poland.
