= Nacesławice =

- Village
- Location within Poland
- Coordinates: 51°43′44″N 18°26′10″E
- Country: Poland
- Voivodeship: Łódź
- County: Sieradz
- Gmina: Błaszki

Nacesławice [nat͡sɛswaˈvit͡sɛ] is a village in the administrative district of Gmina Błaszki, within Sieradz County, Łódź Voivodeship, in central Poland.
