= Ad van Liempt =

Dutch journalist (born 1949)

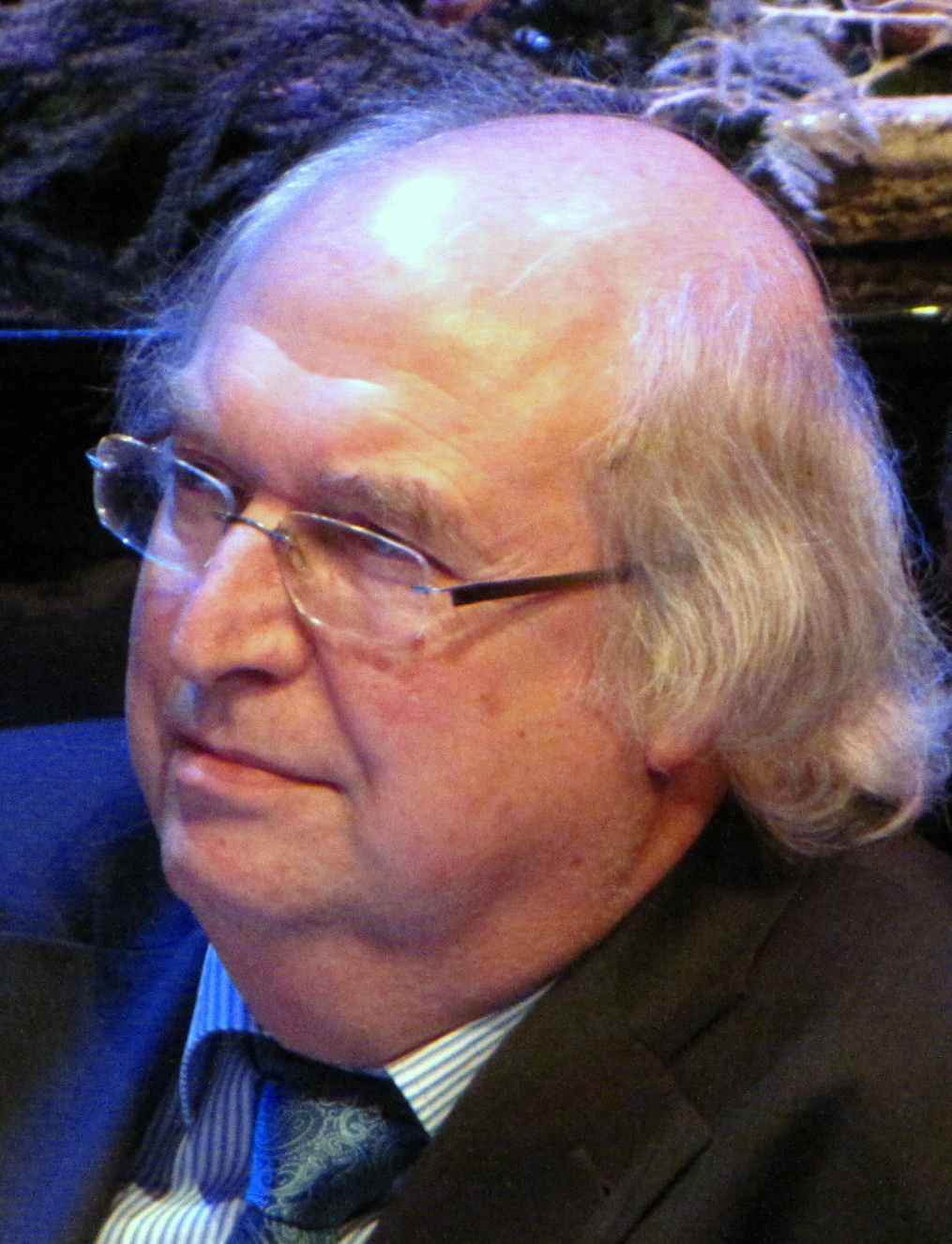
Ad van Liempt (2010)

Ad van Liempt (Dutch pronunciation: [ˈɑt fɑn ˈlimpt]; born 21 May 1949, Utrecht) is a Dutch journalist, writer and a TV producer. He has written several books, including a biography of Prince Bernhard. He also initiated the history program Andere Tijden (Other Times).

Outside the Netherlands he is best known for his book Kopgeld: Nederlandse premiejagers op zoek naar joden, 1943 which was translated into English and published as Hitler's Bounty Hunters: The Betrayal of the Jews. It described the process by which Nazis paid bounties to Dutch people, particularly police and members of the Central Bureau for Jewish Emigration, for information on the locations of Jews.

He wrote Selma: De vrouw die Sobibor overleefde (2010), a biography of Selma Engel-Wijnberg, one of two Dutch survivors of Sobibor Extermination Camp during the Holocaust.
