= Jasionna, Sieradz County =

Jasionna
- Village
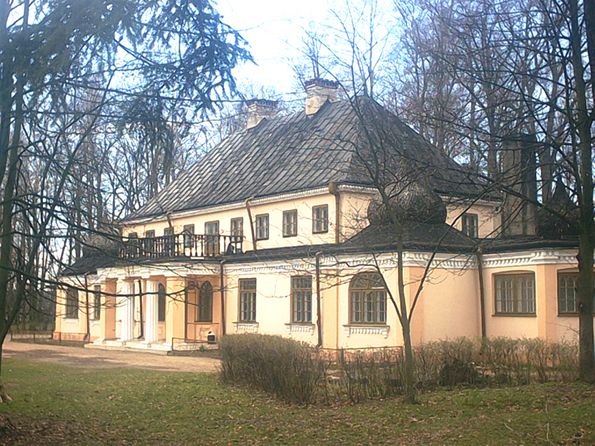
- Manor in Jasionna

- Location within Poland
- Coordinates: 51°34′39″N 18°28′16″E
- Country: Poland
- Voivodeship: Łódź
- County: Sieradz
- Gmina: Błaszki

Jasionna [jaˈɕɔnna] is a village in the administrative district of Gmina Błaszki, within Sieradz County, Łódź Voivodeship, in central Poland.
