= Sędzimirowice =

- Village
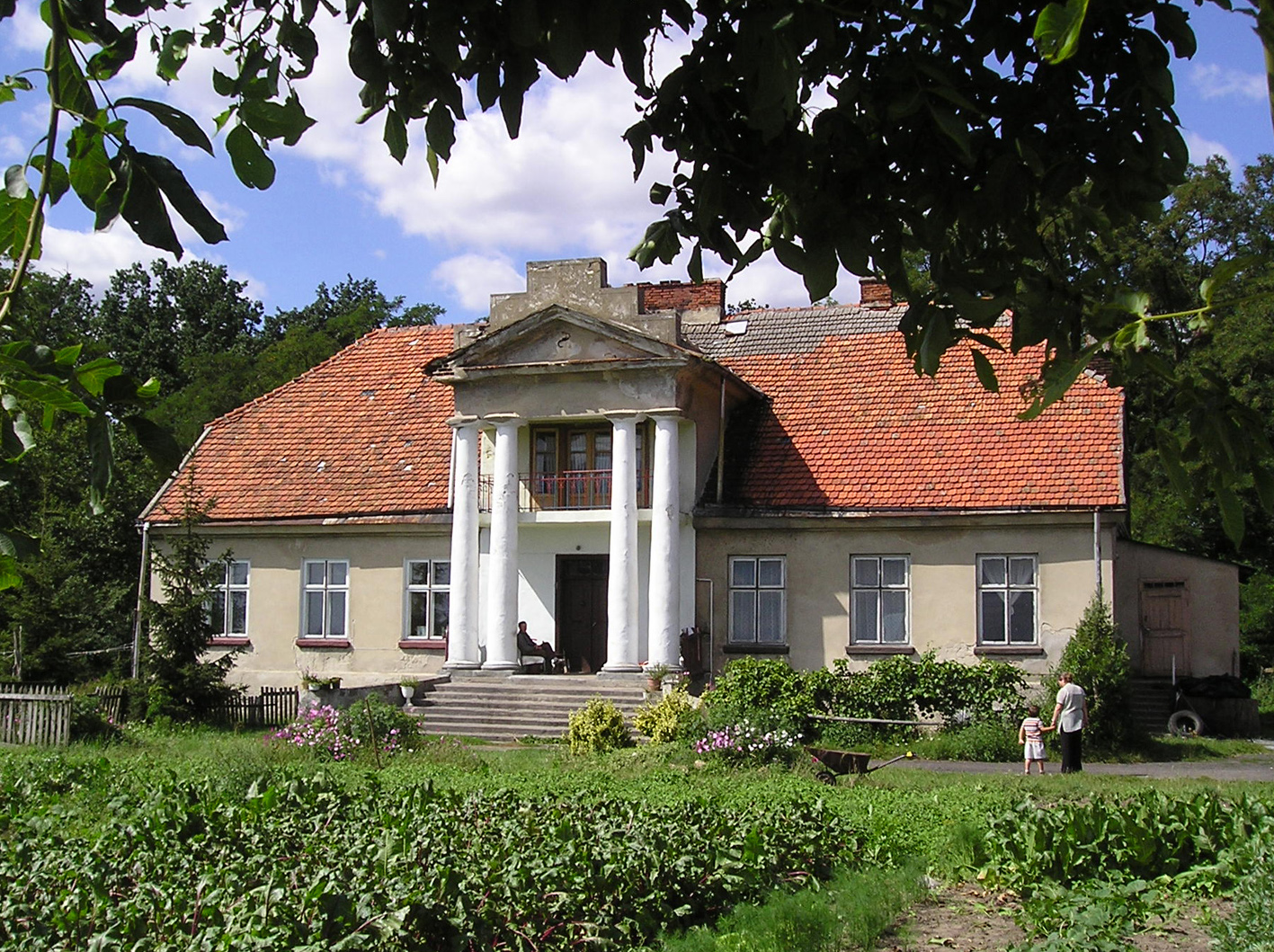
- Manor

- Location within Poland
- Coordinates: 51°43′N 18°26′E
- Country: Poland
- Voivodeship: Łódź
- County: Sieradz
- Gmina: Błaszki

Sędzimirowice [sɛnd͡ʑimirɔˈvit͡sɛ] is a village in the administrative district of Gmina Błaszki, within Sieradz County, Łódź Voivodeship, in central Poland.
