= Zawady, Sieradz County =

Zawady
- Village
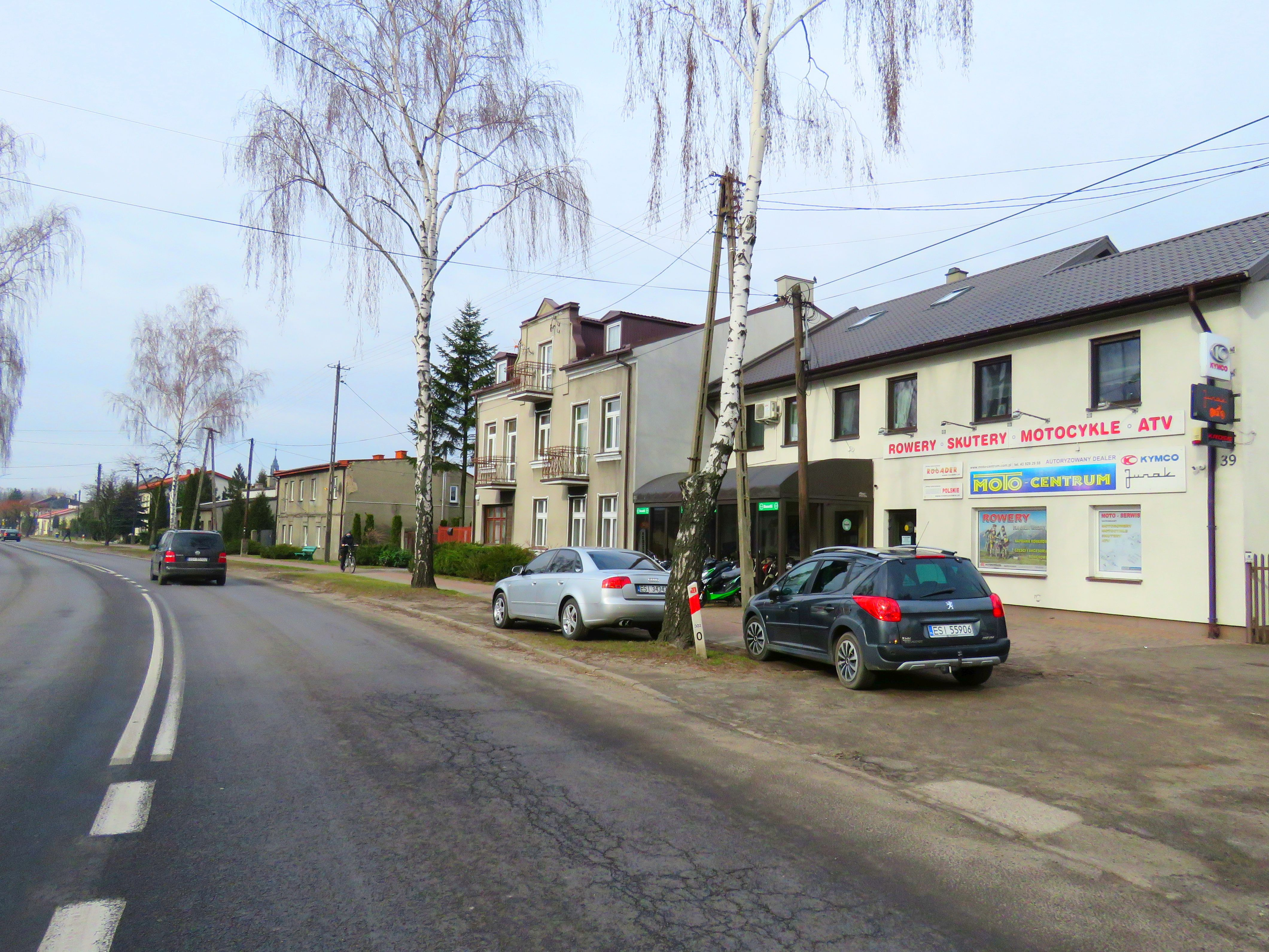

- Location within Poland
- Coordinates: 51°38′39″N 18°28′55″E
- Country: Poland
- Voivodeship: Łódź
- County: Sieradz
- Gmina: Błaszki
- Website: farm.webbrokers.pl

Zawady [zaˈvadɨ] is a village in the administrative district of Gmina Błaszki, within Sieradz County, Łódź Voivodeship, in central Poland.
