= Równa =

Równa may refer to the following places in Poland:

- Równa, Lower Silesian Voivodeship (south-west Poland)
- Równa, Łódź Voivodeship (central Poland)
