= Marianów, Gmina Błaszki =

Marianów
- Village
- Location within Poland
- Coordinates: 51°34′22″N 18°24′39″E
- Country: Poland
- Voivodeship: Łódź
- County: Sieradz
- Gmina: Błaszki

Marianów [maˈrjanuf] is a village in the administrative district of Gmina Błaszki, within Sieradz County, Łódź Voivodeship, in central Poland.
