= Kobylniki, Sieradz County =

Kobylniki
- Village
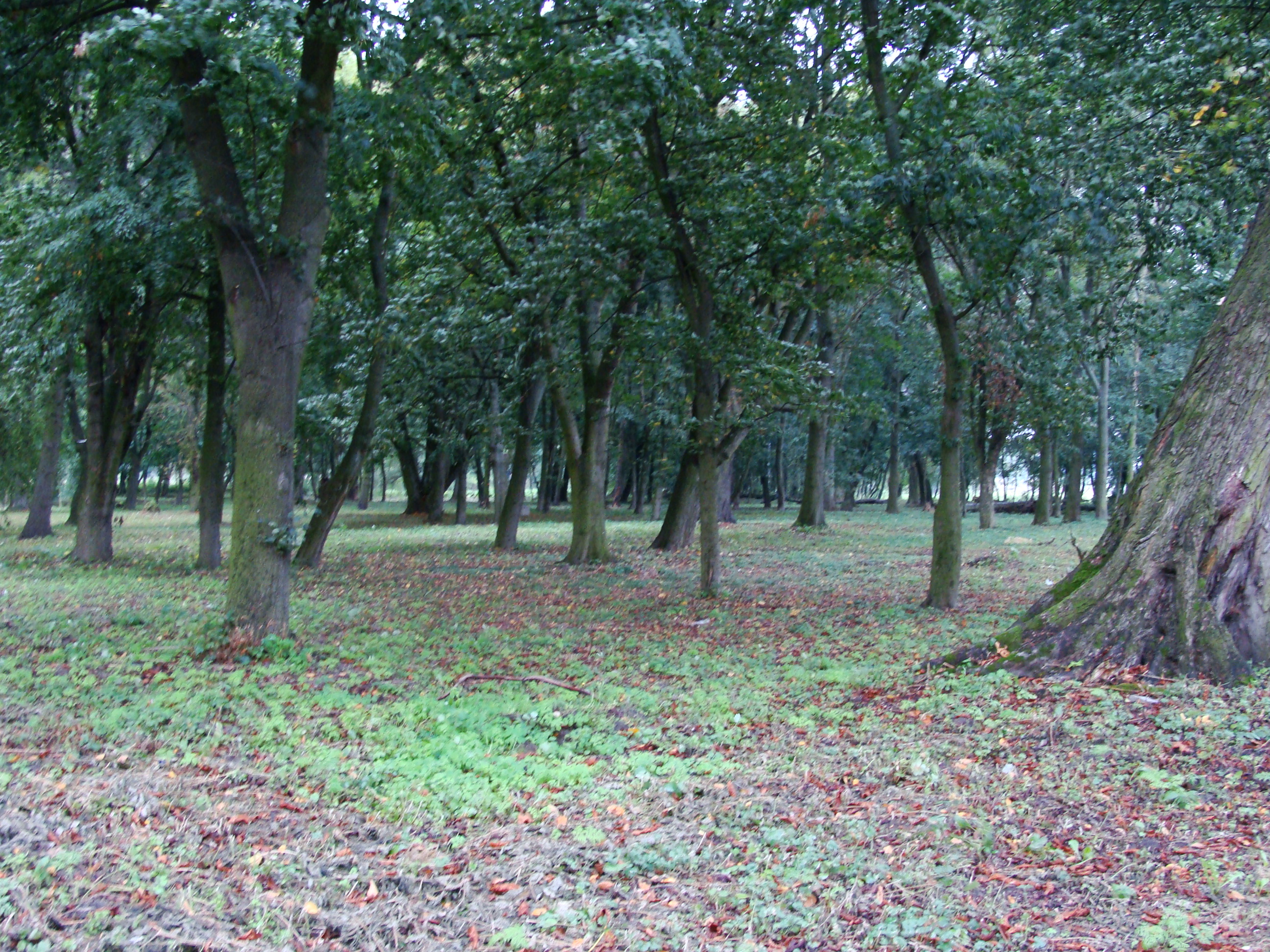
- Park in Kobylniki

- Location within Poland
- Coordinates: 51°42′46″N 18°29′36″E
- Country: Poland
- Voivodeship: Łódź
- County: Sieradz
- Gmina: Błaszki

Kobylniki [kɔbɨlˈniki] is a village in the administrative district of Gmina Błaszki, within Sieradz County, Łódź Voivodeship, in central Poland.
