= Chociszew, Sieradz County =

Chociszew
- Village
- Location within Poland
- Coordinates: 51°41′49″N 18°32′18″E
- Country: Poland
- Voivodeship: Łódź
- County: Sieradz
- Gmina: Błaszki
- Population: 90

Chociszew [xɔˈt͡ɕiʂɛf] is a village in the administrative district of Gmina Błaszki, within Sieradz County, Łódź Voivodeship, in central Poland.
