= Wojków =

- Village
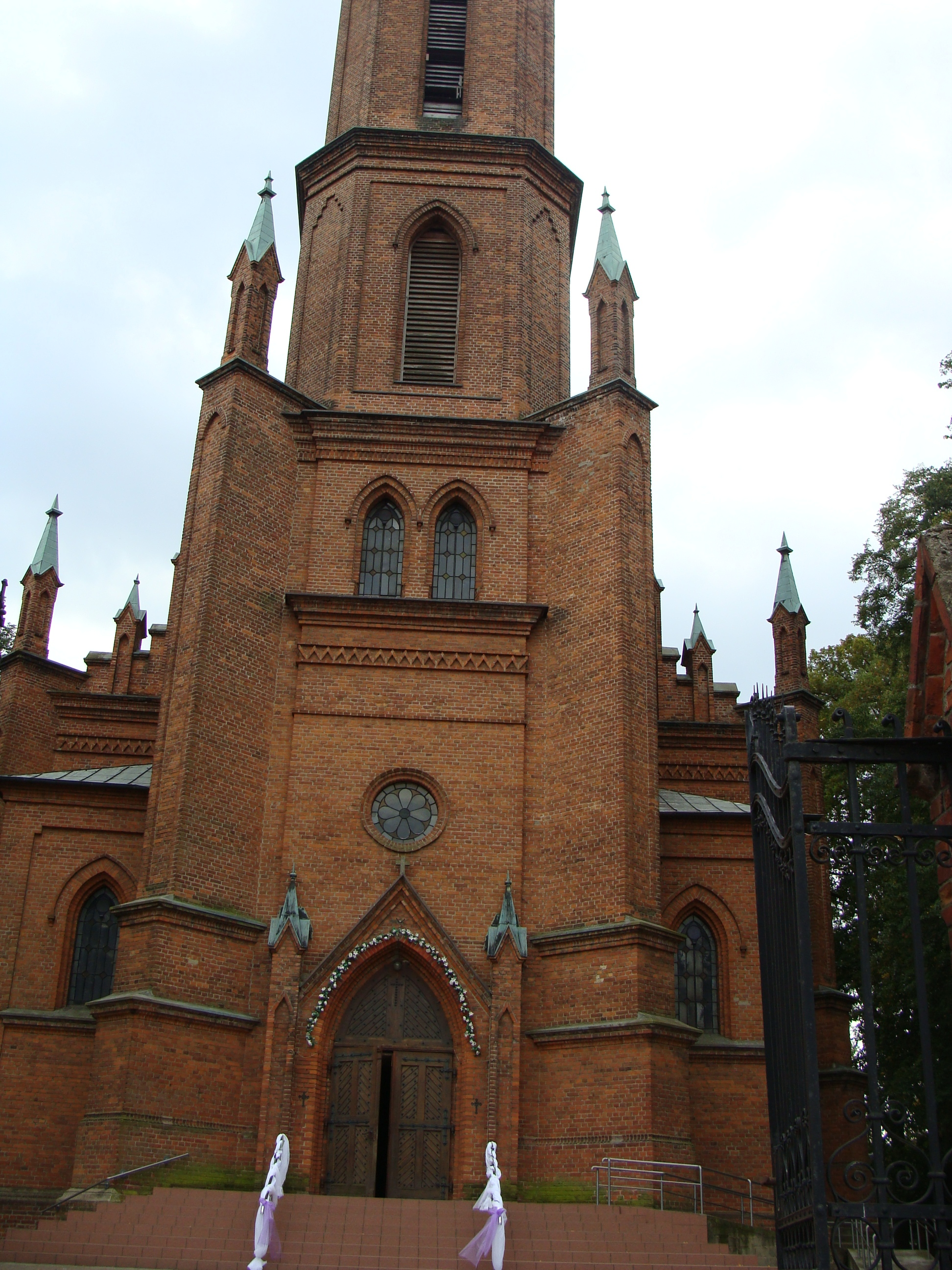
- Catholic church

- Location within Poland
- Coordinates: 51°35′22″N 18°25′51″E
- Country: Poland
- Voivodeship: Łódź
- County: Sieradz
- Gmina: Błaszki

Wojków [ˈvɔi̯kuf] is a village in the administrative district of Gmina Błaszki, within Sieradz County, Łódź Voivodeship, in central Poland.
