= Kamienna-Kolonia =

- Village
- Location within Poland
- Coordinates: 51°39′52″N 18°21′35″E
- Country: Poland
- Voivodeship: Łódź
- County: Sieradz
- Gmina: Błaszki

Kamienna-Kolonia [kaˈmjɛnna kɔˈlɔɲa] is a village in the administrative district of Gmina Błaszki, within Sieradz County, Łódź Voivodeship, in central Poland.
