= Kije, Sieradz County =

Kije
- Village
- Location within Poland
- Coordinates: 51°33′38″N 18°24′7″E
- Country: Poland
- Voivodeship: Łódź
- County: Sieradz
- Gmina: Błaszki

Kije [ˈkijɛ] is a village in the administrative district of Gmina Błaszki, within Sieradz County, Łódź Voivodeship, in central Poland.
