= Brończyn =

- Village
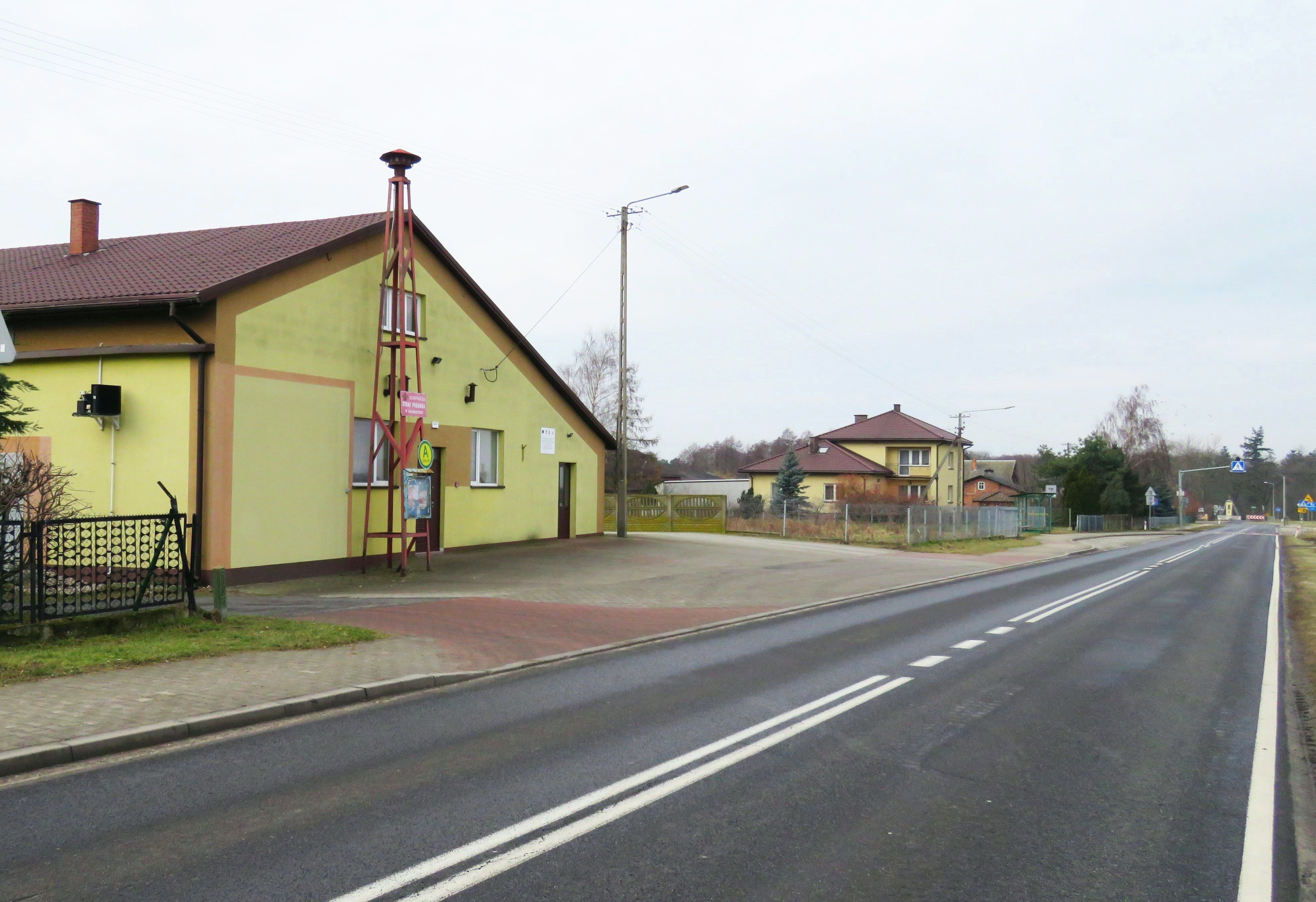

- Location within Poland
- Coordinates: 51°38′N 18°24′E
- Country: Poland
- Voivodeship: Łódź
- County: Sieradz
- Gmina: Błaszki

Brończyn [ˈbrɔɲt͡ʂɨn] is a village in the administrative district of Gmina Błaszki, within Sieradz County, Łódź Voivodeship, in central Poland.
