= Wójcice, Łódź Voivodeship =

Wójcice
- Village
- Location within Poland
- Coordinates: 51°40′N 18°26′E
- Country: Poland
- Voivodeship: Łódź
- County: Sieradz
- Gmina: Błaszki

Wójcice [vui̯ˈt͡ɕit͡sɛ] is a village in the administrative district of Gmina Błaszki, within Sieradz County, Łódź Voivodeship, in central Poland.
