= Maciszewice =

- Village
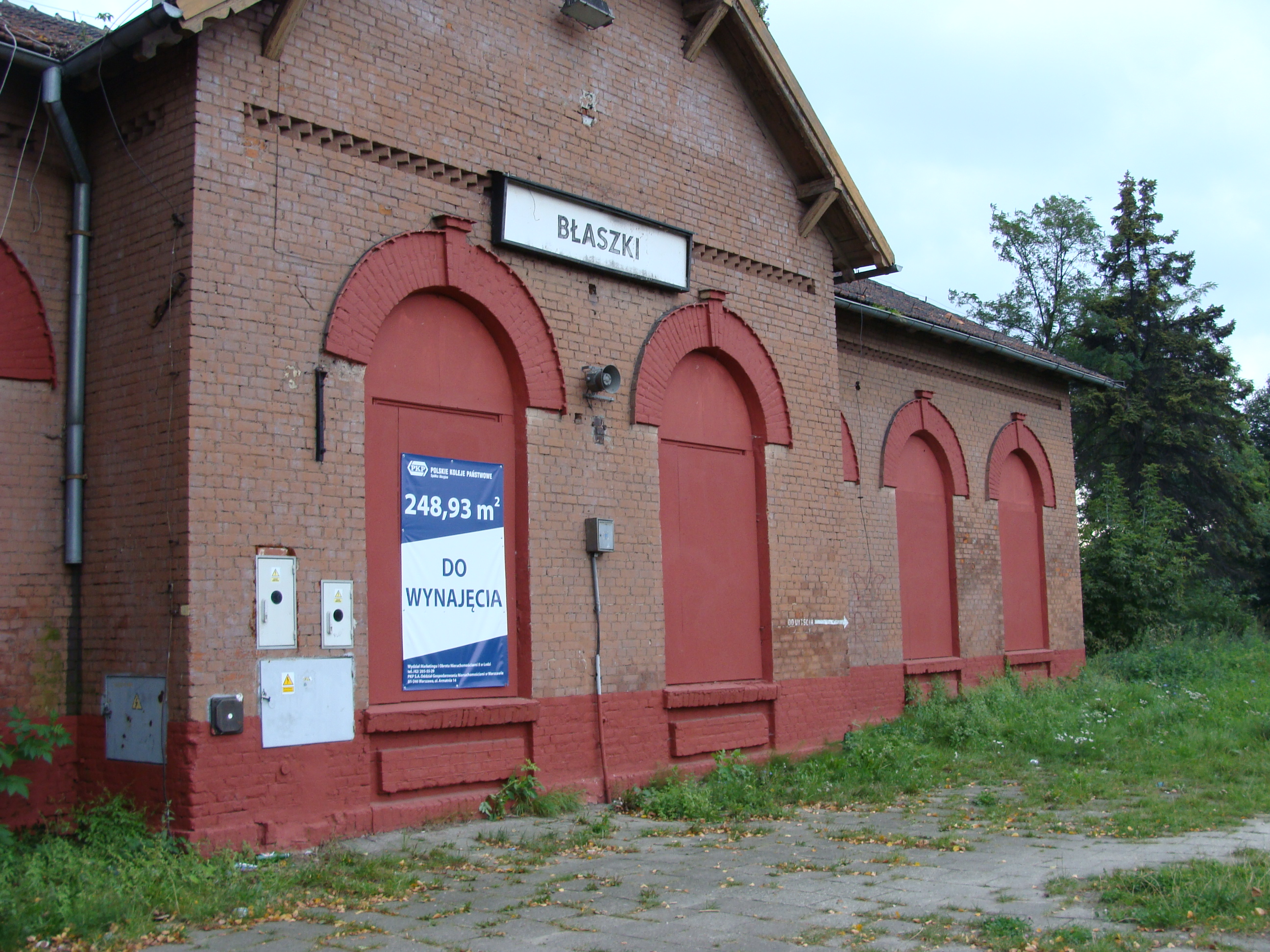
- Railway station

- Location within Poland
- Coordinates: 51°40′13″N 18°27′27″E
- Country: Poland
- Voivodeship: Łódź
- County: Sieradz
- Gmina: Błaszki

Maciszewice [mat͡ɕiʂɛˈvit͡sɛ] is a village in the administrative district of Gmina Błaszki, within Sieradz County, Łódź Voivodeship, in central Poland.
