= Korzenica, Łódź Voivodeship =

Korzenica
- Village
- Location within Poland
- Coordinates: 51°43′16″N 18°28′42″E
- Country: Poland
- Voivodeship: Łódź
- County: Sieradz
- Gmina: Błaszki

Korzenica [kɔʐɛˈnit͡sa] is a village in the administrative district of Gmina Błaszki, within Sieradz County, Łódź Voivodeship, in central Poland.
