= Suliszewice, Łódź Voivodeship =

Suliszewice
- Village
- Location within Poland
- Coordinates: 51°41′7″N 18°24′25″E
- Country: Poland
- Voivodeship: Łódź
- County: Sieradz
- Gmina: Błaszki

Suliszewice [suliʂɛˈvit͡sɛ] is a village in the administrative district of Gmina Błaszki, within Sieradz County, Łódź Voivodeship, in central Poland.
