= Garbów, Sieradz County =

Garbów
- Village
- Location within Poland
- Coordinates: 51°41′32″N 18°30′37″E
- Country: Poland
- Voivodeship: Łódź
- County: Sieradz
- Gmina: Błaszki

Garbów [ˈɡarbuf] is a village in the administrative district of Gmina Błaszki, within Sieradz County, Łódź Voivodeship, in central Poland.
