= Tuwalczew =

- Village
- Location within Poland
- Coordinates: 51°40′20″N 18°30′1″E
- Country: Poland
- Voivodeship: Łódź
- County: Sieradz
- Gmina: Błaszki
- Population: 90

Tuwalczew [tuˈvalt͡ʂɛf] is a village in the administrative district of Gmina Błaszki, within Sieradz County, Łódź Voivodeship, in central Poland.
