= Bukovina u Přelouče =

- Municipality
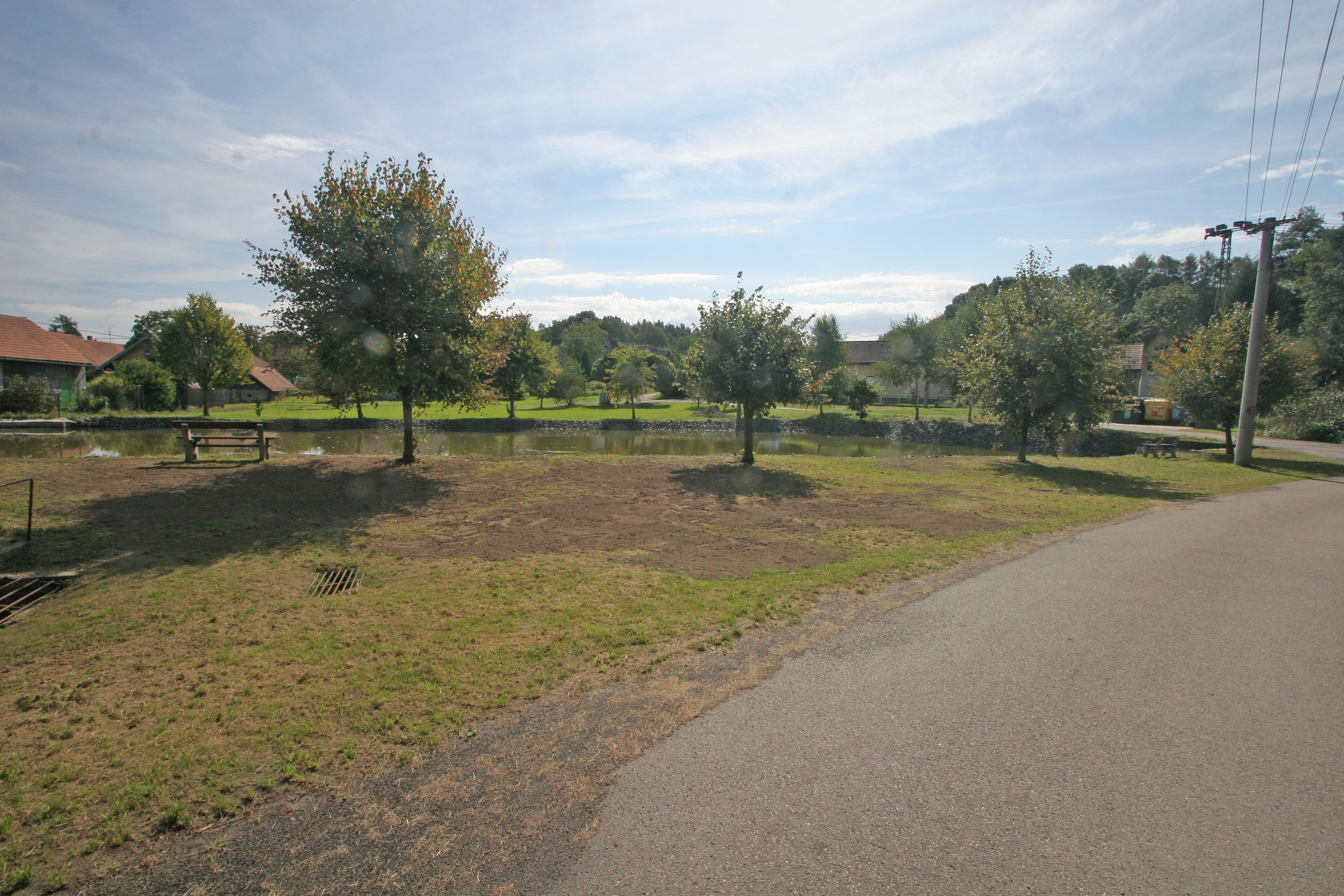
- Centre of Bukovina u Přelouče

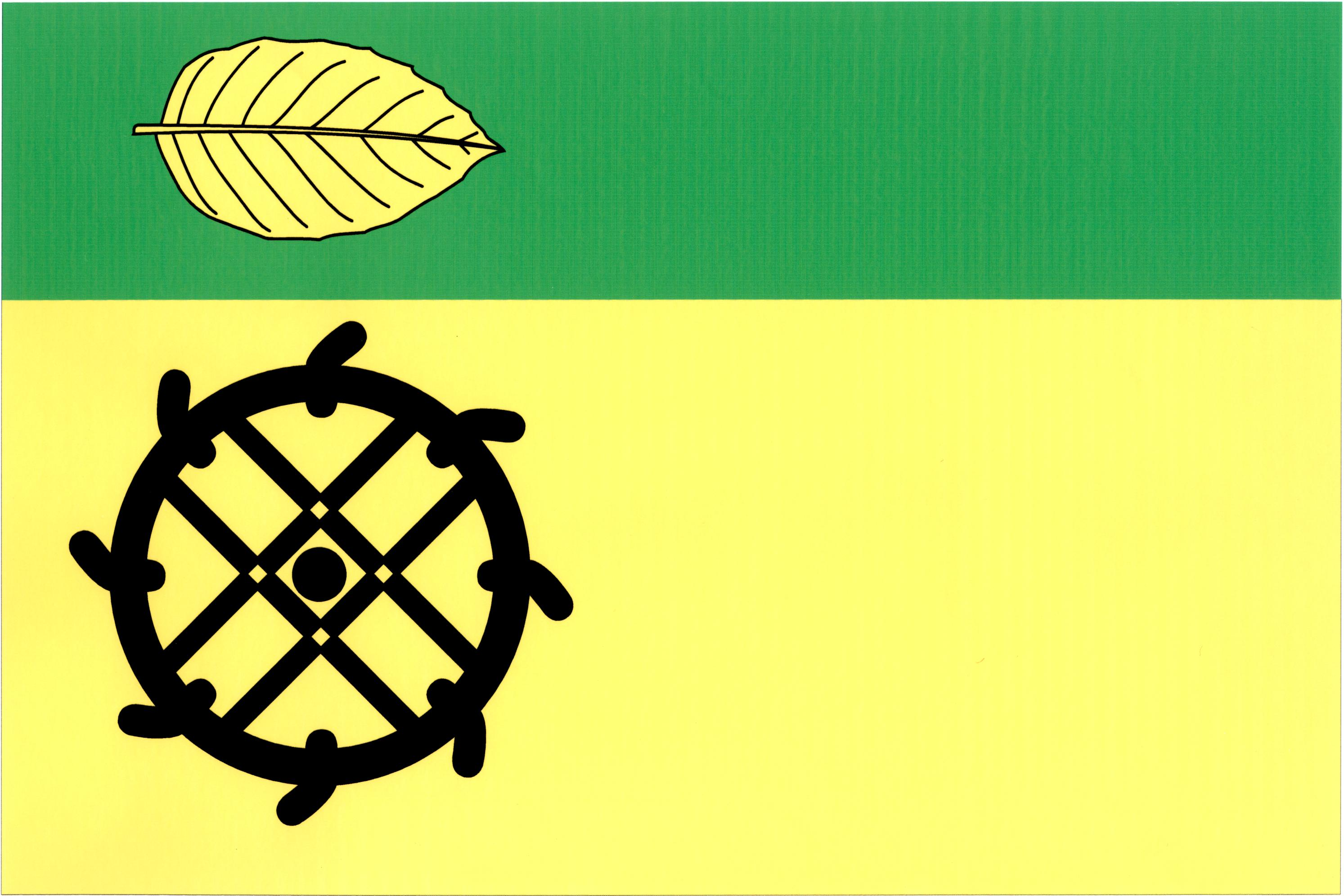
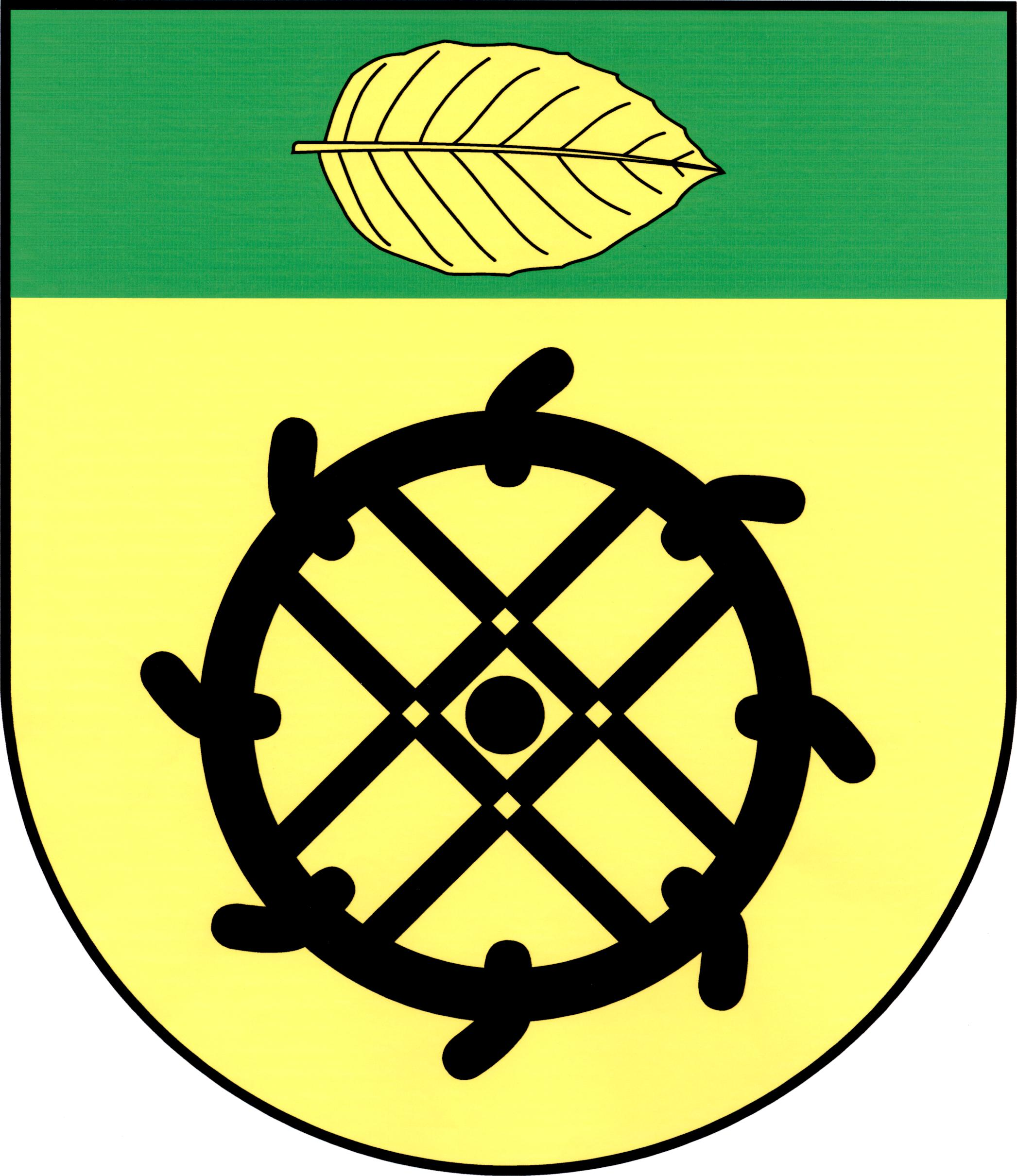
- Flag Coat of arms

- Location in the Czech Republic
- Coordinates: 49°56′54″N 15°33′47″E
- Country: Czech Republic
- Region: Pardubice
- District: Pardubice
- First mentioned: 1436

Area
  - Total: 1.71 km^{2} (0.66 sq mi)
- Elevation: 344 m (1,129 ft)

Population (2026-01-01)
  - Total: 89
  - Density: 52/km^{2} (130/sq mi)
- Time zone: UTC+1 (CET)
  - Summer (DST): UTC+2 (CEST)
- Postal code: 535 01
- Website: www.bukovinauprelouce.cz

Bukovina u Přelouče (until 1980 Bukovina) is a municipality and village in Pardubice District in the Pardubice Region of the Czech Republic. It has about 90 inhabitants.

== Etymology ==
The name Bukovina is derived from the Czech adjective buková (buk = 'beech'). It originally referred to some beech-covered hill or slope. Until 1980, the municipality was called just Bukovina. In 1980, it was renamed Bukovina u Přelouče ('Bukovina near Přelouč') to distinguish from other places with the same name.

== Demographics ==
Historical population
Year	Pop.	±%
1869	214	—
1880	187	−12.6%
1890	205	+9.6%
1900	185	−9.8%
1910	169	−8.6%
1921	162	−4.1%
1930	148	−8.6%
1950	105	−29.1%
1961	109	+3.8%
1970	90	−17.4%
1980	78	−13.3%
1991	69	−11.5%
2001	71	+2.9%
2011	69	−2.8%
2021	88	+27.5%
Source: Censuses
