= Bukovina u Čisté =

- Municipality
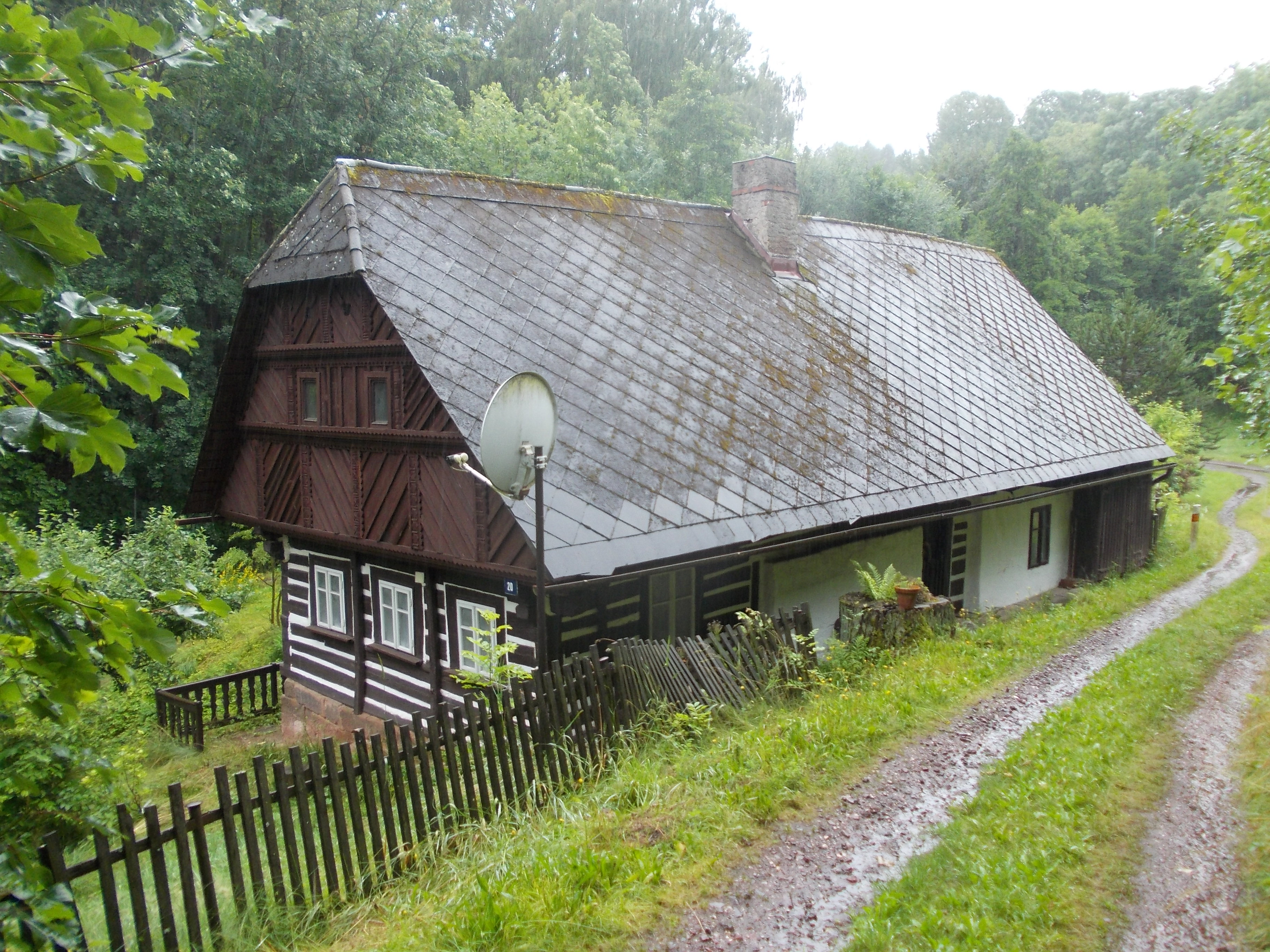
- House no. 20

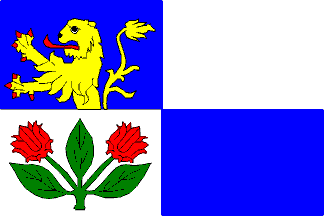
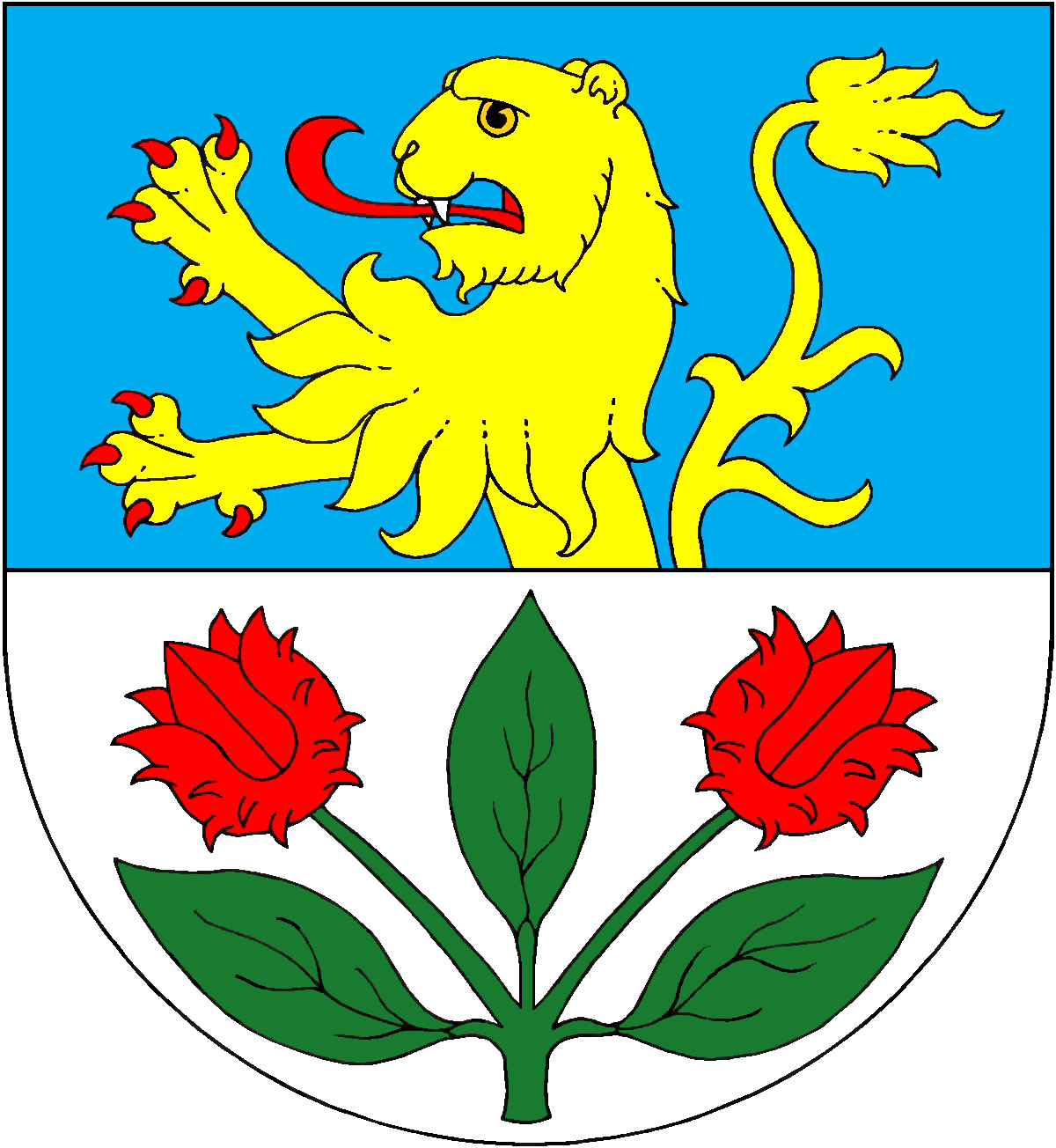
- Flag Coat of arms

- Location in the Czech Republic
- Coordinates: 50°32′42″N 15°7′9″E
- Country: Czech Republic
- Region: Liberec
- District: Semily
- First mentioned: 1386

Area
  - Total: 3.17 km^{2} (1.22 sq mi)
- Elevation: 433 m (1,421 ft)

Population (2026-01-01)
  - Total: 206
  - Density: 65.0/km^{2} (168/sq mi)
- Time zone: UTC+1 (CET)
  - Summer (DST): UTC+2 (CEST)
- Postal code: 514 01
- Website: bukovina.cz

Bukovina u Čisté is a municipality and village in Semily District in the Liberec Region of the Czech Republic. It has about 200 inhabitants.

== Etymology ==
The name Bukovina is derived from the Czech adjective buková (buk = 'beech'). It originally referred to some beech-covered hill or slope.

== Geography ==
Bukovina u Čisté is located about 19 kilometres (12 mi) east of Semily and 43 km (27 mi) southeast of Liberec. It lies in a hilly landscape in the Giant Mountains Foothills. The highest point is at 590 m (1,936 ft) above sea level.

== History ==
The first written mention of Bukovina is from 1386. The village was then known under the name Bukovinka. In 1628, Albrecht von Wallenstein acquired Bukovina from Karel Kapoun of Svojkov. He also purchased other manors in the surrounding area and together they were later attached to his Hostinné estate. However, Wallenstein was assassinated in Cheb in 1634 and his vast properties were confiscated.

Over the years, Bukovina had many owners, but in 1850 it became an independent municipality. In 1873, the settlement Karlov was founded by Karel of Morzin and came under administration of Čistá. In 1927, the settlement merged with Hájenka hamlet and nine houses in Čistá, and they were joined to Bukovina. This enlarged municipality became known as Bukovina u Čisté.

== Demographics ==
Historical population

Year	Pop.	±%
1869	440	—
1880	433	−1.6%
1890	454	+4.8%
1900	457	+0.7%
1910	444	−2.8%

Year	Pop.	±%
1921	383	−13.7%
1930	373	−2.6%
1950	218	−41.6%
1961	201	−7.8%
1970	181	−10.0%

Year	Pop.	±%
1980	193	+6.6%
1991	189	−2.1%
2001	182	−3.7%
2011	186	+2.2%
2021	202	+8.6%

Source: Censuses

== Transport ==
There are no railways or major roads passing through the municipality.

== Sights ==
The only protected cultural monuments are the well-preserved timbered house No. 20, which was built in 1834, and a statue of St. John of Nepomuk from 1776.
