= Bucovina (band) =

Romanian folk metal band

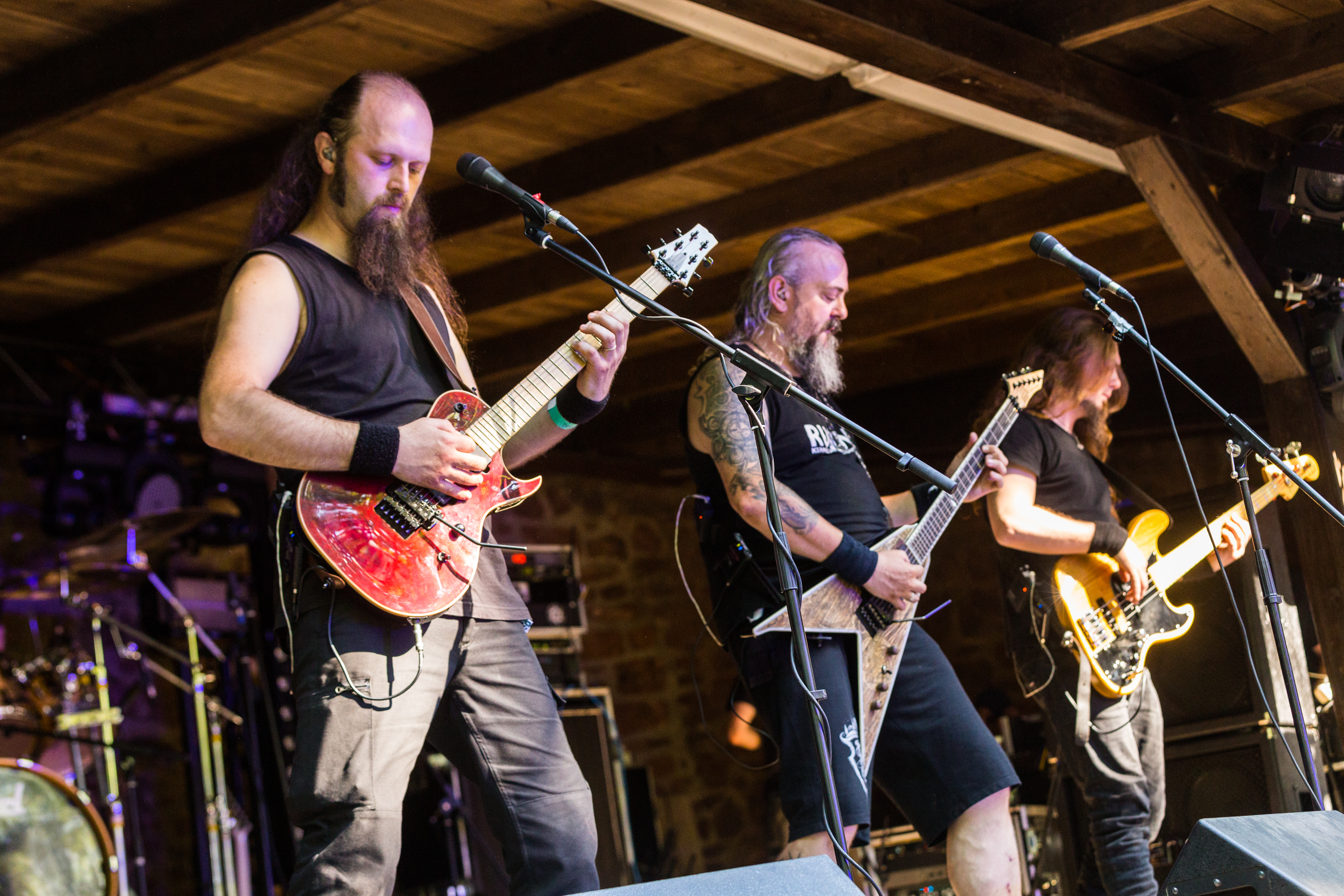
- Bucovina performing at Dark Troll Open Air in 2017

Background information
- Origin: Iași, Romania
- Genres: folk metal; black metal; heavy metal; hard rock
- Years active: 2000–present
- Members: Florin "Crivăț" Țibu; Bogdan "Vifor" Mihu; Bogdan Luparu; Jorge Augusto Coan

Bucovina is a Romanian folk metal band formed in Iași in 2000. Since its inception, Bucovina has released four full-length studio albums and one extended play, all of them featuring constant members Florin "Crivăț" Țibu, Bogdan Luparu (both on electric guitar and vocals) and Bogdan "Vifor" Mihu (on drums). Named after the historical region situated in Northern Romania, Bucovina is known for incorporating folkloric elements both in their music and lyrics.

== Members ==
Current

- Florin "Crivăț" Țibu – electric guitar, vocals (2000–present)
- Bogdan Luparu – electric guitar, vocals (2001–present)
- Bogdan "Vifor" Mihu – drums (2000–present)
- Jorge Augusto Coan – bass guitar (2013–present)

Former

- Paolo Cito Caminha – bass guitar (2002–2006)
- Augustin Abiței – bass guitar (2002–2002)
- Tudor "Beks" Murariu – bass guitar (2006–2010)
- Manuel "Maanu" Giugula – keyboards (2008–2013)
- Vlad Ștefan Datcu – bass guitar (2010–2013)

== Discography ==
Studio albums

- Ceasul aducerii-aminte (2006)
- Sub stele (2013)
- Nestrămutat (2015)
- Septentrion (2018)
- Suntem Aici (2022)

EPs

- Duh (2010)
