= Bukovina nad Labem =

- Municipality
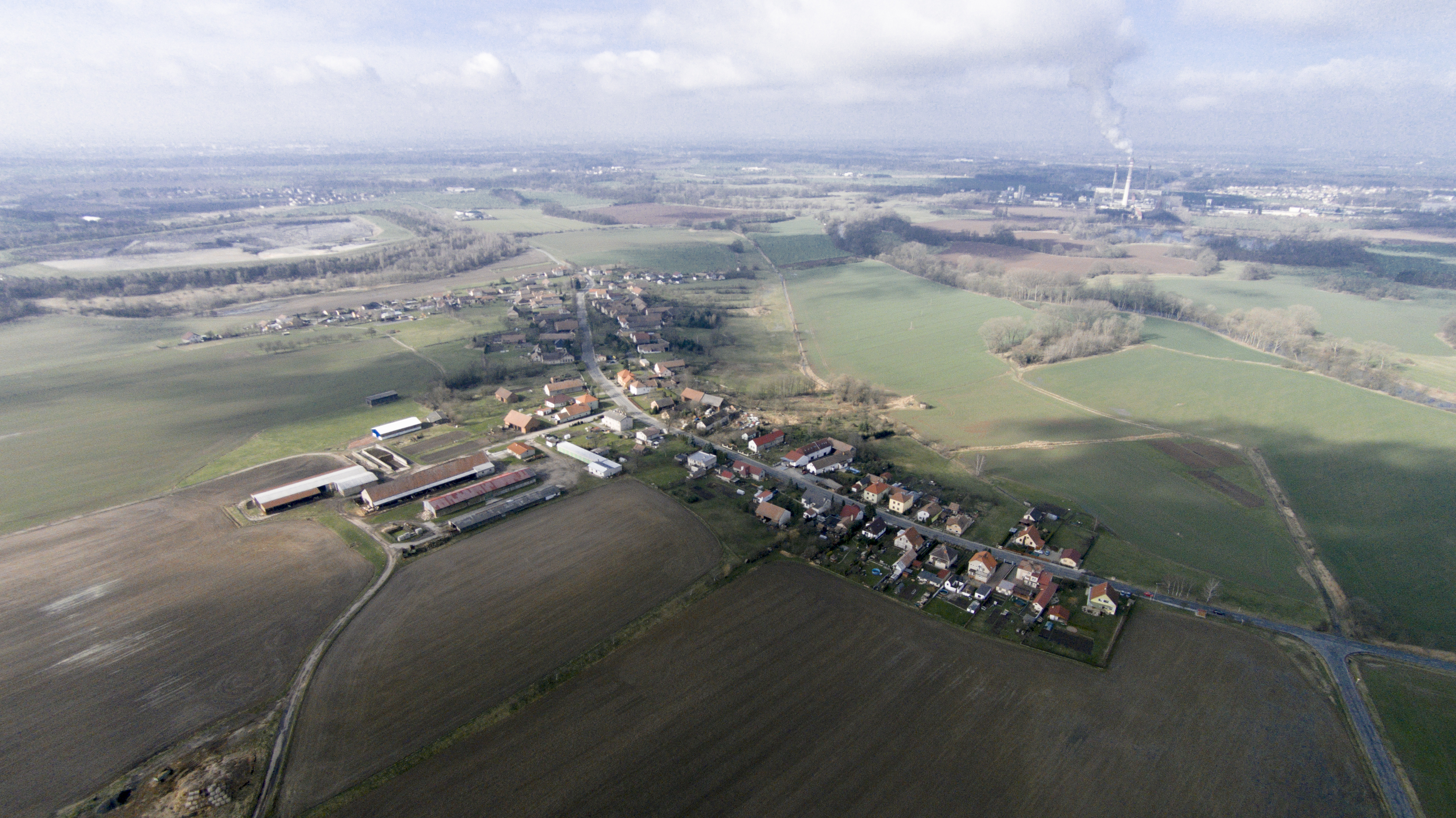
- Aerial view

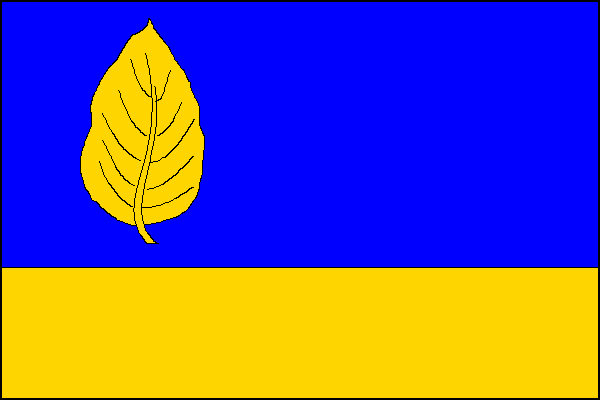
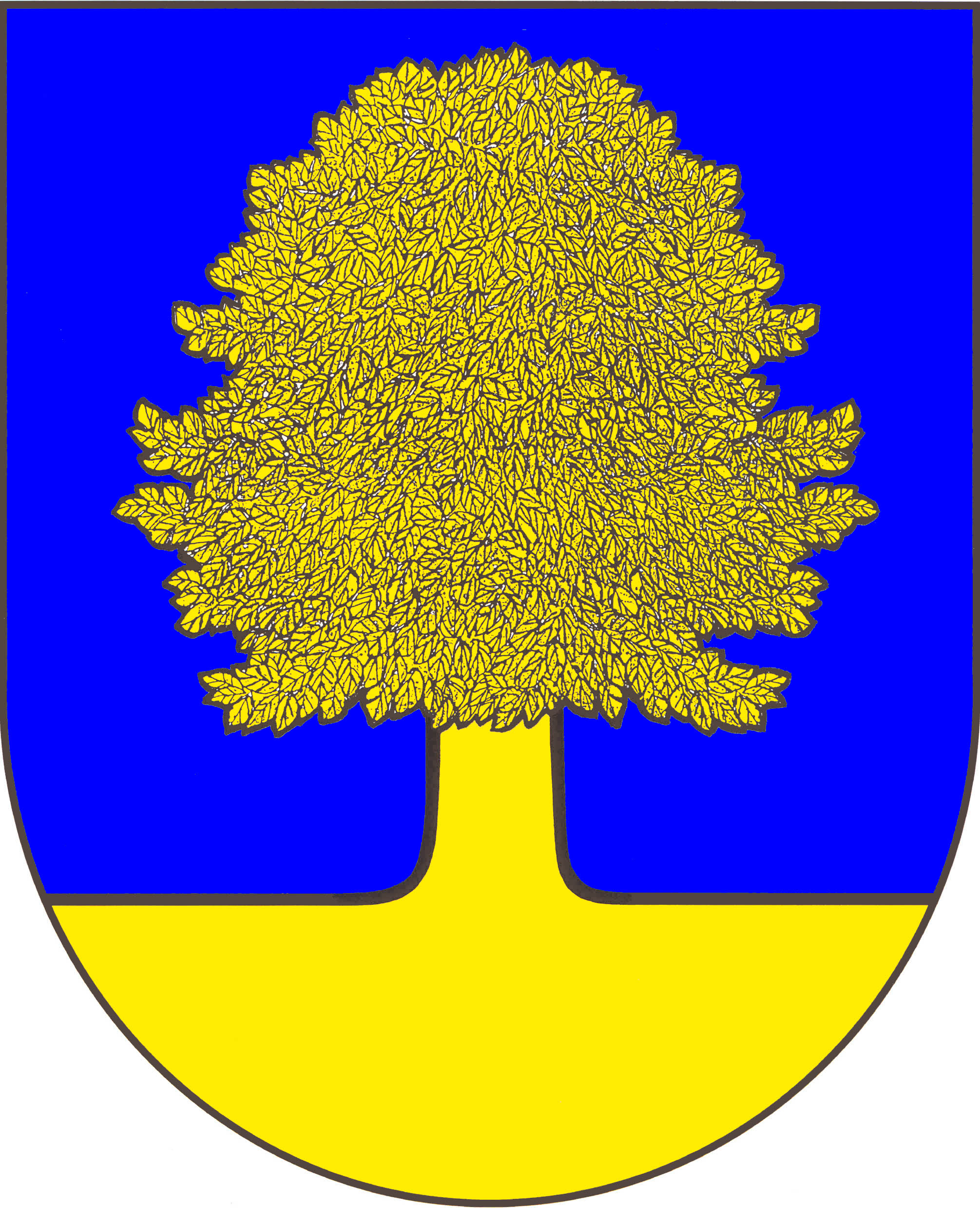
- Flag Coat of arms

- Location in the Czech Republic
- Coordinates: 50°7′30″N 15°49′24″E
- Country: Czech Republic
- Region: Pardubice
- District: Pardubice
- First mentioned: 1340

Area
  - Total: 4.46 km^{2} (1.72 sq mi)
- Elevation: 240 m (790 ft)

Population (2026-01-01)
  - Total: 239
  - Density: 53.6/km^{2} (139/sq mi)
- Time zone: UTC+1 (CET)
  - Summer (DST): UTC+2 (CEST)
- Postal code: 533 52
- Website: www.bukovinanl.eu

Bukovina nad Labem (until 1980 Bukovina) is a municipality and village in Pardubice District in the Pardubice Region of the Czech Republic. It has about 200 inhabitants.

== Etymology ==
The name Bukovina is derived from the Czech adjective buková (buk = 'beech'). It originally referred to some beech-covered hill or slope. Until 1980, the municipality was called just Bukovina. In 1980, it was renamed Bukovina nad Labem ('Bukovina upon the Elbe') to distinguish from other places with the same name.

== Demographics ==
Historical population
Year	Pop.	±%
1869	328	—
1880	330	+0.6%
1890	319	−3.3%
1900	316	−0.9%
1910	290	−8.2%
1921	296	+2.1%
1930	300	+1.4%
1950	249	−17.0%
1961	232	−6.8%
1970	234	+0.9%
1980	230	−1.7%
1991	208	−9.6%
2001	215	+3.4%
2011	231	+7.4%
2021	240	+3.9%
Source: Censuses
