= Sarny, Łódź Voivodeship =

Sarny
- Village
- Location within Poland
- Coordinates: 51°37′8″N 18°27′43″E
- Country: Poland
- Voivodeship: Łódź
- County: Sieradz
- Gmina: Błaszki

Sarny [ˈsarnɨ] is a village in the administrative district of Gmina Błaszki, within Sieradz County, Łódź Voivodeship, in central Poland.
