= Brudzew, Łódź Voivodeship =

Brudzew
- Village
- Location within Poland
- Coordinates: 51°36′51″N 18°30′43″E
- Country: Poland
- Voivodeship: Łódź
- County: Sieradz
- Gmina: Błaszki

Brudzew [ˈbrud͡zɛf] is a village in the administrative district of Gmina Błaszki, within Sieradz County, Łódź Voivodeship, in central Poland.
