= Černilov =

- Municipality
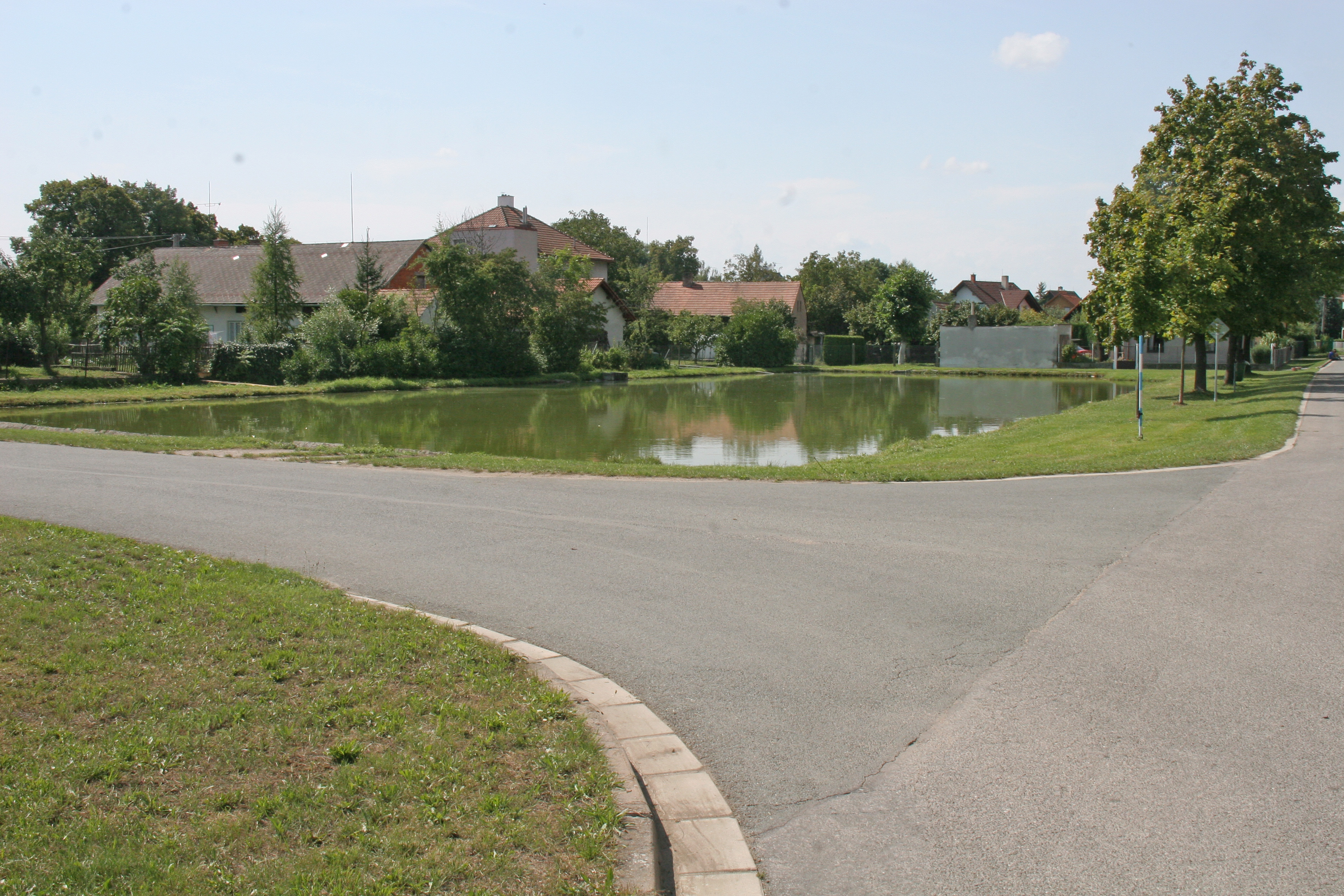
- Centre of Černilov

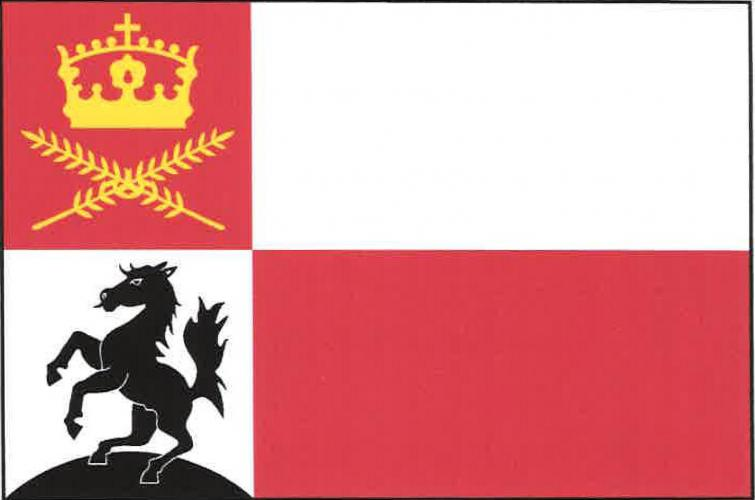
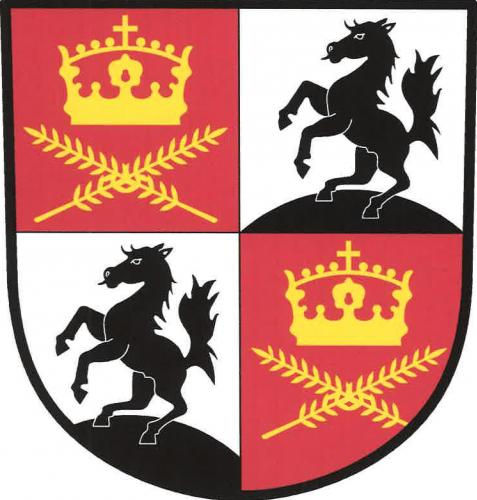
- Flag Coat of arms

- Location in the Czech Republic
- Coordinates: 50°15′45″N 15°55′25″E
- Country: Czech Republic
- Region: Hradec Králové
- District: Hradec Králové
- First mentioned: 1271

Area
  - Total: 25.71 km^{2} (9.93 sq mi)
- Elevation: 253 m (830 ft)

Population (2026-01-01)
  - Total: 2,488
  - Density: 96.77/km^{2} (250.6/sq mi)
- Time zone: UTC+1 (CET)
  - Summer (DST): UTC+2 (CEST)
- Postal codes: 500 03, 503 03, 503 43, 503 46
- Website: www.cernilov.cz

Černilov is a municipality and village in Hradec Králové District in the Hradec Králové Region of the Czech Republic. It has about 2,500 inhabitants.

== Administrative division ==
Černilov consists of three municipal parts (in brackets population according to the 2021 census):

- Černilov (1,885)
- Bukovina (163)
- Újezd (216)

== Etymology ==
The initial name of the village was Črnielov. It was derived from the surname Črniel, meaning "Črniel's (court)". From the 14th century, the name appears in the current form.

== Geography ==
Černilov is located about 7 kilometres (4 mi) northeast of Hradec Králové. It lies in an agricultural landscape of the Orlice Table. The highest point is at 287 m (942 ft) above sea level. The village is situated along the stream Černilovský potok, which originates here.

== History ==
The first written mention of Černilov is from 1271. The village was founded on an old trade route.

== Demographics ==
Historical population

Year	Pop.	±%
1869	2,478	—
1880	2,765	+11.6%
1890	2,767	+0.1%
1900	2,664	−3.7%
1910	2,682	+0.7%

Year	Pop.	±%
1921	2,507	−6.5%
1930	2,520	+0.5%
1950	1,825	−27.6%
1961	1,799	−1.4%
1970	1,736	−3.5%

Year	Pop.	±%
1980	1,815	+4.6%
1991	1,902	+4.8%
2001	2,169	+14.0%
2011	2,387	+10.1%
2021	2,264	−5.2%

Source: Censuses

== Transport ==
There are no railways or major roads passing through the municipality.

== Sights ==
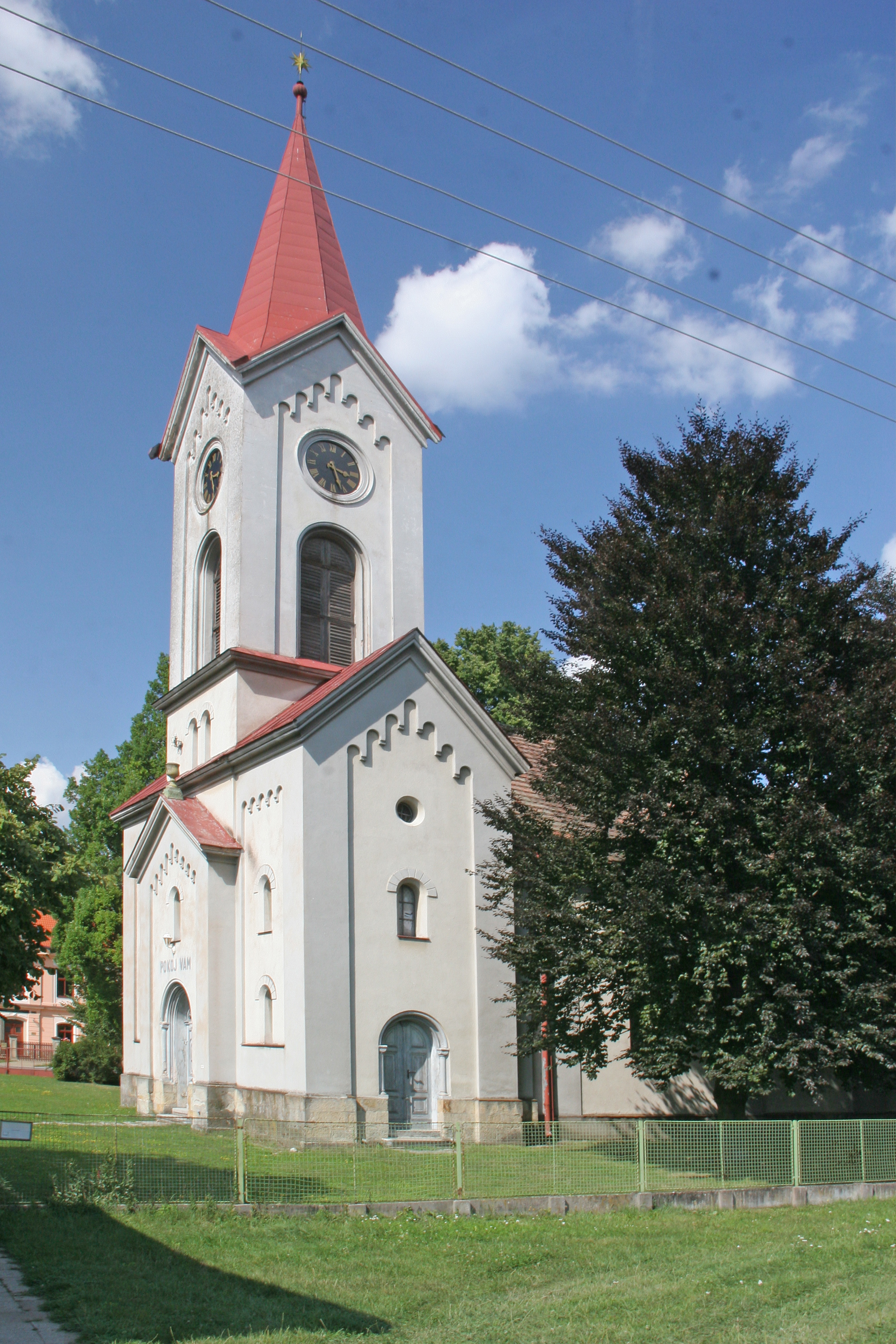
Evangelical church

The main landmarks of Černilov are the three churches: the Catholic Church of the Finding of Saint Stephen, the Evangelical church and the former Evangelical church, which now serves as the municipal and ceremonial hall. However, none of them is considered a cultural monument.

Among the protected cultural monuments in the municipality are the Neo-Renaissance former Protestant primary school from 1864, a statue of St. John of Nepomuk from 1726, a statue of St. Florian from the end of the 18th century, and six Neoclassical rural homesteads from the 19th century.

A tourist destination is the Dutch-type mill, built in 2016. It houses an art gallery and an educational space designed for meetings.
