= Vítězná =

- Municipality
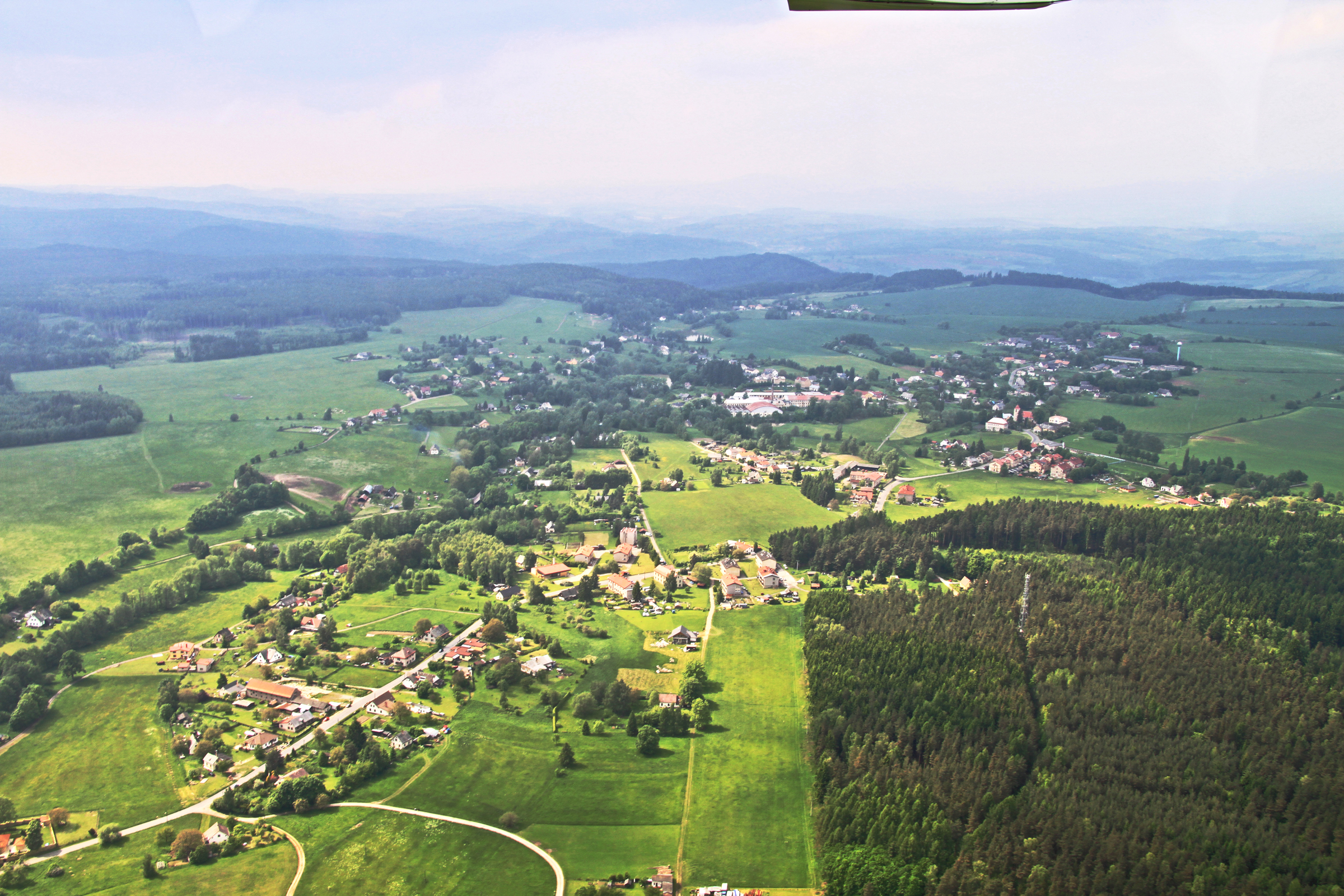
- Aerial view of the village of Kocléřov

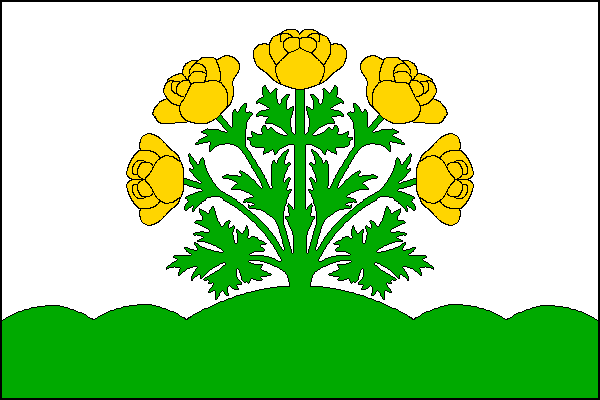
- Flag Coat of arms

- Location in the Czech Republic
- Coordinates: 50°29′15″N 15°48′0″E
- Country: Czech Republic
- Region: Hradec Králové
- District: Trutnov
- First mentioned: 1360

Area
  - Total: 24.75 km^{2} (9.56 sq mi)
- Elevation: 498 m (1,634 ft)

Population (2026-01-01)
  - Total: 1,498
  - Density: 60.53/km^{2} (156.8/sq mi)
- Time zone: UTC+1 (CET)
  - Summer (DST): UTC+2 (CEST)
- Postal code: 544 01, 544 62
- Website: www.vitezna.cz

Vítězná is a municipality in Trutnov District in the Hradec Králové Region of the Czech Republic. It has about 1,500 inhabitants.

== Administrative division ==
Vítězná consists of seven municipal parts (in brackets population according to the 2021 census):

- Bukovina (24)
- Hájemství (37)
- Huntířov (529)
- Kocléřov (580)
- Komárov (247)
- Nové Záboří (9)
- Záboří (31)

== Etymology ==
The name means 'victorious' in Czech.

== Geography ==
Vítězná is located about 11 kilometres (7 mi) southwest of Trutnov and 31 km (19 mi) north of Hradec Králové. It lies in the Giant Mountains Foothills. The highest point is the hill Smrk at 584 m (1,916 ft) above sea level. The eastern municipal border is briefly formed by the Elbe River. The area is rich in small brooks, the longest of which is the Hartský potok. The built-up area is mainly situated along its tributary, Huntířovský potok.

== History ==
The oldest part of the municipality is Kocléřov which was probably founded at the beginning of the 14th century. The first written mention of Kocléřov is from 1360, when a fortress stood there. Huntířov was first mentioned in 1384. The first settlers in the area were Germans who formed the majority here until World War II. In 1945, the German-speaking inhabitants were expelled.

In 1961, the municipalities of Hájemství, Huntířov (including the village of Bukovina), Kocléřov, Komárov and Záboří (including the village of Nové Záboří) were merged to form the current municipality.

== Demographics ==
Historical population

Year	Pop.	±%
1869	4,362	—
1880	4,455	+2.1%
1890	4,367	−2.0%
1900	4,183	−4.2%
1910	3,862	−7.7%

Year	Pop.	±%
1921	3,331	−13.7%
1930	3,380	+1.5%
1950	1,853	−45.2%
1961	1,763	−4.9%
1970	1,603	−9.1%

Year	Pop.	±%
1980	1,461	−8.9%
1991	1,334	−8.7%
2001	1,325	−0.7%
2011	1,346	+1.6%
2021	1,457	+8.2%

Source: Censuses

== Transport ==
There are no railways or major roads running through the municipality.

== Sights ==
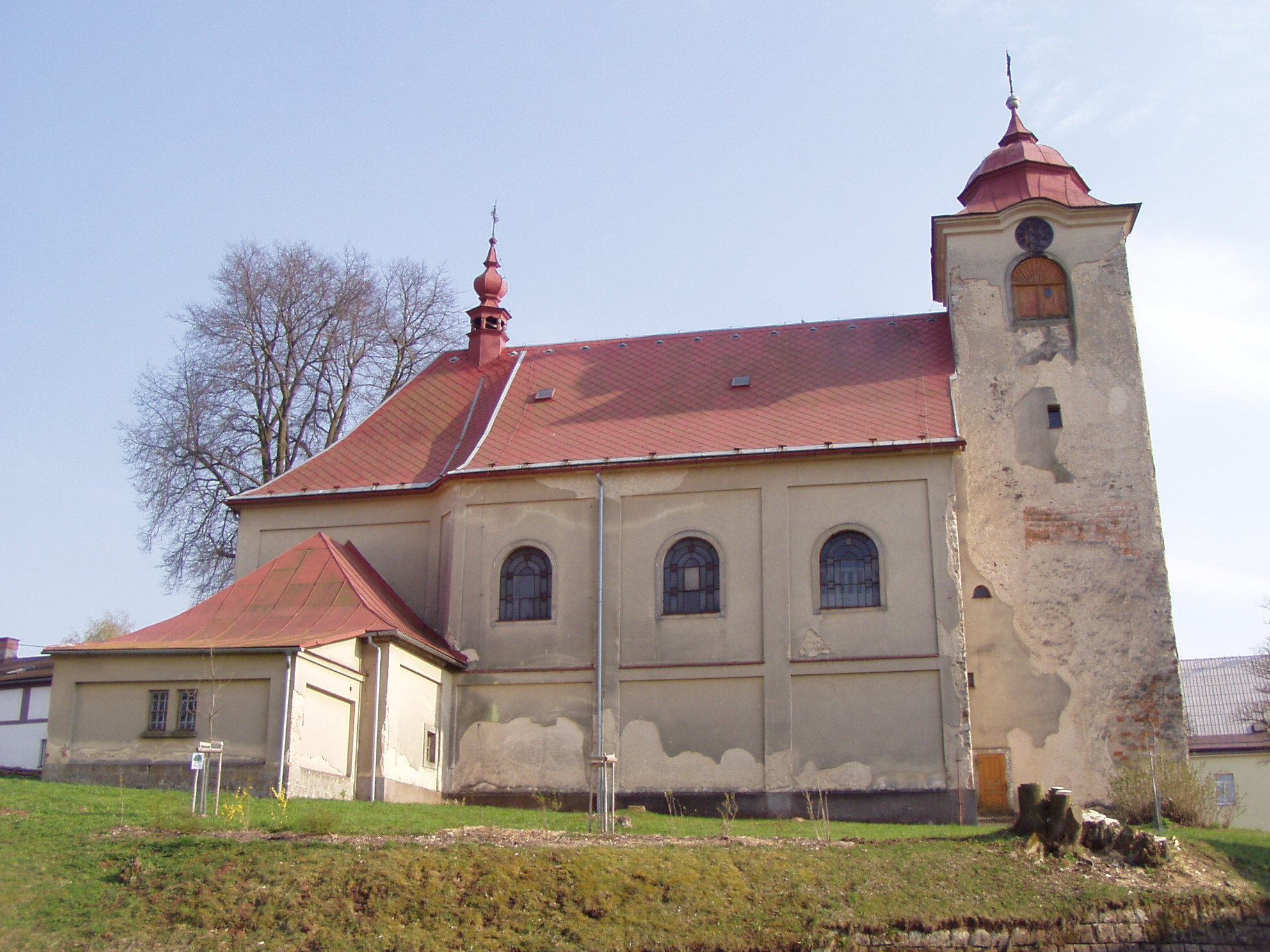
Church of Saint Wenceslaus

The most important monument is the Church of Saint Wenceslaus in Kocléřov. It was built in the Baroque style in 1720 and rebuilt in 1807. It was built on the site of an old Gothic church from the 14th century.

A tourist destination is the pilgrimage site U Studánky. It is located in the woods between Kocléřov and Hájemství. The site is linked to the legend of a miraculous spring that restored sight to a blind woman in 1848. First, chapels were built here and later they were replaced by the current Church of the Visitation of the Virgin Mary, built in the Neo-Romanesque style.
