= Bukovinian Romanian dialect =

Dialect of the Romanian language

Bukovinian Romanian
- Graiul bucovinean
- Native to: Romania, Ukraine
- Region: Bukovina
- Language family: Indo-European: Italic; Latino-Faliscan; Latin; Romance; Eastern Romance; Romanian; Bukovinian Romanian
- Early forms: Old Latin: Vulgar Latin; Proto-Romance; Common Romanian
- Dialects: Dornean; Câmpulungean; Rădăuțean; Southeast; Eastern

Language codes
- ISO 639-3: –
- Linguasphere: 51-AAD-cj
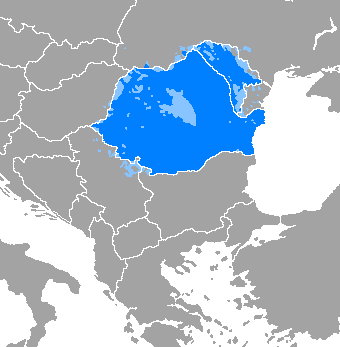
- Distribution of the Romanian language in Romania, Moldova and surroundings.

Bukovinian Romanian is a branch of the Romanian language spoken in Bukovina and which has influences of both Moldavian, Transylvanian, and Maramureș. It also features the presence of numerous German and Ruthenian loanwords which were introduced into the dialect while Bukovina was a province of the Austrian Empire (1774–1918). Due to the language policy promoted by the Austrian monarchy, several languages were spoken in Bukovina: Ukrainian, Romanian, Polish, German (Buchenländisch), and Yiddish. Today, the Bukovinian dialect is being replaced by the standard Romanian language, especially in the urban areas of southern Bukovina, while the language in northern Bukovina is being replaced by Ukrainian.

== Subdivisions ==
The Bukovinian dialect of the Romanian language can be divided into five more subdialects, with a different specificity and a more or less controversial individuality:

=== Dornean dialect ===
The Dornean was formed as a bar of transition in the 17th and 18th centuries and is spoken in the area of the former judicial district of Vatra Dornei. The most obvious phonetic differences in relation to the Transylvanian language are achieved not by the distinctive features of sounds, but by the speed of speech and by the prosodic elements. In contrast to the slower speaking and high general tone of the (northeast) Transylvanian, the Bukovinian pronunciation is characterized by a faster pace and higher variations in height and intensity; the dynamic emphasis emphasizes the tonic syllables more strongly, but compensates for the short aphonized speech and even the fall of the non-accentuated syllables.

=== Câmpulungean dialect ===
The dialect is the most archaic and at the same time the most striking individuality. With its center in Câmpulung, it extends along the River Moldova, from Fundu Moldovei to Gura Humorului, with branches on the valley of Moldovița: Frumosu and Vatra Moldoviței, and from here on Obcina Mare to Sucevița, and on the Suhei Valley in Bukovina: Stulpicani and Ostra villages.

=== Rădăuțean dialect ===
The Rădăuțean dialect assimilated various Transylvanian influences by due to the significant number of Transylvanian speakers emigrating there in the eighteenth century. It was influenced by phonetic pronunciations specific to Maramureș, northeastern Transylvania, Crișana, northern Banat and southwest Transylvania. The dialect area includes, besides the area between Falcău (in the West), Siret (in the East) and Solca (in the South) and the localities inhabited by Romanians in the Storojineț area (in the North).

=== Southeast Bukovinian ===
The area of southeast Bukovina, sometimes referred to as "africatizantă" after the specific phonetic phenomenon, was formed in the 18th century by the overlapping of the Transylvanian influences over an archaic dialect. The dialect area covers Gura Humorului (to the West) and Chilișeni (to the East), Iaslovăț (to the North), the southern limit being the border of the historical Bukovina (Valea Moldovei, Stănești, Băișesti, Brăiești, Drăgoiești, Măzănești, Lucăcești, Vorniceni, Liteni, Bunești, Securiceni, Plăvălari, Udești, Poieni-Suceava, and Chilișeni). In the east of this dialect area there are linguistic islands where the archaic language was preserved until the settlement of the Transylvanians, showing the remnants of the Câmpulungean dialect that was predominant until the settlement of the Transylvanians in the 17th–18th centuries.

=== Eastern Bukovinian ===
The dialect is spread over Eastern Bukovina, which includes localities on the eastern border of historical Bukovina. The dialect preserved linguistic peculiarities are when it was separated by the settlement of Transylvanians in the 17th–18th centuries. From this area belong the localities around Suceava: Bosanci (and the villages later detached from Moara Nica, Moara Carp, Frumoasa, Vlădichii Mill, Bulai, and Podeni), Tișăuți, Lisaura, Mihoveni, Costâna, continuing with the former border towns Mitocu Dragomirnei, Pălărați, Calafindești (where the elements from Rădăuțean), Sinauți de Sus, Stănești, Poieni-Bucovina, Țureni, came to Cernăuți: the villages of Plaiul Cosminului, Voloca on Derelui, Ostrița, Mahala, Boian and Lehăceni-Boian. This subdialect of the Bukovinian is also spoken by the descendants of the Romanian immigrants to Boian, Alberta, Canada, at the end of the 19th century.

== See also ==
- Romanian phonology
