= Golków =

- Village
- Location within Poland
- Coordinates: 51°41′45″N 18°26′47″E
- Country: Poland
- Voivodeship: Łódź
- County: Sieradz
- Gmina: Błaszki
- Population: 100

Golków [ˈɡɔlkuf] is a village that is located in the administrative district of Gmina Błaszki, within Sieradz County, Łódź Voivodeship, in central Poland.
