= Theft of The Taking of Christ (Odesa) =

2008 theft of a painting from an art museum in Ukraine

The Taking of Christ
- Presa di Cristo nell'orto or Cattura di Cristo
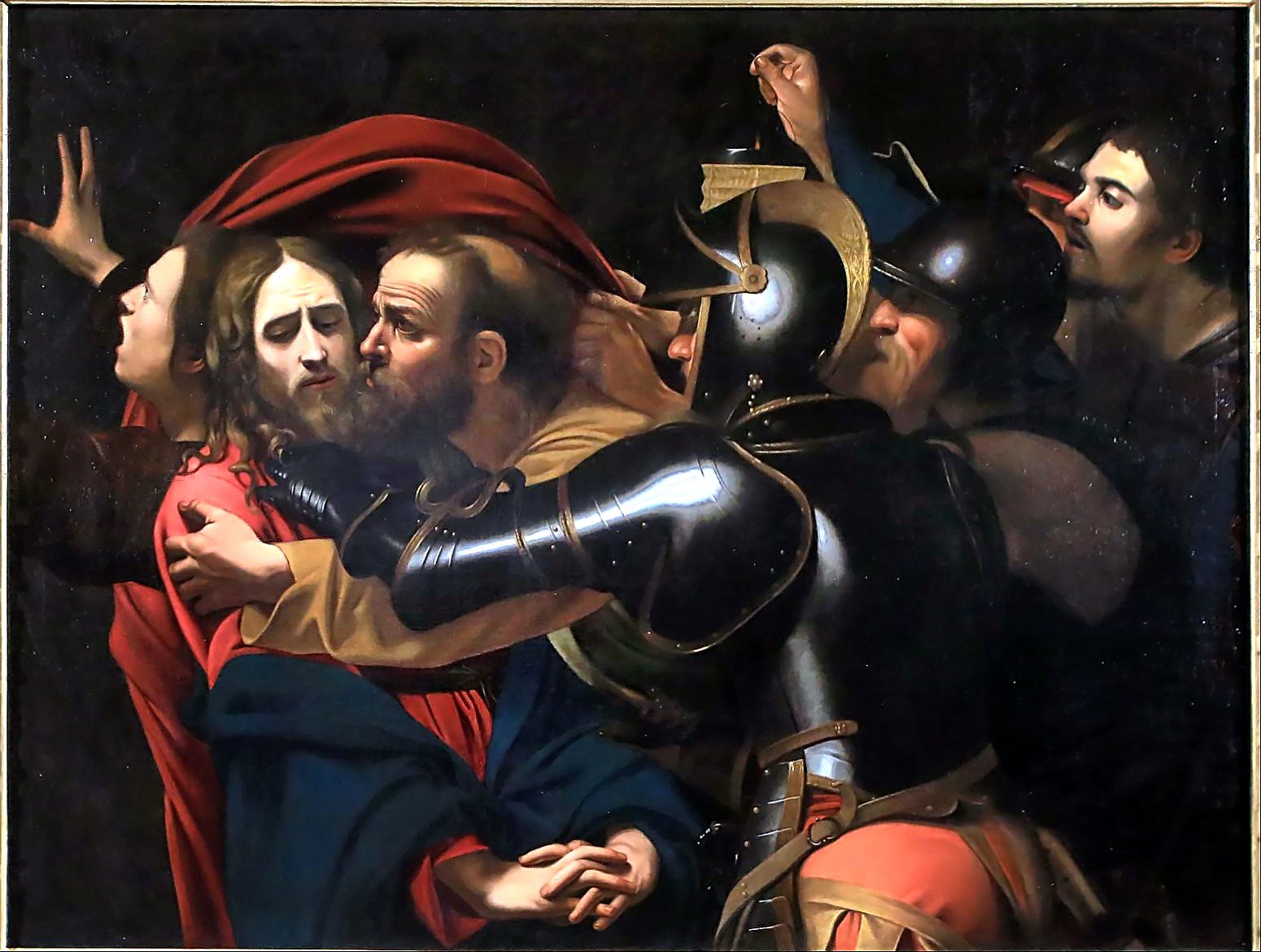
- Restored painting exhibited at the Saint Sophia of Kyiv in 2026
- Artist: Traditionally attributed to Caravaggio
- Year: Early 17th century
- Medium: Oil on canvas
- Dimensions: 134 × 172.5 cm
- Location: Odesa Museum of Western and Eastern Art, Odesa, Ukraine

The theft of The Taking of Christ (Odesa) was an art theft that occurred on the night of 30–31 July 2008, when The Taking of Christ, a painting attributed at the time to Caravaggio, was stolen from the Odesa Museum of Western and Eastern Art in Odesa, Ukraine. The theft attracted international attention because the painting was considered one of the most valuable artworks held in a Ukrainian museum collection.

The painting was recovered in Berlin in June 2010 during a joint operation by Ukrainian and German law enforcement authorities and was officially returned to Ukraine in August 2010. As the painting remained in judicial custody as evidence in criminal proceedings for many years, conservation treatment did not begin until 2018. Following restoration, it was exhibited at the Saint Sophia of Kyiv National Conservation Area in 2026 before being sent to the Lithuanian National Museum of Art for the international exhibition The Caravaggio Question.

== Background ==
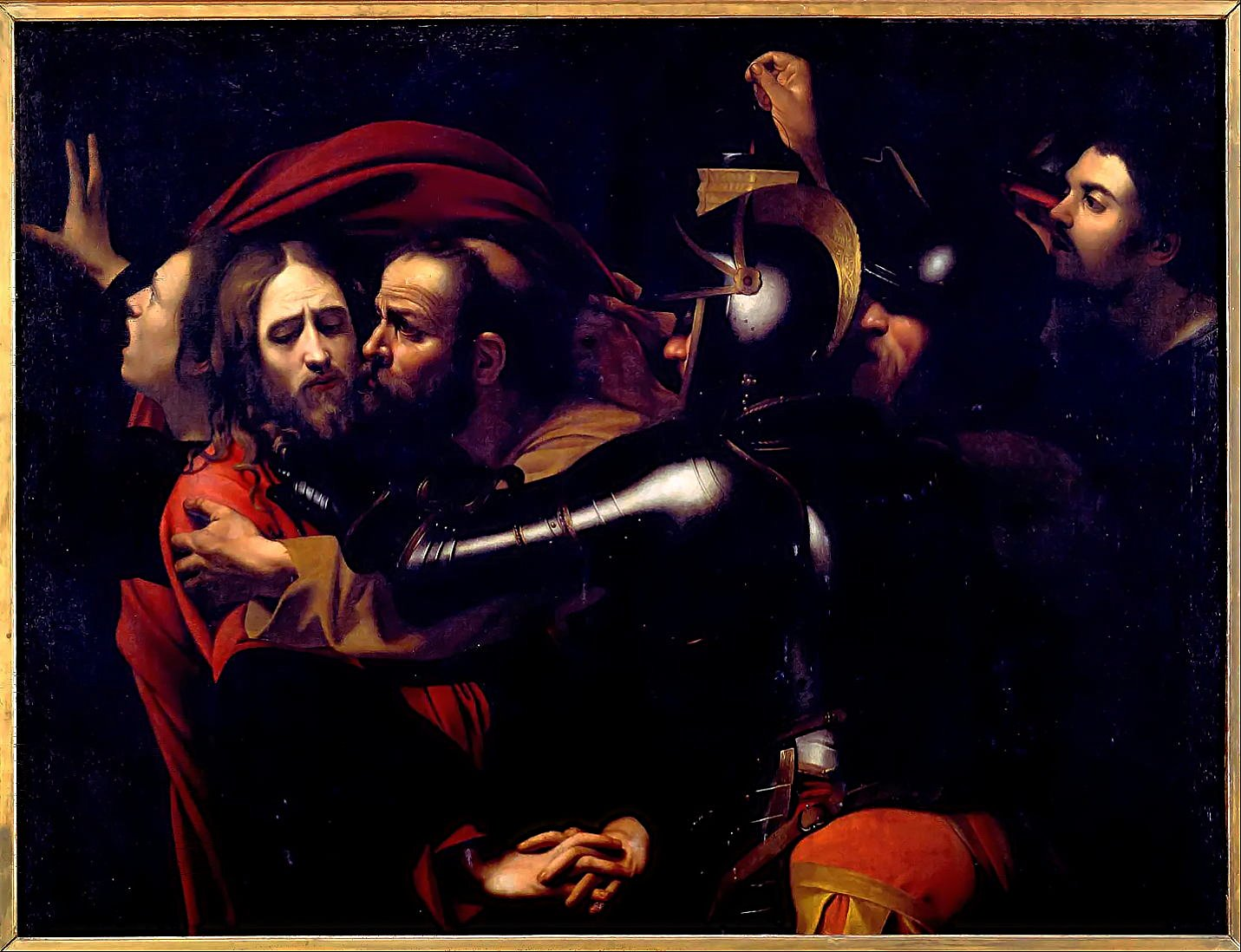
The Odesa version of The Taking of Christ before it was stolen in 2008

The Taking of Christ (also known as The Kiss of Judas) is a painting associated with the Italian Baroque painter Michelangelo Merisi da Caravaggio. The version held by the Odesa Museum of Western and Eastern Art entered the museum's collection in the early twentieth century and for decades was regarded as one of its most important exhibits.

The painting attracted considerable scholarly attention because of its possible attribution to Caravaggio. During the second half of the twentieth century a number of art historians supported the attribution, while others considered it to be a copy or a work produced in Caravaggio's workshop. Despite the ongoing debate, the painting remained one of the most significant Old Master works in Ukraine.

Prior to the theft, the painting was displayed in the museum's permanent exhibition. Security arrangements at the museum were later criticized after burglars were able to enter the building through a window, remove the canvas from its frame and escape without being detected.

== Theft ==
During the night of 30–31 July 2008, burglars broke into the Odesa Museum of Western and Eastern Art through a window on the second floor. The windowpane had been carefully removed without breaking it and without triggering the museum's outdated alarm system, allowing the burglars to enter the building undetected. After entering, they cut The Taking of Christ from its frame and escaped across the roof. The theft was discovered by museum staff the following morning, and the museum immediately notified the militsiya.

The theft attracted widespread media attention in Ukraine and abroad because the painting had long been regarded as one of the most significant works in the museum's collection. The burglary also prompted criticism of the museum's security measures, particularly its outdated alarm system.

== Investigation ==
Following the theft, the Ministry of Internal Affairs of Ukraine opened a criminal investigation. Investigators believed that the painting had been taken abroad shortly after the burglary and pursued several international leads.

The investigation continued for almost two years and involved cooperation between Ukrainian and German authorities. Information obtained during the investigation indicated that the painting had been transported to Germany, where members of an organized criminal group were attempting to sell it on the international art market. The recovery operation was coordinated with the Bundeskriminalamt (BKA) and the Frankfurt am Main Public Prosecutor's Office.

== Recovery and return to Ukraine ==
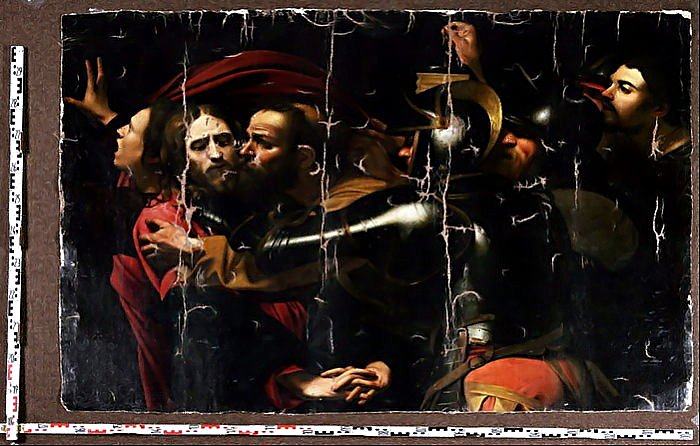
Condition of the painting after it was recovered from the thieves in 2010

On 28 June 2010, the BKA announced that the painting had been recovered during a joint police operation carried out in Berlin on 25 June. Four suspects were arrested in connection with the attempted sale of the painting, while the artwork itself was seized as evidence in the criminal proceedings. At a car park where a clandestine meeting with a supposed buyer had been arranged, an undercover police officer began negotiations for the purchase, after which officers of the BKA and GSG 9 arrested the suspects and recovered the canvas, which was found in one of their vehicles. According to the Ukrainian Interior Ministry, three of those arrested were Ukrainian citizens and one was a resident of Germany; the BKA's official statement, however, identified the fourth suspect as Russian.. German media also reported that a further 20 suspected members of the group had been arrested in Ukraine.

On 29 June 2010, Ukrainian Interior Minister Anatolii Mohyliov stated that another member of the criminal group had been arrested in Ukraine. He said that the authorities had conducted more than 20 searches and established the suspects' involvement in more than 20 thefts in Ukraine.

According to Ukrainian Interior Minister Anatolii Mohyliov, the operation to locate and recover the painting was conducted jointly by the Ukrainian Interior Ministry, the German criminal police and Czech police. Ukrainian investigators had documented the suspects' activities for an extended period, while a Ukrainian Interior Ministry undercover agent infiltrated the group by posing as a wealthy antiques collector. Former Interior Minister Yuriy Lutsenko stated that the investigation was conducted by the Interior Ministry's Special Operations Directorate and that the agent maintained contact with the suspects for several months, eventually obtaining evidence concerning the provenance of the stolen painting.

According to the German newspaper Der Tagesspiegel, during negotiations over the sale of the painting, the asking price was gradually reduced from $50 million to $45 million, then to $17 million and finally to $10 million.

Following forensic examination and the completion of legal formalities in Germany, the painting was officially handed over to Ukrainian authorities during a ceremony in Berlin on 30 August 2010. It was received by Ukrainian Minister of Internal Affairs Anatolii Mohyliov before being transported back to Ukraine.

Following the recovery of the painting, the three Ukrainian nationals arrested in Germany were extradited to Ukraine to face criminal prosecution. On 16 November 2010, a German court sentenced a man for his role in attempting to sell the stolen painting, imposing a suspended prison sentence.

After its return, the painting remained in the custody of Ukrainian law enforcement authorities as physical evidence in the criminal proceedings. Because of its procedural status, it could not immediately undergo full conservation treatment or be returned to the Odesa Museum of Western and Eastern Art.

== Conservation ==
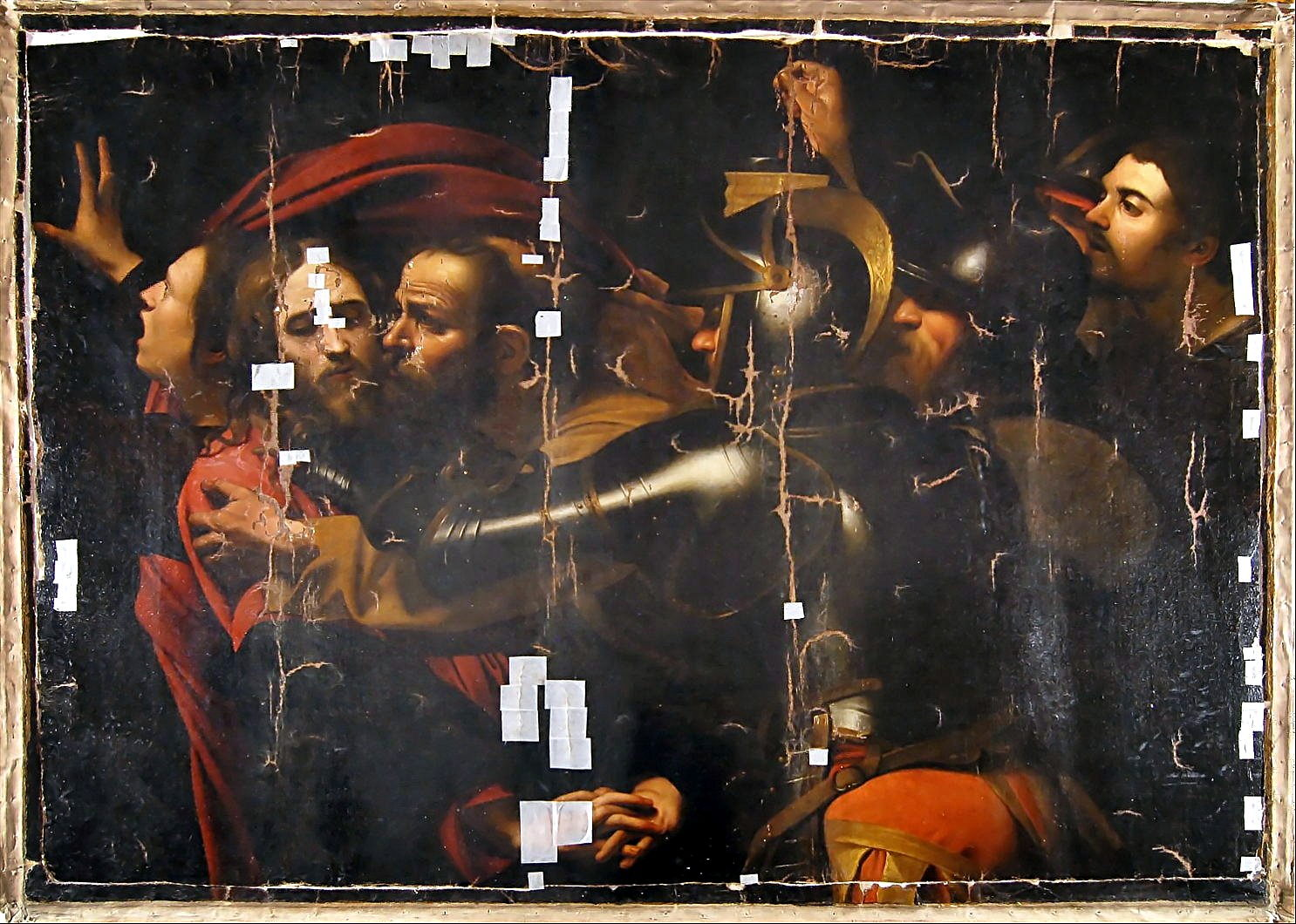
The painting after the canvas fragments cut off by the thieves were rejoined, 2019

After its recovery, The Taking of Christ remained under judicial seizure for several years as physical evidence in the criminal case, delaying conservation and restoration work. Museum officials and conservation specialists repeatedly warned that prolonged storage of the damaged canvas without treatment posed a serious risk to its long-term preservation.

In 2018, a Ukrainian court authorized the transfer of the painting to the National Research and Restoration Centre of Ukraine in Kyiv for conservation. Examination of the artwork revealed extensive damage caused during the theft and subsequent handling. The canvas had been removed from its stretcher, rolled, folded, torn in several places and contaminated with adhesive tape residue, dirt and other foreign materials.

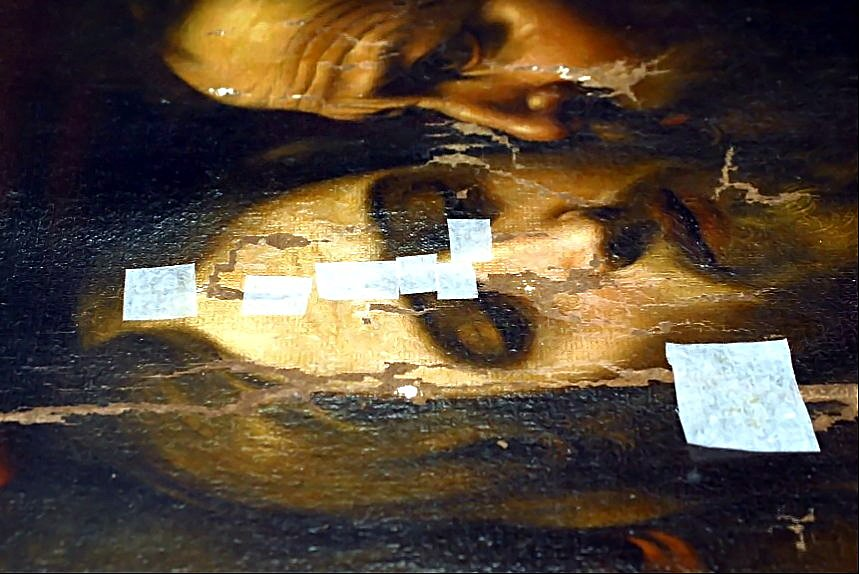
Fragment of the painting with temporary facing patches used to secure the paint layer during restoration, 2019

Conservation work began in September 2018 and proceeded in several stages. The initial phase focused on stabilizing the canvas, cleaning its surface and preventing further deterioration. This was followed by structural treatment, including the repair of tears, reinforcement of weakened areas and the reassembly of damaged sections of the original canvas. Technical conservation was completed in 2020, after which specialists continued with comprehensive restoration and aesthetic reintegration of the painted surface.

Following the completion of conservation and restoration, the painting was prepared for public exhibition. It was presented to the public in Kyiv in February 2026 as part of an exhibition devoted to the history, conservation and attribution of the artwork before being loaned for exhibition in Lithuania.

== Legal proceedings ==
Criminal proceedings against the suspects continued in Ukraine for more than fifteen years. Following their extradition from Germany, the defendants were charged with offences related to the theft and attempted illegal transfer of the painting. Court proceedings were repeatedly delayed and restarted, resulting in numerous adjournments and lengthy consideration of the case.

Because the proceedings remained unresolved for many years, museum representatives, conservators and cultural heritage specialists repeatedly criticized the delays, warning that the painting's condition continued to deteriorate while the case remained pending.

On 28 August 2025, the Podilskyi District Court of Kyiv closed the criminal proceedings after determining that the statutory limitation period had expired. The prosecution appealed the decision, but on 7 January 2026 the Kyiv Court of Appeal upheld the ruling, bringing the criminal case to a close. Following the conclusion of the proceedings, the legal obstacles preventing the painting's return to the museum were removed.

== Exhibitions ==
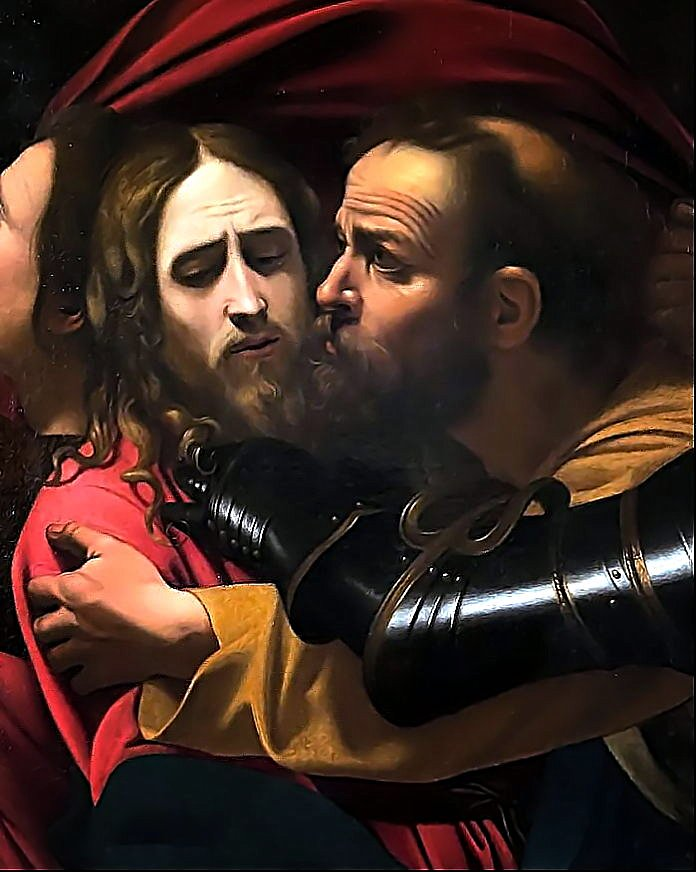
Detail of the restored painting depicting Christ and Judas, 2026

In February 2026, The Taking of Christ was presented to the public at the Saint Sophia of Kyiv National Conservation Area for the first time following the completion of its conservation and restoration. The exhibition focused on the painting's history, attribution, theft, recovery and conservation, and included documentation of the restoration process as well as the results of technical and scientific examination.

In April 2026, the painting was transported to Lithuania under special security arrangements for the international exhibition The Caravaggio Question, organized by the Lithuanian National Museum of Art. The exhibition opened at the Vilnius Picture Gallery in June 2026, where the Odesa painting was displayed alongside another version of The Taking of Christ traditionally attributed to Caravaggio. The exhibition examined questions of attribution, provenance and conservation, and represented the first international display of the Odesa painting following its restoration.
