= St Mark (Hals) =

Painting by Frans Hals

St. Mark
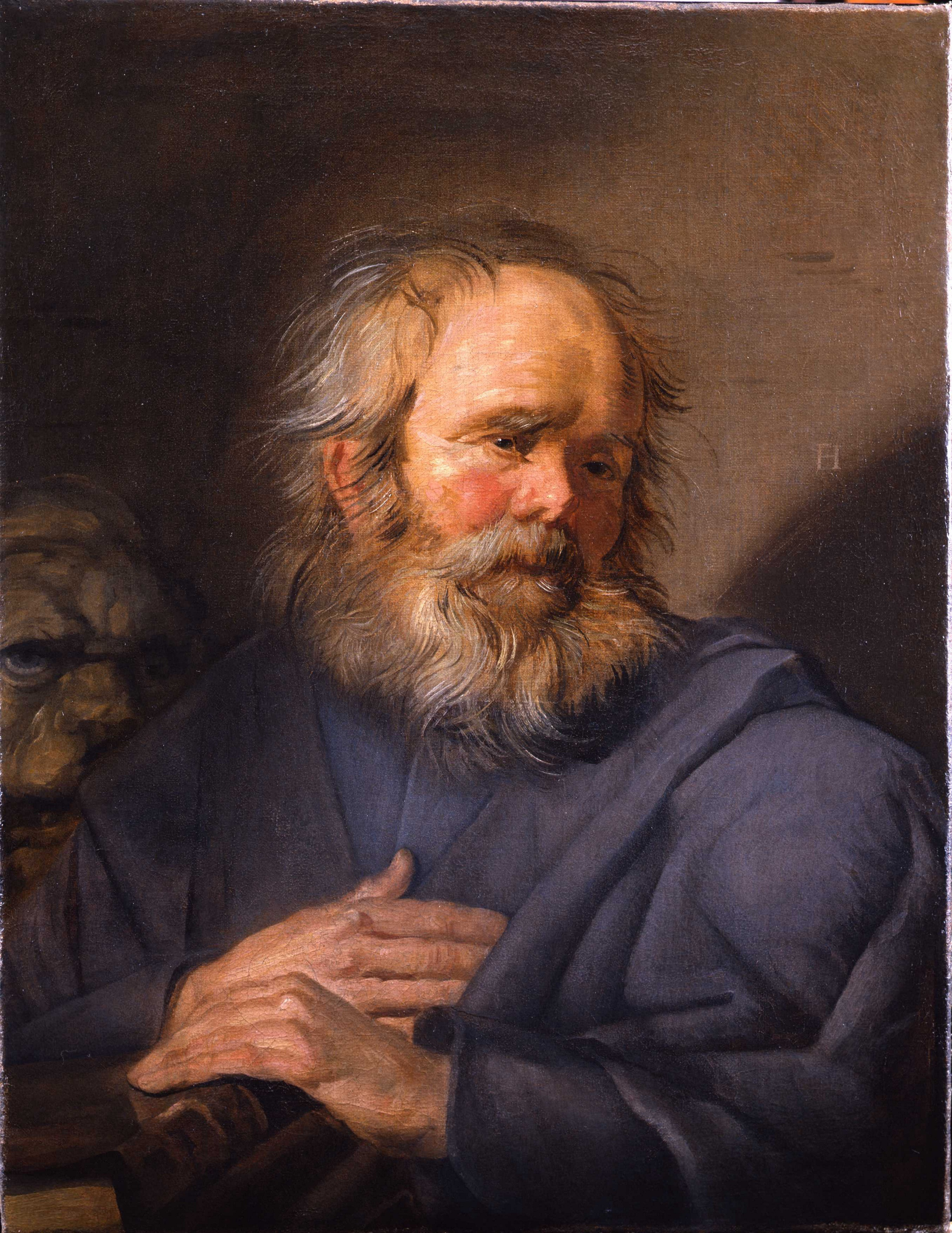
- St. Mark, c.1625, oil on canvas, 68.5 x 52.5 cm
- Artist: Frans Hals
- Year: 1625
- Catalogue: Claus Grimm, Catalog 1989: #43
- Medium: Oil on canvas
- Dimensions: 68.5 cm × 52.5 cm (27.0 in × 20.7 in)
- Location: Pushkin Museum of Fine Arts; Moscow

St. Mark is an oil-on-canvas painting by the Dutch Golden Age painter Frans Hals, painted in 1625. It was purchased by Russian philanthropist Alisher Usmanov from the art dealer Colnaghi, London in September 2013 for the Pushkin Museum and donated by him to that museum in November that year, where it still hangs.

== Description ==
The painting depicts St. Mark in traditional iconography as a gray-haired old man in a rough cloak, leaning on a pile of books of the biography of Christ written by him. At his elbow shows the head of a lion – an indispensable attribute of Mark. The waist section of the figure and the small size of the canvas (68.5 x 52.5 cm) indicate its chamber purpose. The space of the room is barely marked, which focuses the viewer's attention on the subject's face and hands, which are sharply characterized. The painting is made with oil on canvas in warm colors, with a predominance of brown, which corresponds to the color scheme of the Golden Age of Dutch art.

== The Four Evangelists of Frans Hals ==
Initially, the picture was part of a series of paintings of the four Evangelists: Luke, Matthew, Mark and John. The art historians Seymour Slive and Klaus Grimm agree the series dates to the mid-1620s.

Nothing is known about the commissioner of the paintings and the circumstances of their creation. Perhaps the paintings were made for the Catholic or Lutheran church, although the small size and intimate nature of the painting suggests that they were made for a small private chapel, or perhaps for the hidden Catholic church (schuilkerk) in Haarlem, or even for a private house. Catholic services were allowed in Haarlem in April 1581, but home chapels were before. It is also possible that the customer was a Protestant, or the artist painted them for himself, as Hendrick ter Brugghen did with a similar cycle, or Rembrandt with the apostles. Klaus Grimm and Seymour Slive agree that the order was most likely private, rather than secular. Until the 18th century, the canvases were in Holland.

The four evangelists by Hals were documented in 1910 by Hofstede de Groot, who wrote "The Four Evangelists. - Four separate pictures, each of them a half-length, showing the hands and attributes of the saint. Canvas, each 27 1/2 inches by 22 inches. Sales. - Gerard Hoet, The Hague, August 25, 1760 (Terw. 231), No. 134 (120 florins, Yver). The Hague, April 13, 1771, Z. No. 35. F.W. Baron van Borck, Amsterdam, May 1, 1771, No. 34 (33 florins, Yver)." At the time he was writing, these paintings were considered lost:

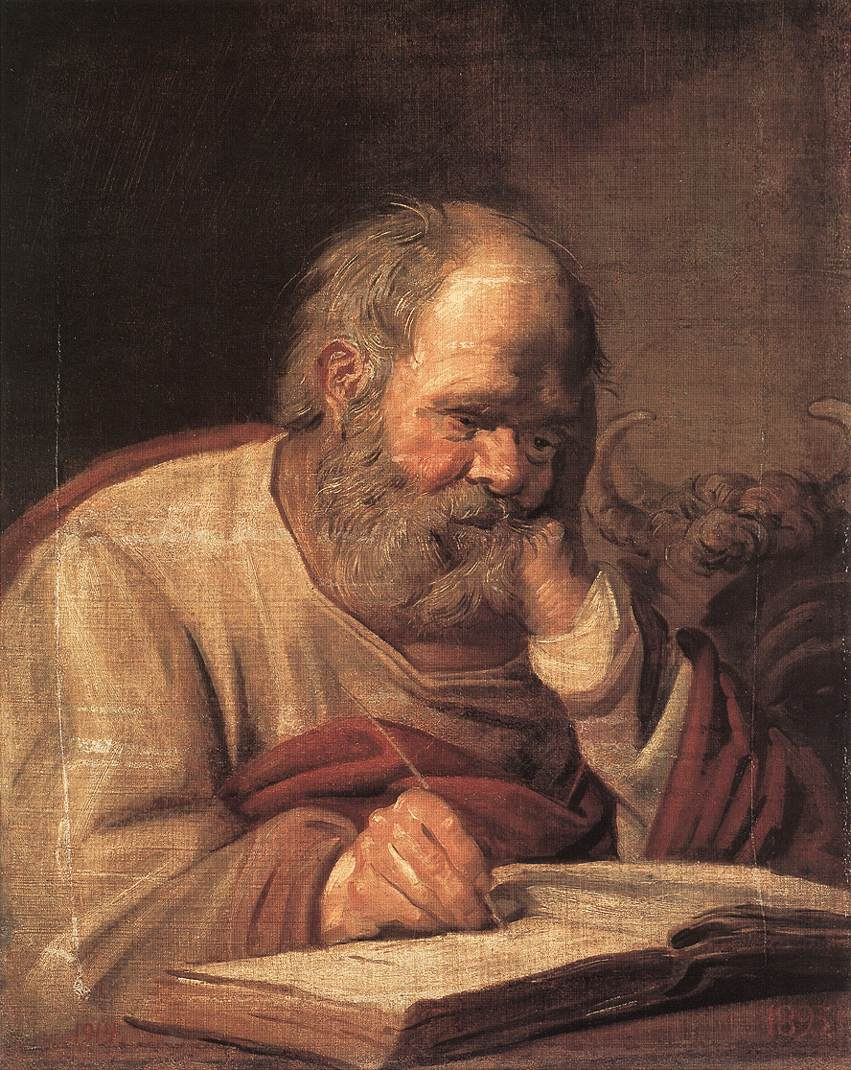
St. Luke

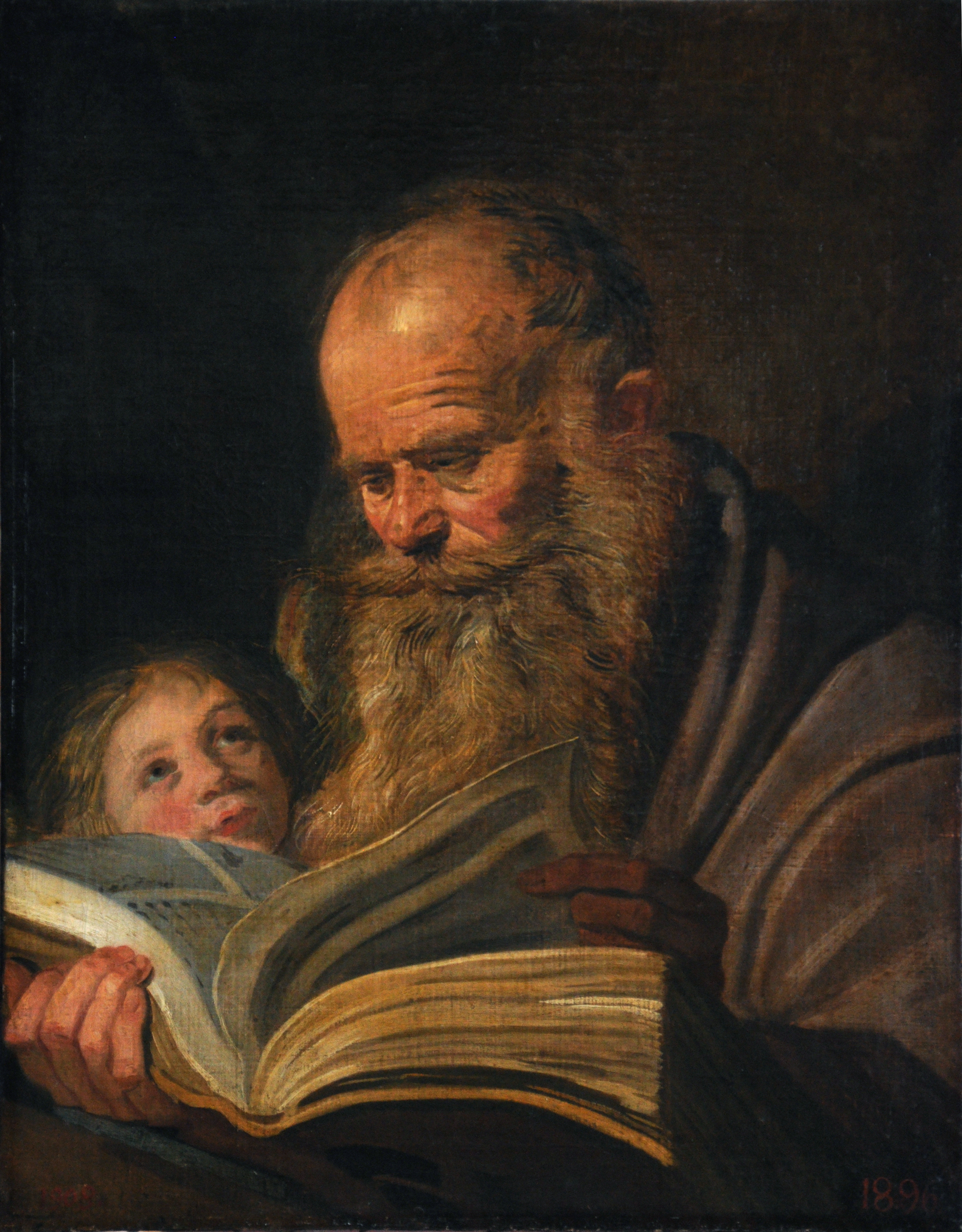
St. Matthew

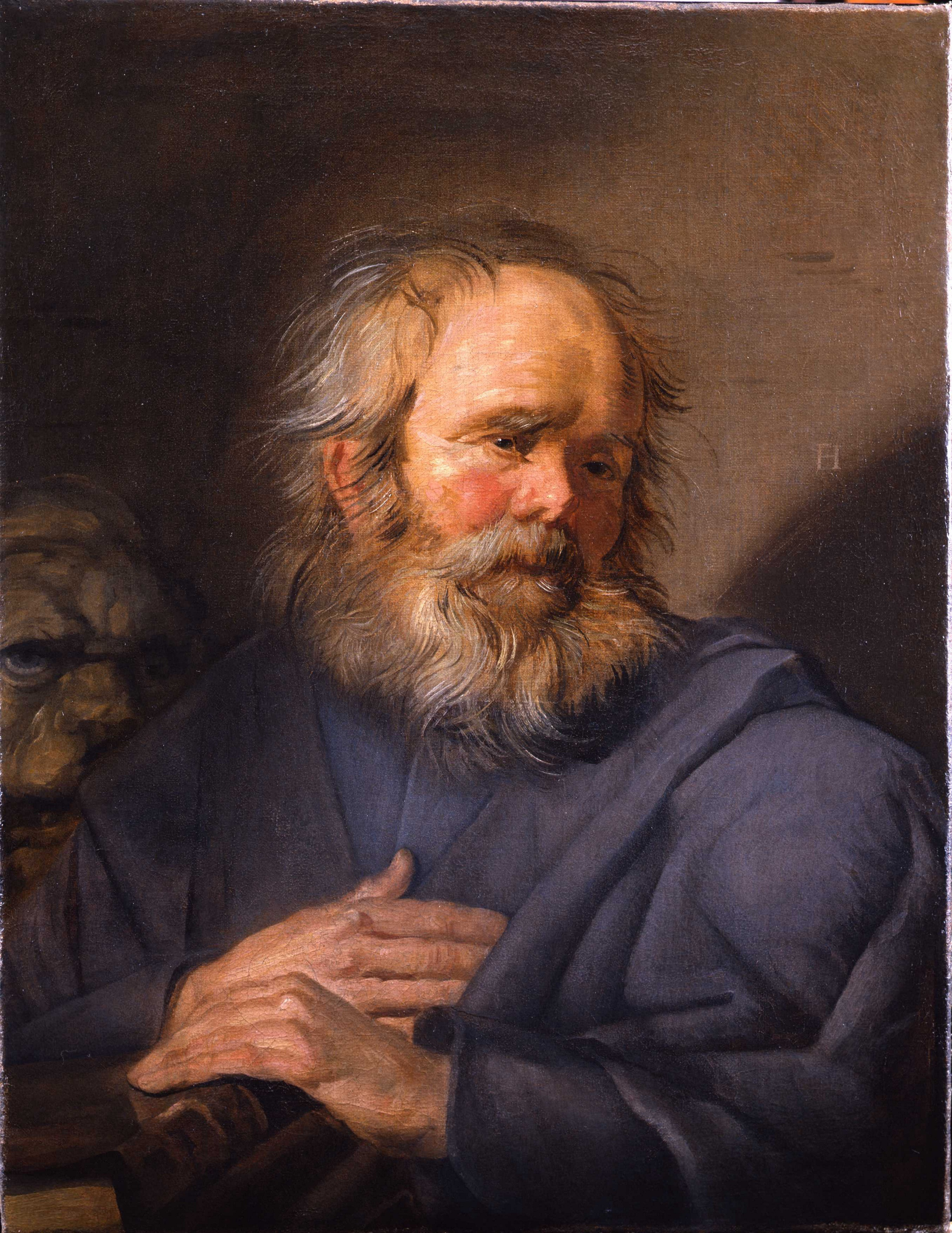
St. Mark

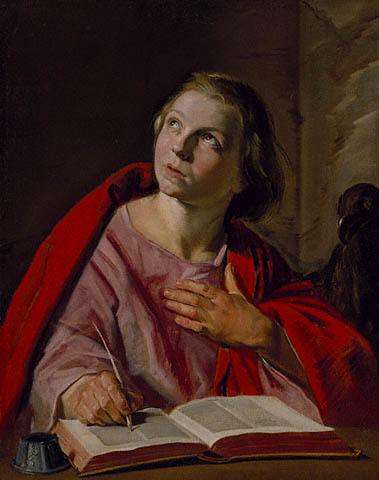
St. John

== History ==
This painting was documented in the 18th century but was rediscovered in the 1970s, when it was identified by Claus Grimm as one of four lost paintings by Hals of the evangelists. At the time the painting had a collar painted over the beard and robe and was attributed to Luca Giordano.

In his 1989 catalog of the international Frans Hals exhibition, Seymour Slive included a photo of the before picture to show why the painting had been lost for so many years.

Before and after restoration:

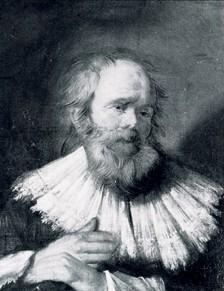
Before

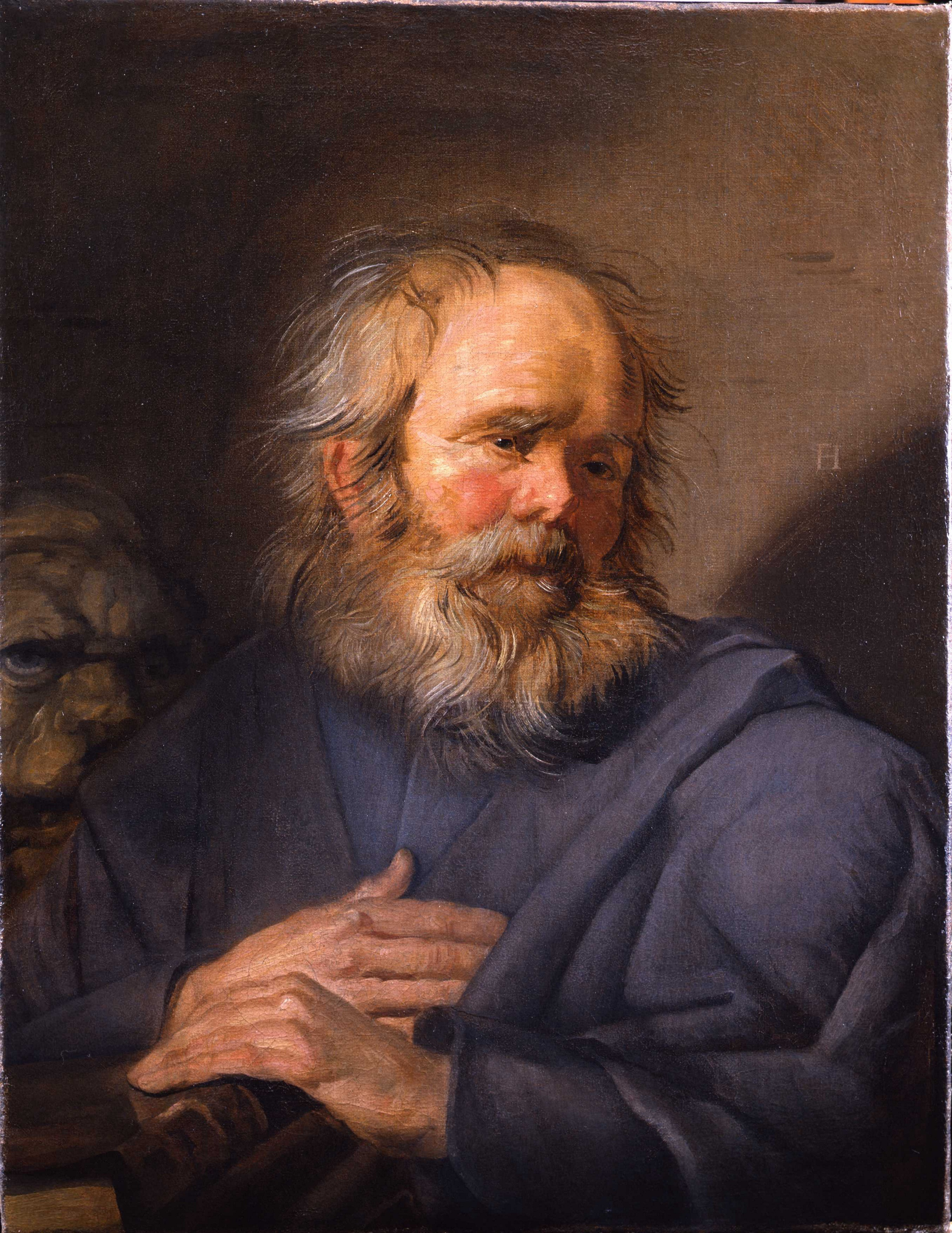
After

== See also ==
- List of paintings by Frans Hals

== Bibliography ==
- Grimm, Claus (1974). St. Markus von Frans Hals. Maltecnik / Restauro. pp. 21–31.
- Howard, J. (2008). Frans Hals St Mark. A Lost Masterpice Rediscovered. London: Colnaghi/Salomon Lilian.
- Slive, Seymour (1990). Frans Hals. Catalogue of Exhibition. Washington / London / Haarlem. pp. 193–197.
- Smith, John (1910). A catalogue raisonné of the works of the most eminent Dutch painters of the seventeenth century. London: London Macmillan. p. 9.
