= St John (Hals) =

Painting by Frans Hals

St. John
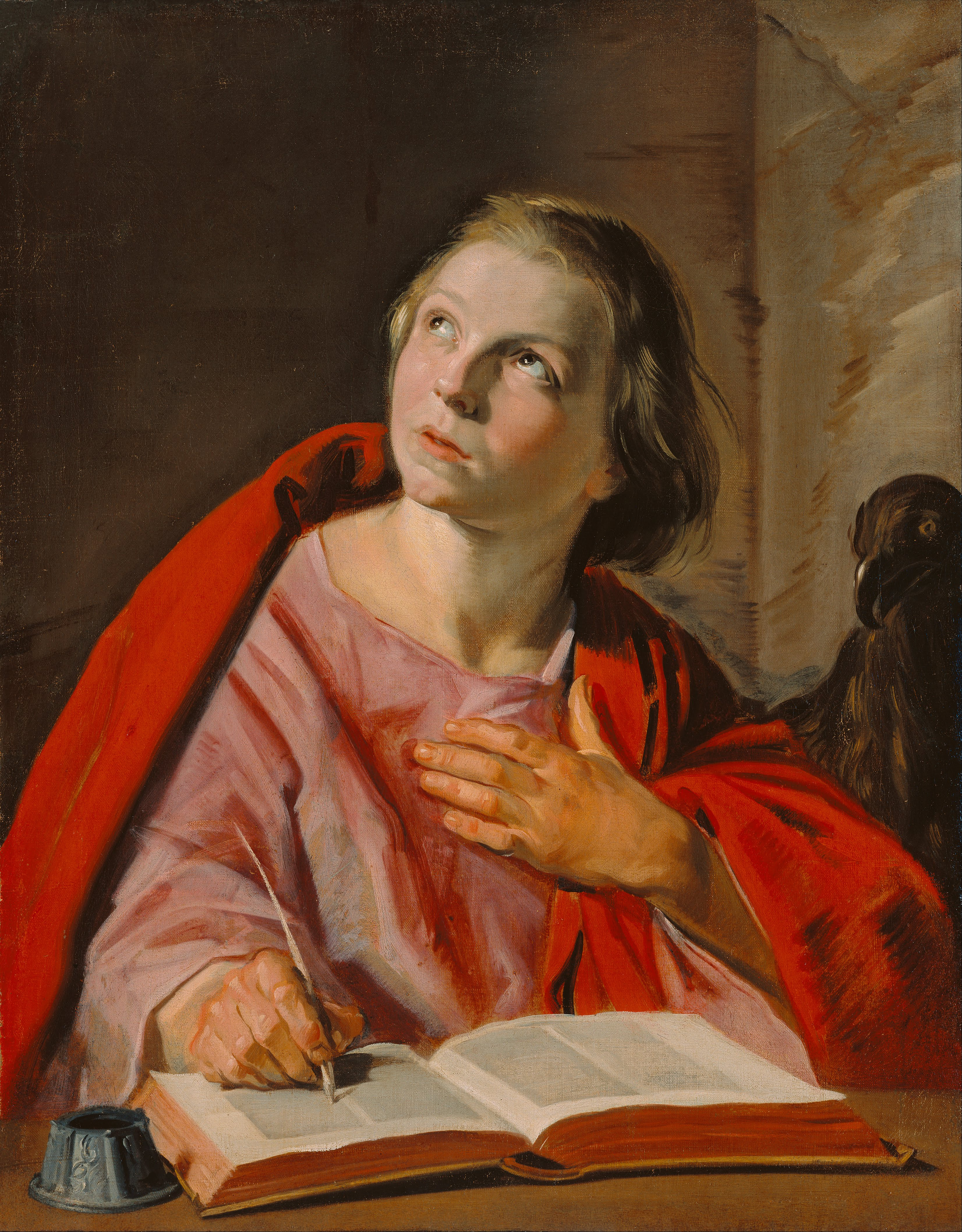
- St. John, c.1625 Oil on canvas, 69.5 x 55 cm
- Artist: Frans Hals
- Year: 1625
- Medium: Oil on canvas
- Dimensions: 68.5 cm × 52.5 cm (27.0 in × 20.7 in)
- Location: Getty Museum, Los Angeles
- Accession: 97.PA.48
- Website: Getty guide online

St. John is an oil-on-canvas painting by the Dutch Golden Age painter Frans Hals, painted in 1625 and now in the Getty Museum, Los Angeles.

== Painting ==
The painting shows St. John looking upwards while writing in a book, with a bird (presumably an eagle) at his elbow. This painting was documented in the 18th century but later considered lost. It was rediscovered in July 1997, when it was auctioned at Sotheby's in London as one of four lost paintings by Hals of the evangelists. The sale price of US$2.9 million was a record high for a Frans Hals painting at the time.

The four evangelists by Hals were documented in 1910 by Hofstede de Groot, who wrote "The Four Evangelists. – Four separate pictures, each of them a half-length, showing the hands and attributes of the saint. Canvas, each 27 1/2 inches by 22 inches. Sales. – Gerard Hoet, The Hague, August 25, 1760 (Terw. 231), No. 134 (120 florins, Yver). The Hague, April 13, 1771, Z. No. 35. F.W. Baron van Borck, Amsterdam, May 1, 1771, No. 34 (33 florins, Yver)." At the time he was writing, all of these paintings were considered lost:

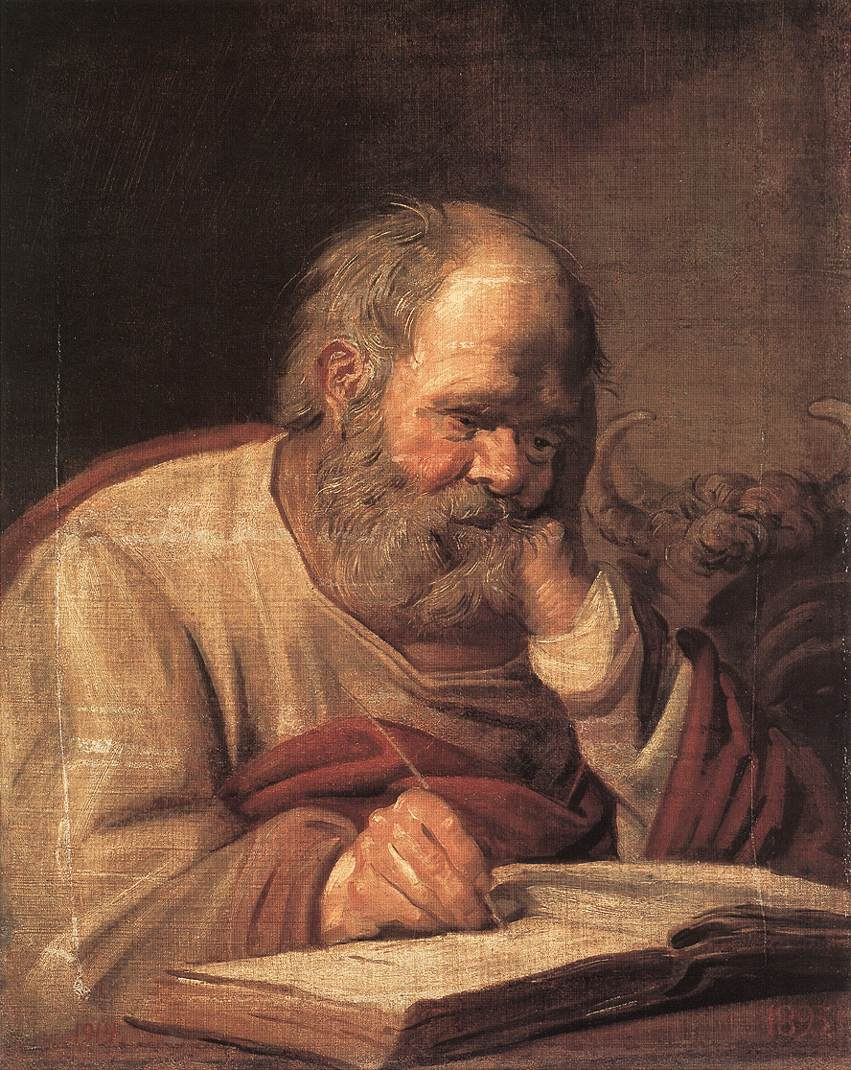
St. Luke

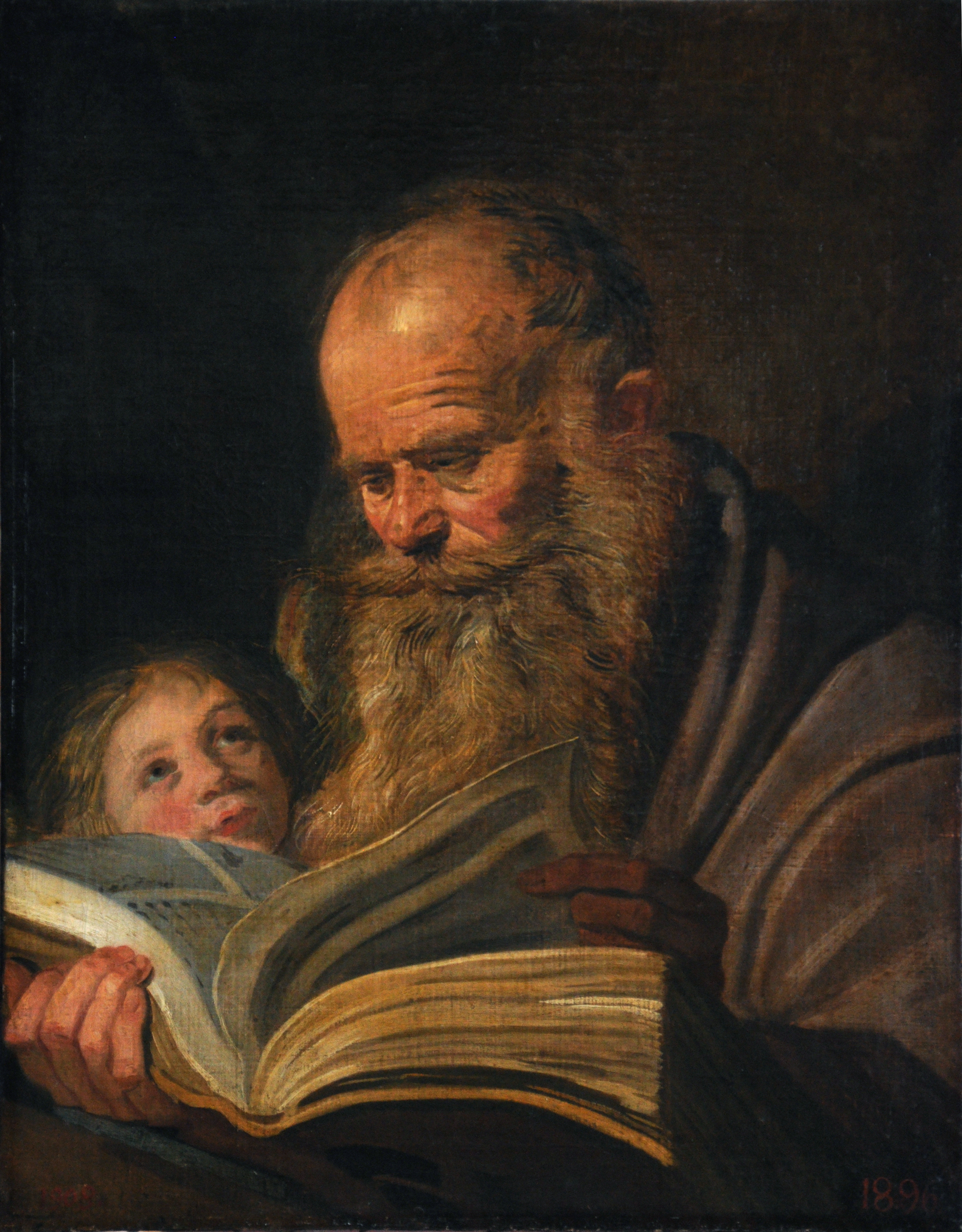
St. Matthew

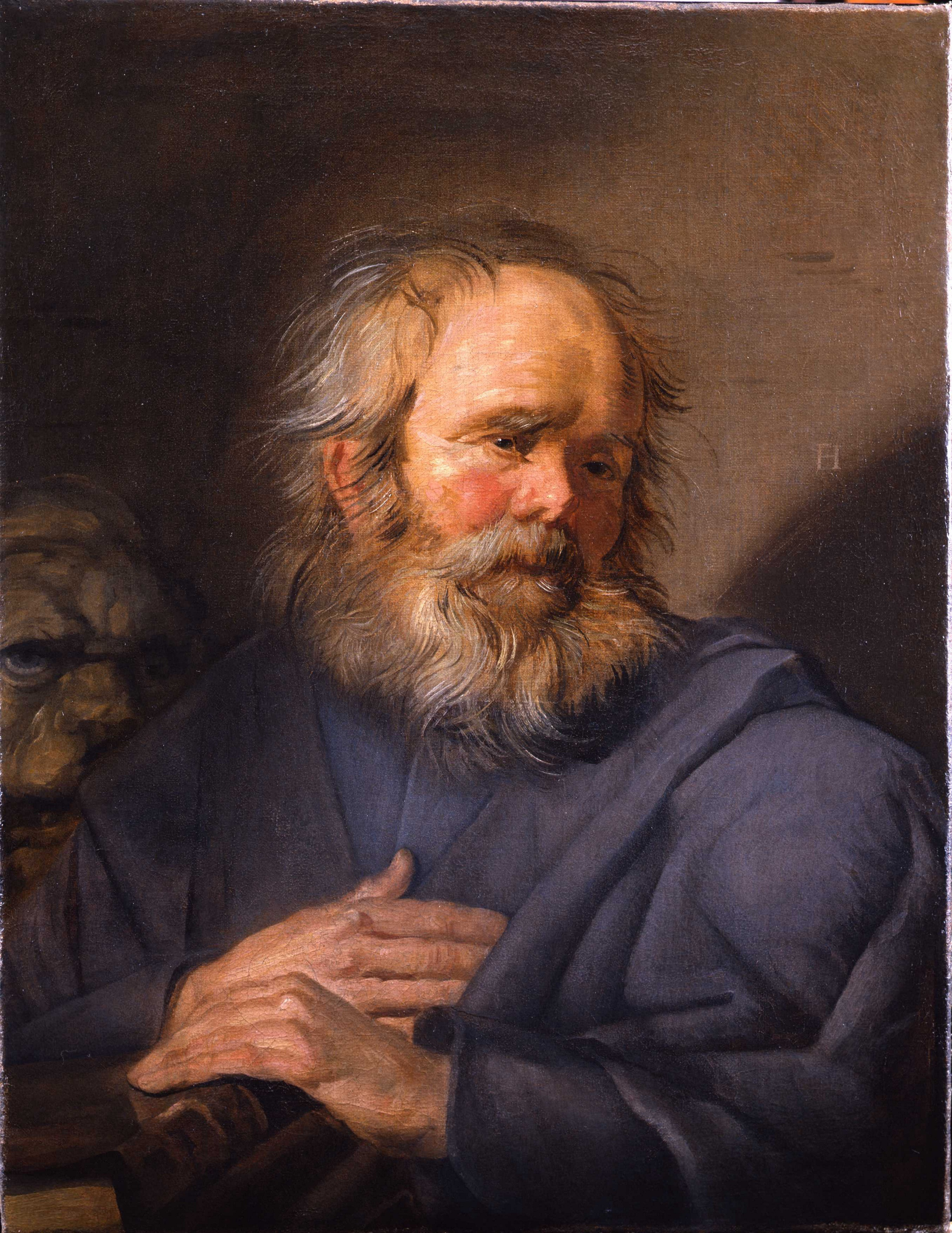
St. Mark

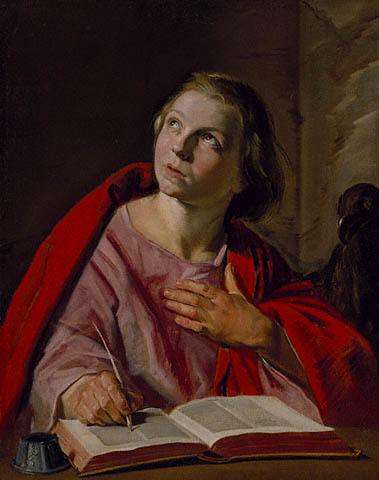
St. John

== See also ==
- List of paintings by Frans Hals
