= St Matthew (Hals) =

Painting by Frans Hals

St. Matthew
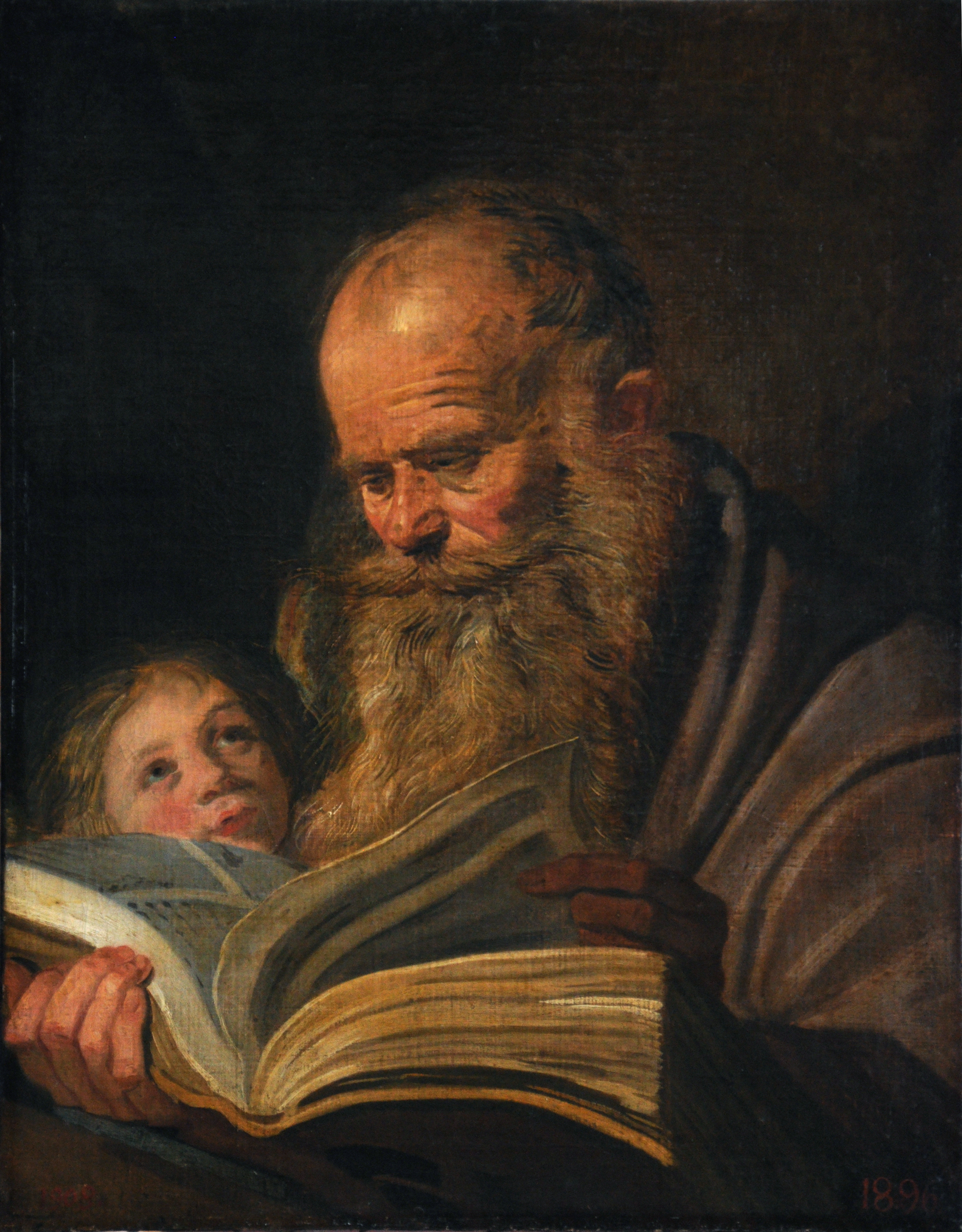
- St. Matthew, c. 1625 Oil on canvas, 70 x 55 cm
- Artist: Frans Hals
- Year: 1625
- Catalogue: Seymour Slive, Catalog 1974: #44
- Medium: Oil on canvas
- Dimensions: 70 cm × 55 cm (28 in × 22 in)
- Location: Odesa Museum of Western and Eastern Art, Odesa
- Accession: 180

St. Matthew is an oil-on-canvas painting by the Dutch Golden Age painter Frans Hals, painted in 1625. The painting belongs to the Odesa Museum of Western and Eastern Art, Odesa. Currently (2025), it is on display at the Gemäldegalerie, Berlin.

== Painting ==
The painting shows Saint Matthew sitting at a desk reading with an angel at his elbow. To his left stands a young child looking up at the man with widened eyes. The man is draped in heavy, voluminous fabric. Its folds and creases are detailed with shadows that add a sense of weight to his figure. In his hands, there is a book with yellowed and slightly worn pages. Its back is leaned against the table. The figures are placed very close to each other, and they occupy the center of the composition.

The painting St. Matthew by Frans Hals is a remarkable work belonging to a series of religious paintings known as the Four Evangelists. All paintings have a shared theme, color palette and they show the stylistic approach characteristic of Hals.

The four evangelists by Hals:

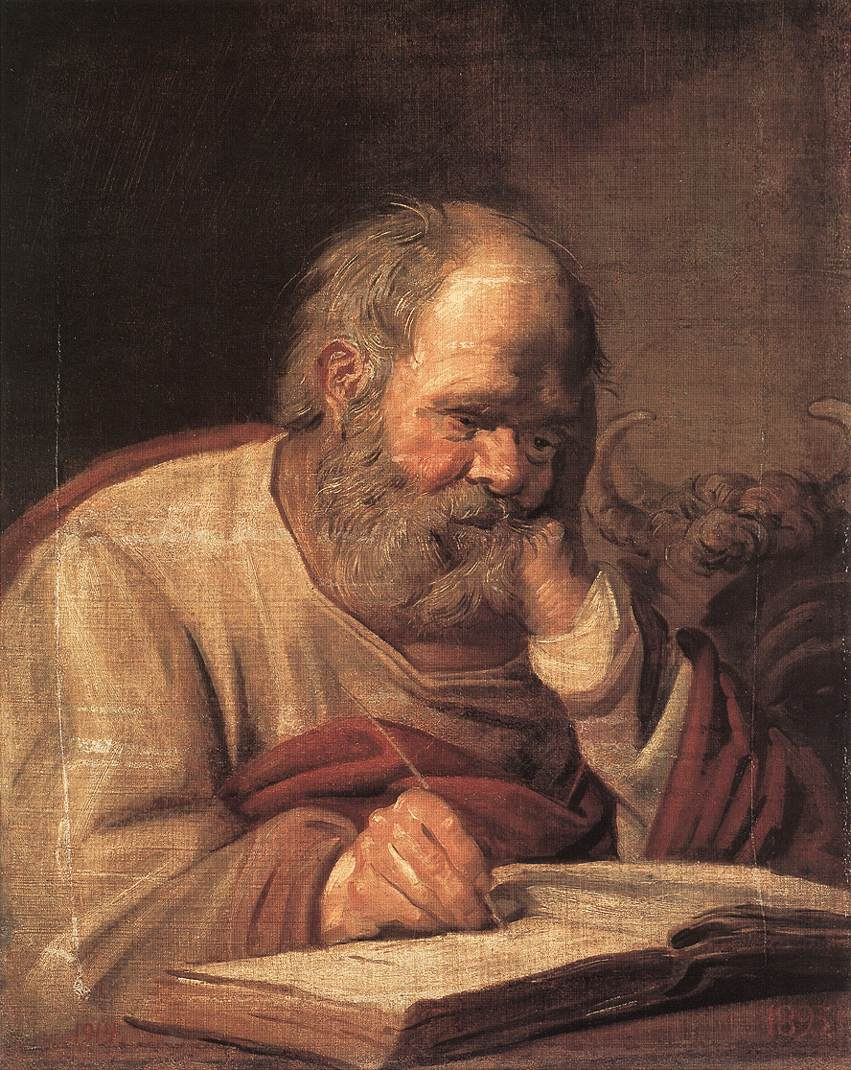
St. Luke

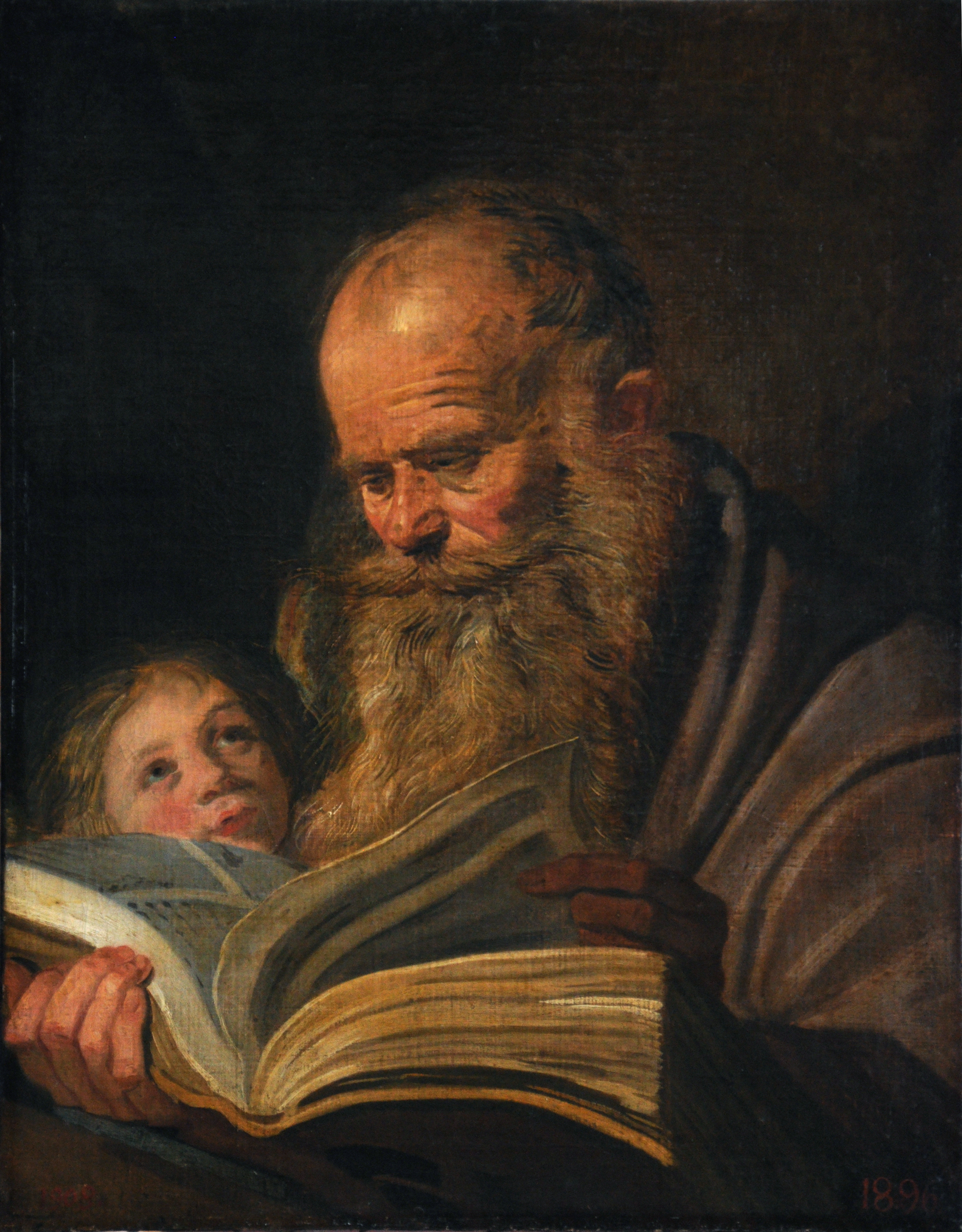
St. Matthew

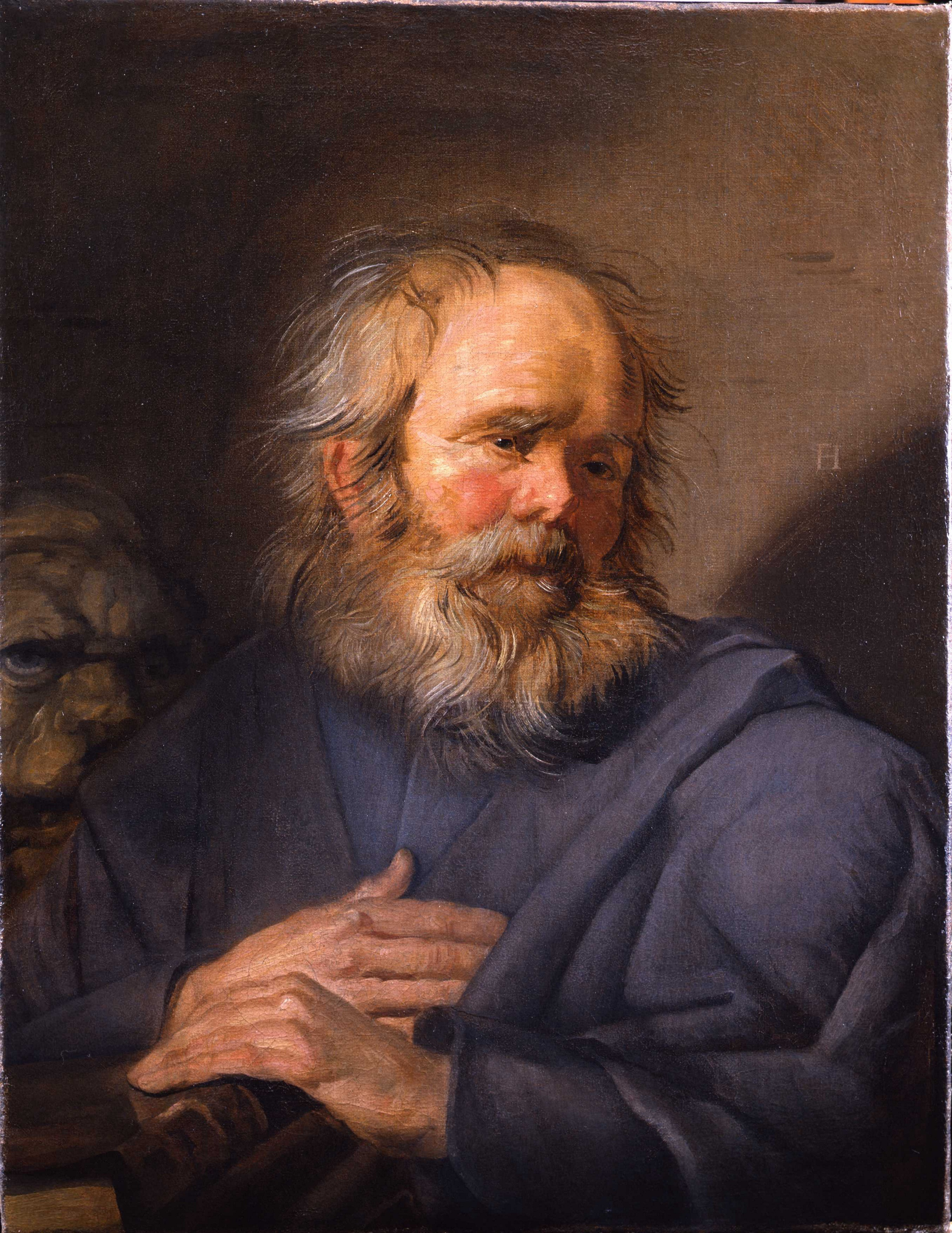
St. Mark

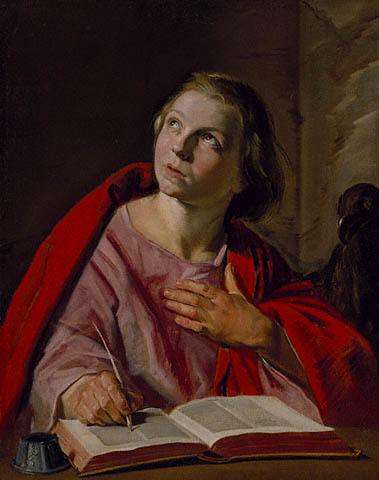
St. John

In his 1989 catalog of the international Frans Hals exhibition, Slive included a photo of Hals' Two singing boys with a lute and a music book to show that his theme of a main subject with a secondary witness was common to many of Hals' paintings of the 1620s and the models as secondary witness in these two paintings were clearly cousins.

Two singing boys and Matthew:

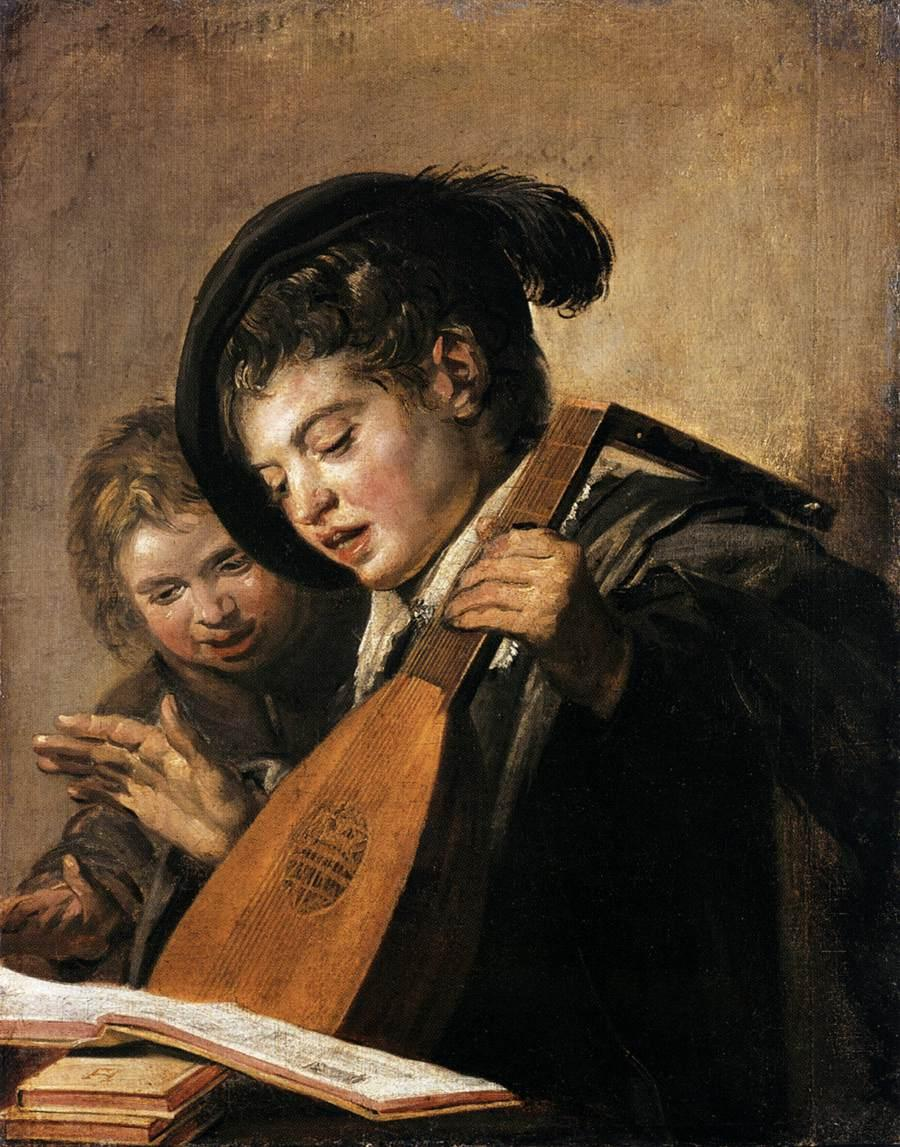
Two singing boys

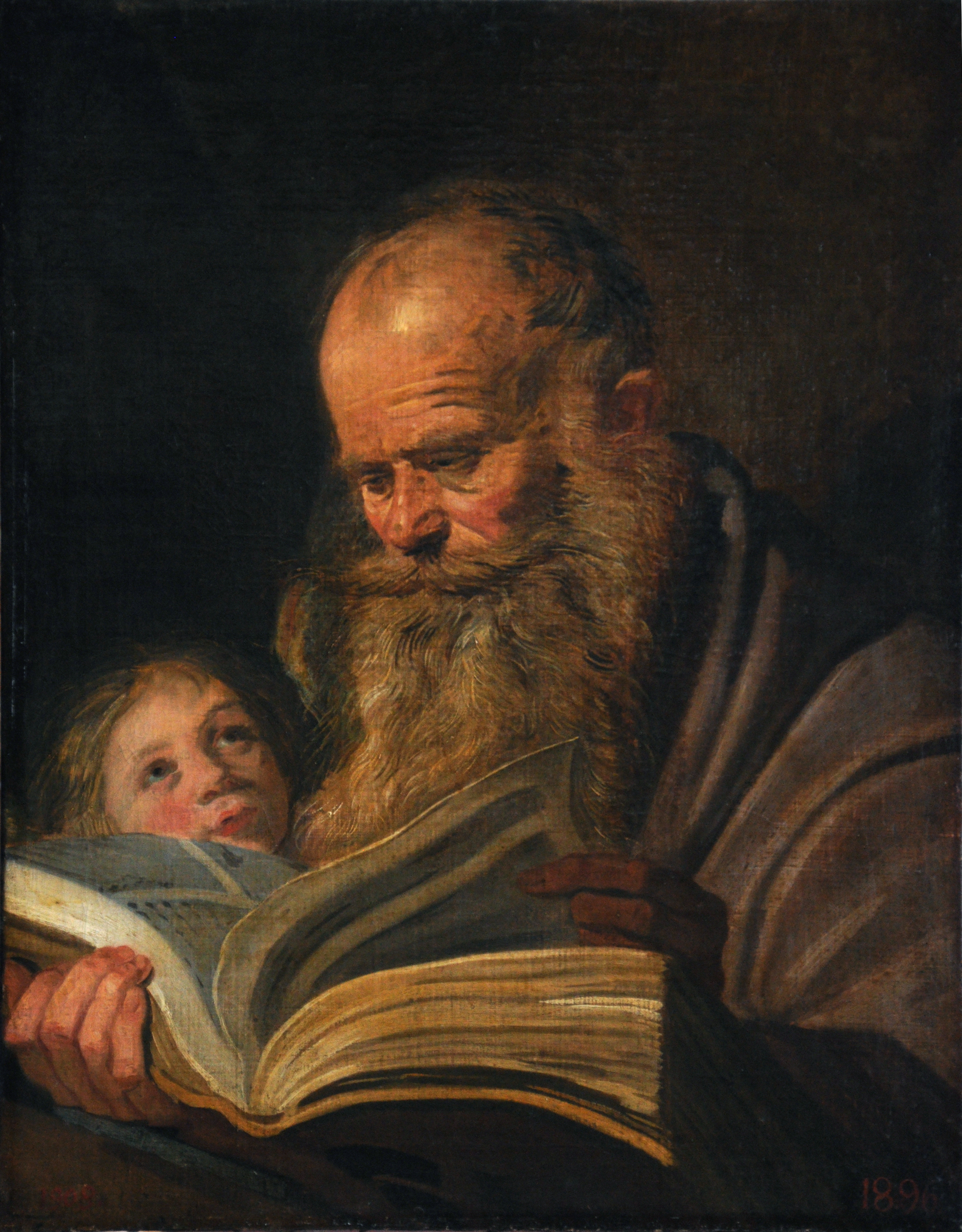
St. Matthew

== Provenance ==
Frans Hals's painting St. Matthew, currently displayed at the exhibition "From Odesa to Berlin: European Painting of the 16th to 19th Century" in the Gemäldegalerie Berlin, came to Germany from Ukraine. The exhibition holds 60 paintings in total, all from the Museum of Western and Eastern Art in Odesa. The museum was established in 1924 and made Odesa an important trademark for establishing a cultural connection between Ukraine and Western Europe. The curation at Gemäldegalerie offers a dialogue between the works from Odesa, and 25 works created by master artists that were preserved in Berlin.

During World War II, many works of art along with the archival works tracking their provenance have been destroyed. Thus, for many pieces such as St. Matthew, it is impossible to determine the complete journey of the artwork from its origin up until today. The earliest documentation of St. Matthew come from the Dutch inventories of 18th century. It is known that Catherine II acquired these paintings in 1771 for her own collection and brought them to St Petersburg. They were kept in storage and not publicly displayed. In 1774, they were included in the Hermitage catalogue and numbered. In 1812, Tsar Alexander I ordered their transfer to Taurida along with 28 other paintings. The records show both St. Matthew and St Luke listed in the "Registry of Paintings Sent by the Tsar to the Catholic Churches in the Colonies of Novorossiya (New Russia)" under the name of Francois Hals. Their whereabouts between 1812 and their official registration in Odesa's museum in 1948 remain unclear. At the time they were considered to be by unknown 19th-century painters, but Linnik recognized them as the work of a 17th-century master and eventually traced their history back to the 17th century, identifying them as two of four lost paintings by Hals of the evangelists, namely Luke and Matthew. Their first major public exhibition was in 1962 at Haarlem's Frans Hals retrospective, followed by a 1965 showcase at Moscow's Pushkin Museum. The international attention helped to spur art detectives and eventually the other two of John and Mark were also rediscovered.

== See also ==
- List of paintings by Frans Hals
