= Odesa Museum of Western and Eastern Art =

Art museum in Odesa, Ukraine

- Музей західного і східного мистецтва
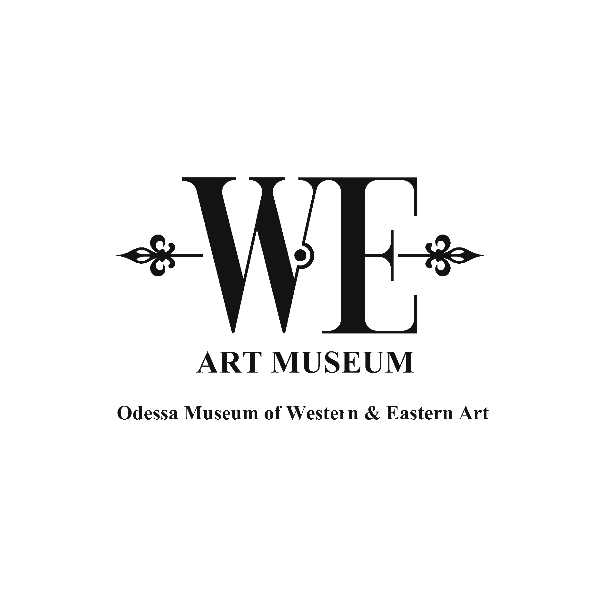

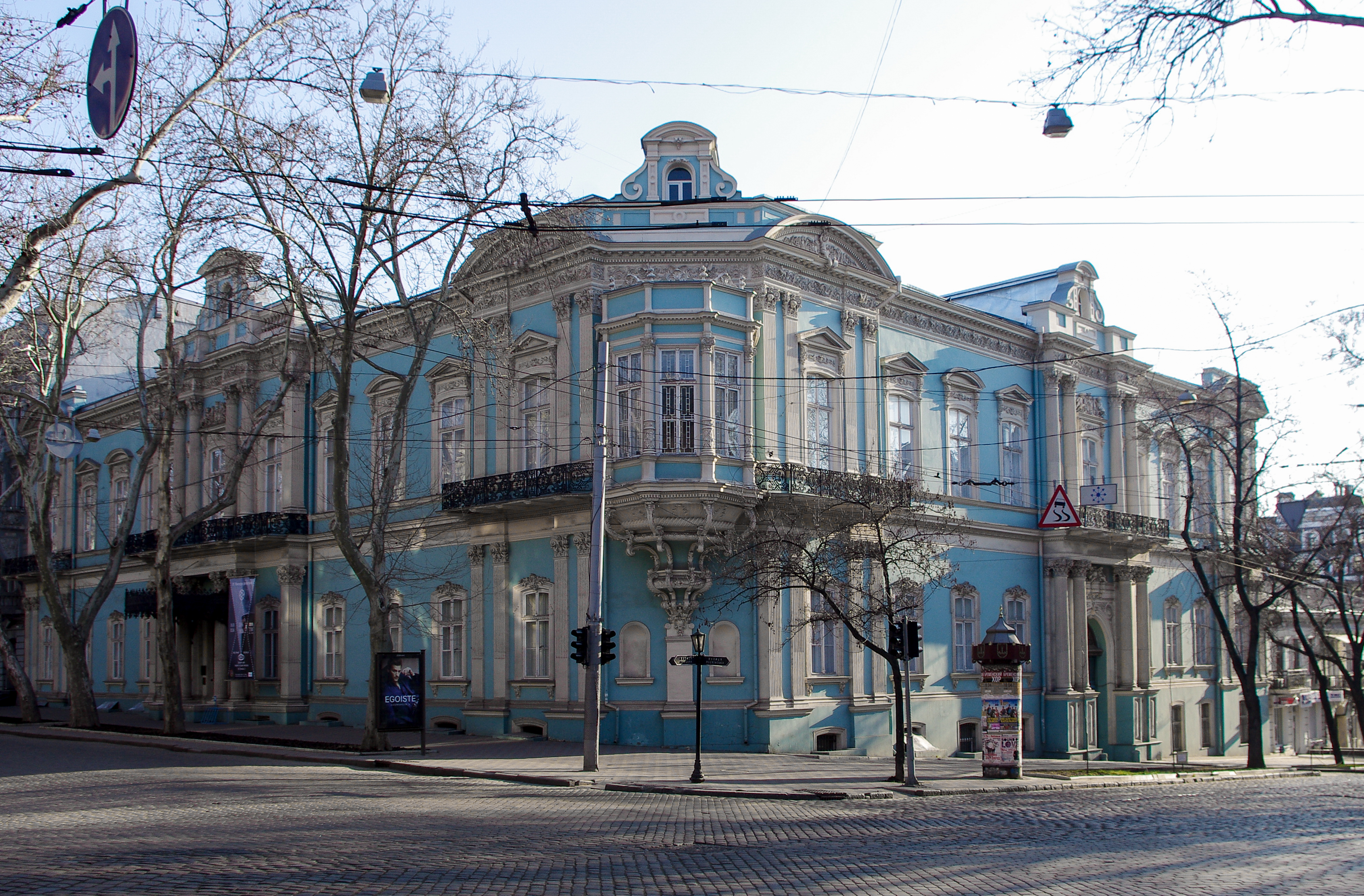
- Established: 1923
- Location: Italiiska Street, Odesa
- Coordinates: 46.48269°N 30.74346°E
- Collection size: 10 000
- Director: Igor Poronnik

The Odesa Museum of Western and Eastern Art (Ukrainian: Одеський музей західного і східного мистецтва, romanized: Odeskyi muzei zakhidnoho i skhidnoho mystetstva) is a museum of Fine Arts on Italiiska street in Odesa, Ukraine.

== Description ==
The museum was founded in 1923 and it is housed in a palace that was constructed between 1856 and 1858 to a design by the architect L.Otton. The museum's collection was created from previously private collections that were augmented by artefacts from the City Museum of Fine Arts and University of Odesa. The Series including paintings by Frans Hals belonged to the Russian empress Ekaterina the 2nd as she bought the paintings in 1760-1770.

The museum has a large collection, not all of which is on show, including works by Gerard David, Jan van Scorel, Rubens, Abraham Bloemaert, Frans Hals, and others. Its storerooms became known when two tronies by the painter Frans Hals were discovered languishing there in 1958 by Irina Linnik, a curator of the Ermitage Museum of St Petersburg, who recognized them as the lost paintings by Hals of the evangelists Luke and Matthew. These two were once part of a foursome described in 18th-century auction documents. She traced their history back to the 17th century, and after her work was published in 1959, the other two of John and Mark were also rediscovered. Art of China, Japan, India, Iran and Tibet is represented in the Eastern halls of the museum. The collection includes silk paintings, porcelain, amazing embroideries, ancient weaponry, statuettes and other items from the XVI-XVII centuries.

On July 20, 2023, at night, the building of the Odesa Museum of Western and Oriental Art was damaged as a result of rocket attack on Odesa during the Russian invasion of Ukraine. Minister of Culture and Information Policy of Ukraine Oleksandr Tkachenko said that the ministry is holding talks with international partners on the priority conservation of the affected museums. The Ministry of Culture also calls on UNESCO "to name the aggressor and rethink its role in the organization's governing bodies."

== Collection ==
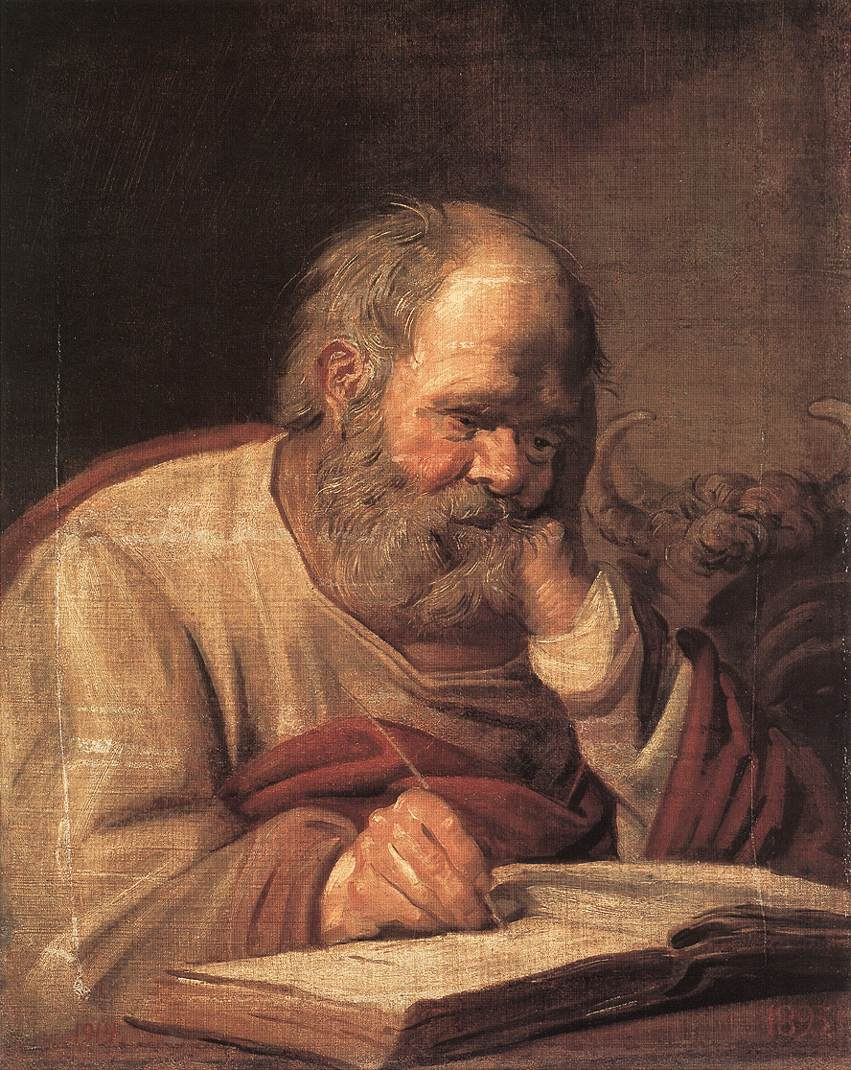
St Luke by Frans Hals

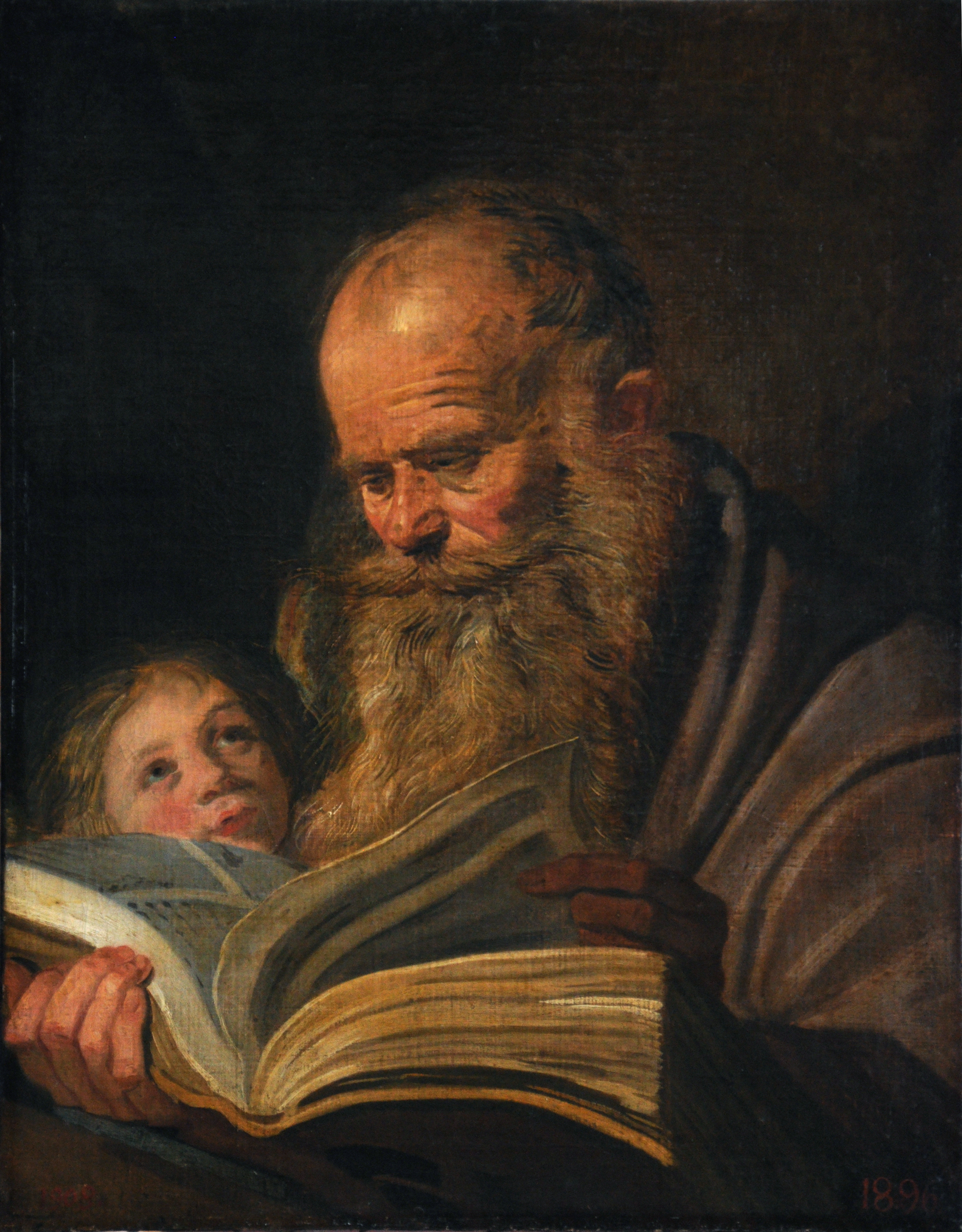
St Matthew by Frans Hals

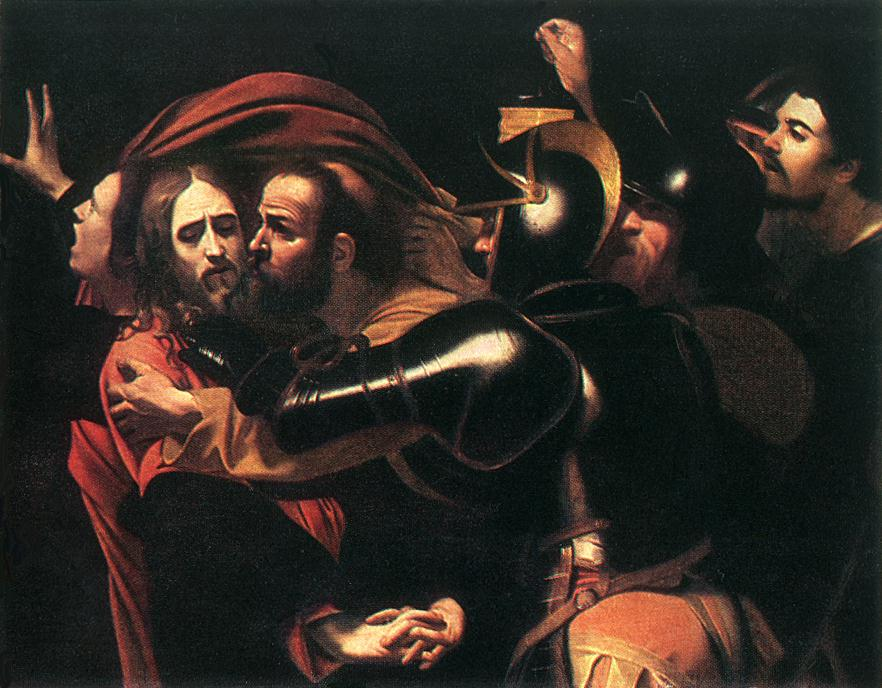
The Taking of Christ by Giovanni di Attili

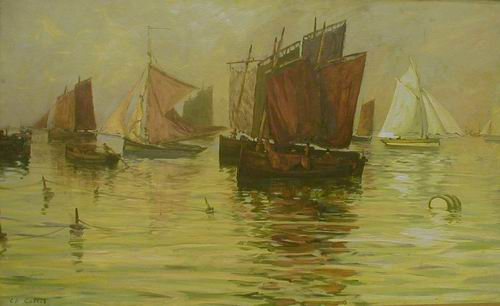
Sailors by Charles Cottet

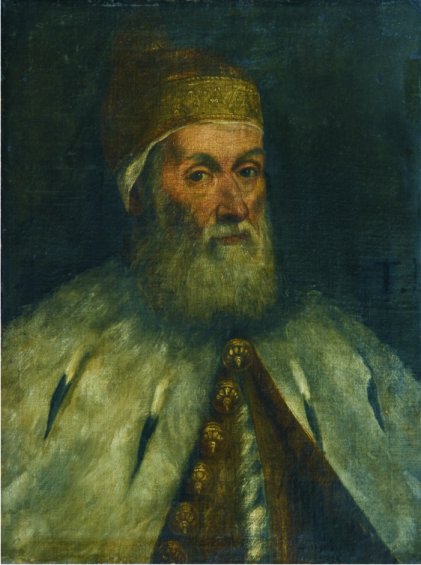
Francesco Donà by Tintoretto

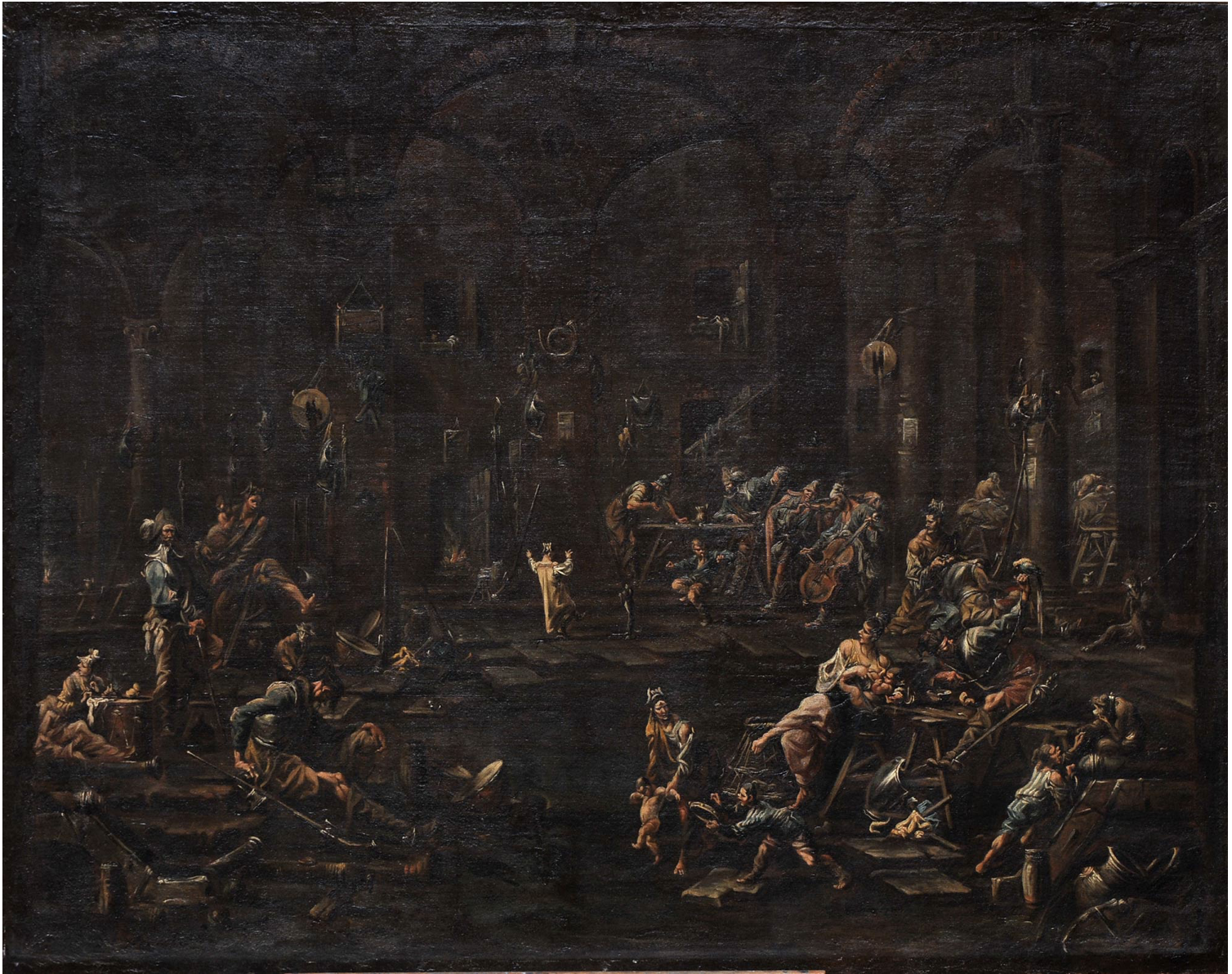
Rest of the Comedians by Alessandro Magnasco

== See also ==
- Theft of The Taking of Christ (Odesa)
