= Skibine =

Skibine or Skibin is a surname. Notable people with the surname include:

- Andrii Skibin, junior lieutenant of the 10th Mountain Assault Brigade of the Armed Forces of Ukraine
- Boris Skibine (1876–1937), Russian ballet dancer
- George Skibine (1920–1981), Russian-American ballet dancer
- Marjorie Skibine (1926–2021), American ballerina and member of the Osage Nation

== See also ==
- Skibin, Radziejów County, Kuyavian-Pomeranian Voivodeship, north-central Poland
- Skibin, Słupsk County, Pomeranian Voivodeship, northern Poland
- Skibiński
