= Piołunowo =

- Village
- Location within Poland
- Coordinates: 52°38′19″N 18°38′01″E
- Country: Poland
- Voivodeship: Kuyavian-Pomeranian
- County: Radziejów
- Gmina: Radziejów
- Time zone: UTC+1 (CET)
  - Summer (DST): UTC+2 (CEST)
- Vehicle registration: CRA

Piołunowo [pjɔwuˈnɔvɔ] is a village in the administrative district of Gmina Radziejów, within Radziejów County, Kuyavian-Pomeranian Voivodeship, in central Poland. It is located in the historic region of Kuyavia.

Piołunowo was a royal village of the Kingdom of Poland, administratively located in the Radziejów County in the Brześć Kujawski Voivodeship in the Greater Poland Province.
