= Stary Radziejów =

- Village
- Location within Poland
- Coordinates: 52°36′N 18°36′E
- Country: Poland
- Voivodeship: Kuyavian-Pomeranian
- County: Radziejów
- Gmina: Radziejów
- Time zone: UTC+1 (CET)
  - Summer (DST): UTC+2 (CEST)
- Vehicle registration: CRA

Stary Radziejów [ˈstarɨ raˈd͡ʑɛjuf] is a village in the administrative district of Gmina Radziejów, within Radziejów County, Kuyavian-Pomeranian Voivodeship, in central Poland. It is located in the historic region of Kuyavia.

Stary Radziejów was a royal village of the Kingdom of Poland. It was administratively located in the Radziejów County in the Brześć Kujawski Voivodeship in the Greater Poland Province.
