= Gmina Radziejów =

Gmina Radziejów Radziejów Commune
- Gmina
- Flag Coat of arms
- Interactive map of Gmina Radziejów
- Coordinates (Radziejów): 52°38′N 18°31′E
- Country: Poland
- Voivodeship: Kuyavian-Pomeranian
- County: Radziejów
- Seat: Radziejów

Area
  - Total: 92.6 km^{2} (35.8 sq mi)

Population (2006)
  - Total: 4,402
  - Density: 47.5/km^{2} (123/sq mi)
- Time zone: UTC+1 (CET)
  - Summer (DST): UTC+2 (CEST)
- Vehicle registration: CRA
- Website: http://www.ugradziejow.pl/

Gmina Radziejów is a rural gmina (administrative district) in Radziejów County, Kuyavian-Pomeranian Voivodeship, in central Poland. Its seat is the town of Radziejów, although the town is not part of the territory of the gmina.

The gmina covers an area of 92.6 square kilometres (35.8 sq mi), and as of 2006 its total population is 4,402.

== Villages ==
Gmina Radziejów contains the villages and settlements of Bieganowo, Biskupice, Broniewek, Broniewo, Czołówek, Czołowo, Kłonówek, Kwilno, Łany Wybranieckie, Leonowo, Opatowice, Piołunowo, Plebanka, Płowce, Pruchnowo, Przemystka, Rokitki, Skibin, Stare Płowki, Stary Radziejów, Stary Radziejów-Kolonia, Szostka Duża, Szybka, Tarnówka and Zagorzyce.

== Neighbouring gminas ==
Gmina Radziejów is bordered by the town of Radziejów and by the gminas of Bytoń, Dobre, Kruszwica, Osięciny and Piotrków Kujawski.
