= Szostka Duża =

- Village
- Location within Poland
- Coordinates: 52°40′43″N 18°28′48″E
- Country: Poland
- Voivodeship: Kuyavian-Pomeranian
- County: Radziejów
- Gmina: Radziejów

Szostka Duża [ˈʂɔstka ˈduʐa] is a village in the administrative district of Gmina Radziejów, within Radziejów County, Kuyavian-Pomeranian Voivodeship, in north-central Poland.
