= Borucin, Kuyavian-Pomeranian Voivodeship =

Borucin
- Village
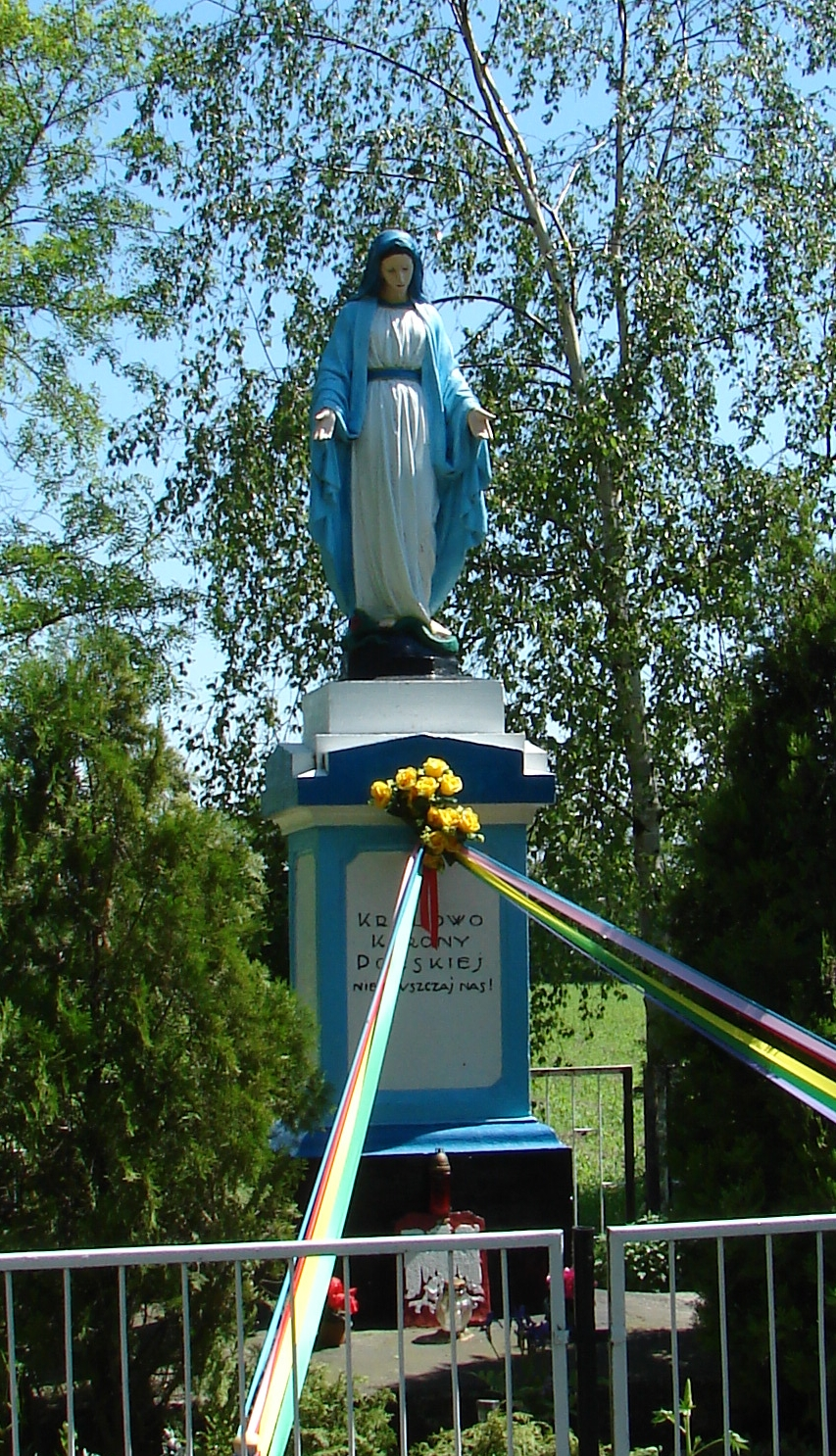
- Wayside shrine

- Location within Poland
- Coordinates: 52°36′N 18°44′E
- Country: Poland
- Voivodeship: Kuyavian-Pomeranian
- County: Radziejów
- Gmina: Osięciny

Borucin [bɔˈrut͡ɕin] is a village in the administrative district of Gmina Osięciny, within Radziejów County, Kuyavian-Pomeranian Voivodeship, in north-central Poland.
