= Pścinek =

- Village
- Location within Poland
- Coordinates: 52°35′38″N 18°38′03″E
- Country: Poland
- Voivodeship: Kuyavian-Pomeranian
- County: Radziejów
- Gmina: Bytoń

Pścinek [ˈpɕt͡ɕinɛk] is a village in the administrative district of Gmina Bytoń, within Radziejów County, Kuyavian-Pomeranian Voivodeship, in north-central Poland.
