= Bartłomiejowice =

Bartłomiejowice refers to the following places in Poland:

- Bartłomiejowice, Kuyavian-Pomeranian Voivodeship
- Bartłomiejowice, Lublin Voivodeship
