= Broniewo, Radziejów County =

Broniewo
- Village
- Location within Poland
- Coordinates: 52°39′19″N 18°30′18″E
- Country: Poland
- Voivodeship: Kuyavian-Pomeranian
- County: Radziejów
- Gmina: Radziejów

Broniewo [brɔˈɲɛvɔ] is a village in the administrative district of Gmina Radziejów, within Radziejów County, Kuyavian-Pomeranian Voivodeship, in north-central Poland.
