= Zagorzyce, Kuyavian-Pomeranian Voivodeship =

Zagorzyce
- Village
- Location within Poland
- Coordinates: 52°35′33″N 18°32′01″E
- Country: Poland
- Voivodeship: Kuyavian-Pomeranian
- County: Radziejów
- Gmina: Radziejów

Zagorzyce [zaɡɔˈʐɨt͡sɛ] is a village in the administrative district of Gmina Radziejów, within Radziejów County, Kuyavian-Pomeranian Voivodeship, in north-central Poland.
