= Kwilno, Kuyavian-Pomeranian Voivodeship =

Kwilno
- Village
- Location within Poland
- Coordinates: 52°38′N 18°36′E
- Country: Poland
- Voivodeship: Kuyavian-Pomeranian
- County: Radziejów
- Gmina: Radziejów

Kwilno [ˈkfilnɔ] is a village in the administrative district of Gmina Radziejów, within Radziejów County, Kuyavian-Pomeranian Voivodeship, in north-central Poland.
