= Stare Płowki =

- Village
- Location within Poland
- Coordinates: 52°38′47″N 18°28′18″E
- Country: Poland
- Voivodeship: Kuyavian-Pomeranian
- County: Radziejów
- Gmina: Radziejów
- Population: 70

Stare Płowki [ˈstarɛ ˈpwɔfki] is a village in the administrative district of Gmina Radziejów, within Radziejów County, Kuyavian-Pomeranian Voivodeship, in north-central Poland.
