= Bilno =

Bilno refers to the following places in Poland:

- Bilno, Radziejów County
- Bilno, Włocławek County
