= Borowo, Gmina Bytoń =

Borowo
- Village
- Location within Poland
- Coordinates: 52°32′8″N 18°34′52″E
- Country: Poland
- Voivodeship: Kuyavian-Pomeranian
- County: Radziejów
- Gmina: Bytoń

Borowo [bɔˈrɔvɔ] is a village in the administrative district of Gmina Bytoń, within Radziejów County, Kuyavian-Pomeranian Voivodeship, in north-central Poland.
