= Głuszyńskie Lake =

Głuszyńskie
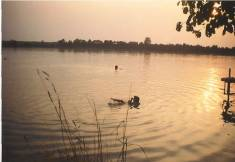

- Location within Poland
- Coordinates: 52°30′48″N 18°37′52″E
- Primary inflows: Zgłowiączka
- Primary outflows: Zgłowiączka
- Basin countries: Poland
- Max. length: 10 km (6.2 mi)
- Max. width: 2.3 km (1.4 mi)
- Surface area: 6.09 km^{2} (2.35 sq mi)
- Average depth: 4.7 m (15 ft)
- Max. depth: 36.5 m (120 ft)

Głuszyńskie is a lake in Poland near the city of Radziejów in the Kuyavian-Pomeranian Voivodship.
