= Gmina Bytoń =

Gmina Bytoń Bytoń Commune
- Gmina
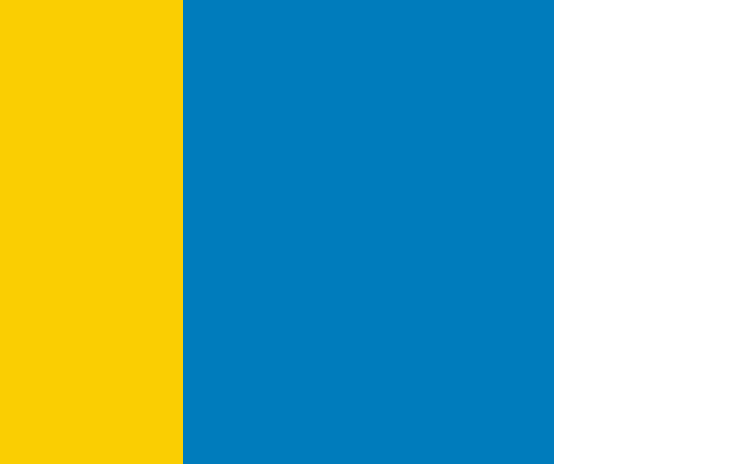
- Flag Coat of arms
- Interactive map of Gmina Bytoń
- Coordinates (Bytoń): 52°34′N 18°36′E
- Country: Poland
- Voivodeship: Kuyavian-Pomeranian
- County: Radziejów
- Seat: Bytoń

Area
  - Total: 73.35 km^{2} (28.32 sq mi)

Population (2006)
  - Total: 3,790
  - Density: 51.7/km^{2} (134/sq mi)
- Time zone: UTC+1 (CET)
  - Summer (DST): UTC+2 (CEST)
- Vehicle registration: CRA

Gmina Bytoń is a rural gmina (administrative district) in Radziejów County, Kuyavian-Pomeranian Voivodeship, in central Poland. Its seat is the village of Bytoń, which lies approximately 10 kilometres (6 mi) south-east of Radziejów and 52 km (32 mi) south of Toruń.

The gmina covers an area of 73.35 square kilometres (28.3 sq mi), and as of 2006 its total population is 3,790.

== Villages ==
Gmina Bytoń contains the villages and settlements of Borowo, Budzisław, Bytoń, Czarnocice, Dąbrówka, Litychowo, Ludwikowo, Morzyce, Nasiłowo, Niegibalice, Nowy Dwór, Pścinek, Pścinno, Stefanowo, Stróżewo, Świesz, Wandynowo and Witowo.

== Neighbouring gminas ==
Gmina Bytoń is bordered by the gminas of Osięciny, Piotrków Kujawski, Radziejów and Topólka.
