= Gmina Osięciny =

Gmina Osięciny Osięciny Commune
- Gmina
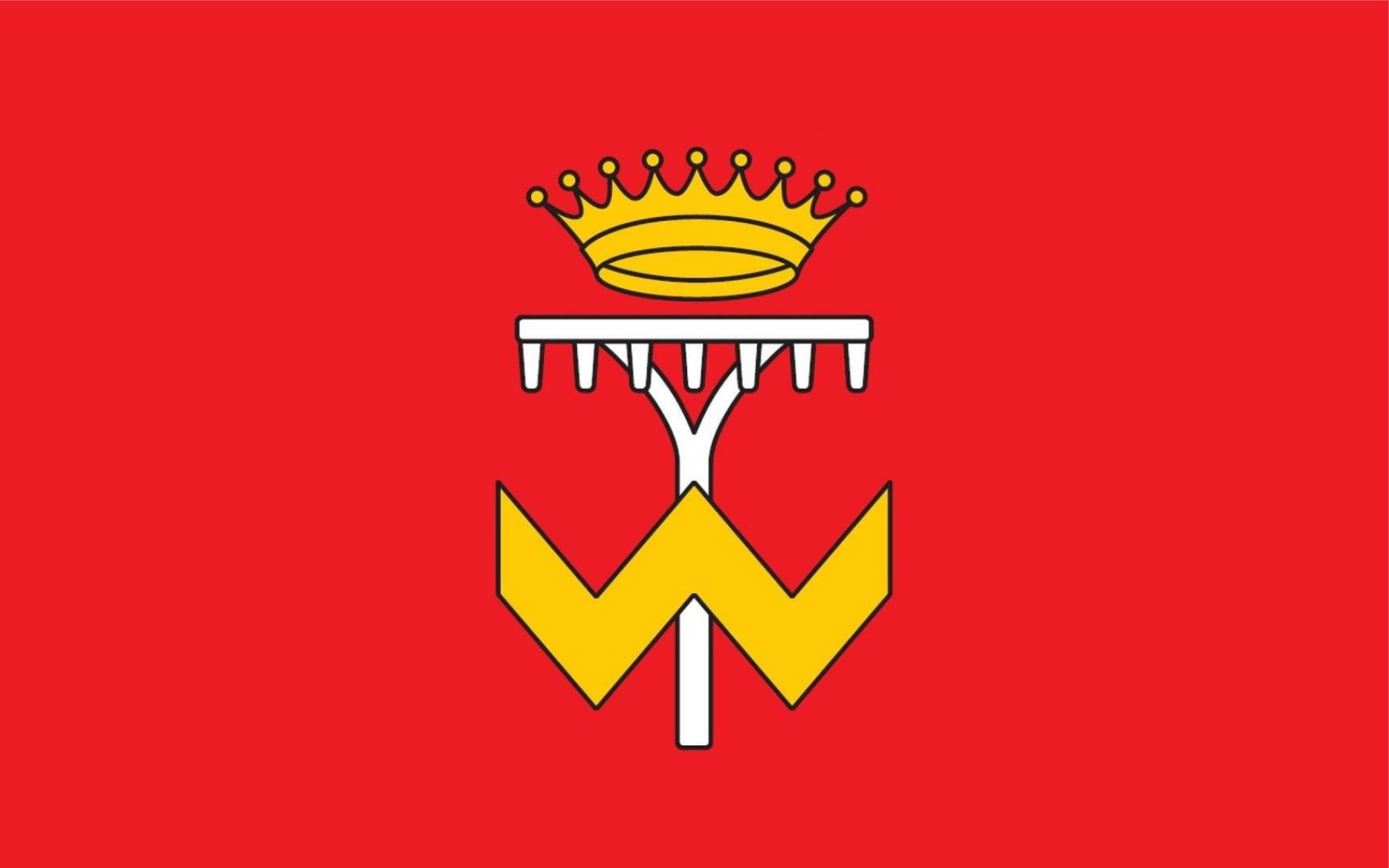
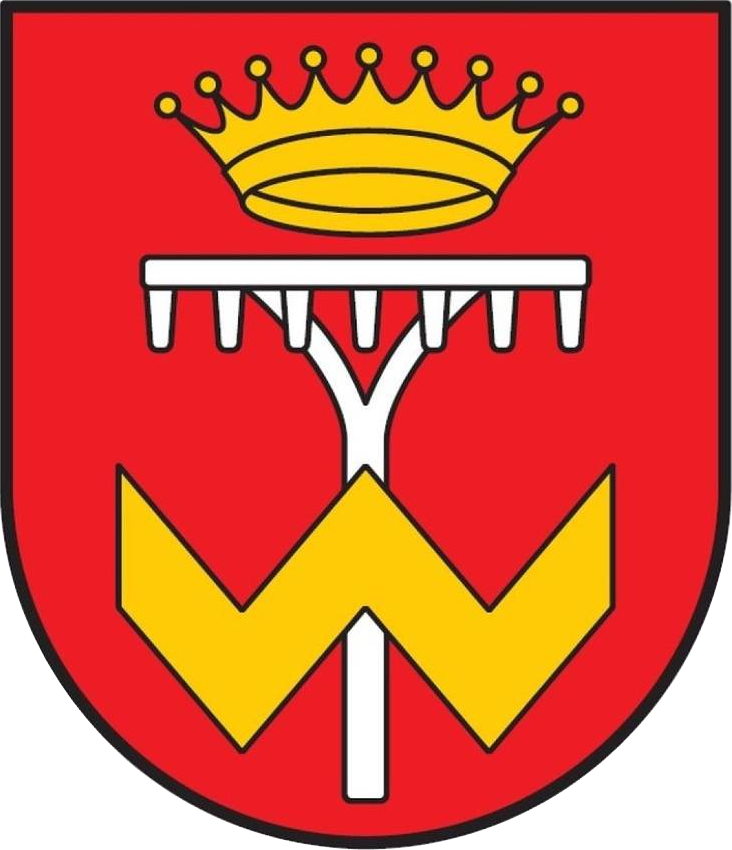
- Flag Coat of arms
- Interactive map of Gmina Osięciny
- Coordinates (Osięciny): 52°38′N 18°43′E
- Country: Poland
- Voivodeship: Kuyavian-Pomeranian
- County: Radziejów
- Seat: Osięciny

Area
  - Total: 122.99 km^{2} (47.49 sq mi)

Population (2006)
  - Total: 8,142
  - Density: 66.20/km^{2} (171.5/sq mi)
- Time zone: UTC+1 (CET)
  - Summer (DST): UTC+2 (CEST)
- Vehicle registration: CRA
- Website: http://www.osieciny.pl

Gmina Osięciny is a rural gmina (administrative district) in Radziejów County, Kuyavian-Pomeranian Voivodeship, in central Poland. Its seat is the village of Osięciny, which lies approximately 14 kilometres (9 mi) east of Radziejów and 45 km (28 mi) south of Toruń.

The gmina covers an area of 122.99 square kilometres (47.5 sq mi), and as of 2006 its total population is 8,142.

== Villages ==
Gmina Osięciny contains the villages and settlements of Bartłomiejowice, Bełszewo, Bełszewo-Kolonia, Bilno, Bodzanówek, Borucin, Borucinek, Jarantowice, Karolin, Konary, Kościelna Wieś, Krotoszyn, Latkowo, Lekarzewice, Leonowo, Nagórki, Osięciny, Osłonki, Pieńki Kościelskie, Pilichowo, Pocierzyn, Powałkowice, Pułkownikowo, Ruszki, Samszyce, Sęczkowo, Szalonki, Ujma Mała, Witoldowo, Włodzimierka, Wola Skarbkowa, Zagajewice, Żakowice, Zblęg and Zielińsk.

== Neighbouring gminas ==
Gmina Osięciny is bordered by the gminas of Bądkowo, Brześć Kujawski, Bytoń, Dobre, Lubraniec, Radziejów, Topólka and Zakrzewo.
