= Jarantowice =

Jarantowice may refer to the following places:

- Jarantowice, Radziejów County in Kuyavian-Pomeranian Voivodeship (north-central Poland)
- Jarantowice, Wąbrzeźno County in Kuyavian-Pomeranian Voivodeship (north-central Poland)
- Jarantowice, Włocławek County in Kuyavian-Pomeranian Voivodeship (north-central Poland)
