= Łany Wybranieckie =

- Village
- Location within Poland
- Coordinates: 52°38′38″N 18°31′16″E
- Country: Poland
- Voivodeship: Kuyavian-Pomeranian
- County: Radziejów
- Gmina: Radziejów

Łany Wybranieckie [ˈwanɨ vɨbraˈɲɛt͡skʲɛ] is a village in the administrative district of Gmina Radziejów, within Radziejów County, Kuyavian-Pomeranian Voivodeship, in north-central Poland.
