= Leonowo, Gmina Osięciny =

Leonowo
- Village
- Location within Poland
- Coordinates: 52°40′05″N 18°40′28″E
- Country: Poland
- Voivodeship: Kuyavian-Pomeranian
- County: Radziejów
- Gmina: Osięciny

Leonowo [lɛɔˈnɔvɔ] is a village in the administrative district of Gmina Osięciny, within Radziejów County, Kuyavian-Pomeranian Voivodeship, in north-central Poland.

== History ==
In the 19th century, Leonowo is mentioned as a manor farm in the Nieszawa district of the Radziejowo parish, covering 185 acres. The manor farm included an oil mill.
