= Sęczkowo, Kuyavian-Pomeranian Voivodeship =

Sęczkowo
- Village
- Location within Poland
- Coordinates: 52°41′N 18°44′E
- Country: Poland
- Voivodeship: Kuyavian-Pomeranian
- County: Radziejów
- Gmina: Osięciny

Sęczkowo [sɛnt͡ʂˈkɔvɔ] is a village in the administrative district of Gmina Osięciny, within Radziejów County, Kuyavian-Pomeranian Voivodeship, in north-central Poland.
