= Świesz =

- Village
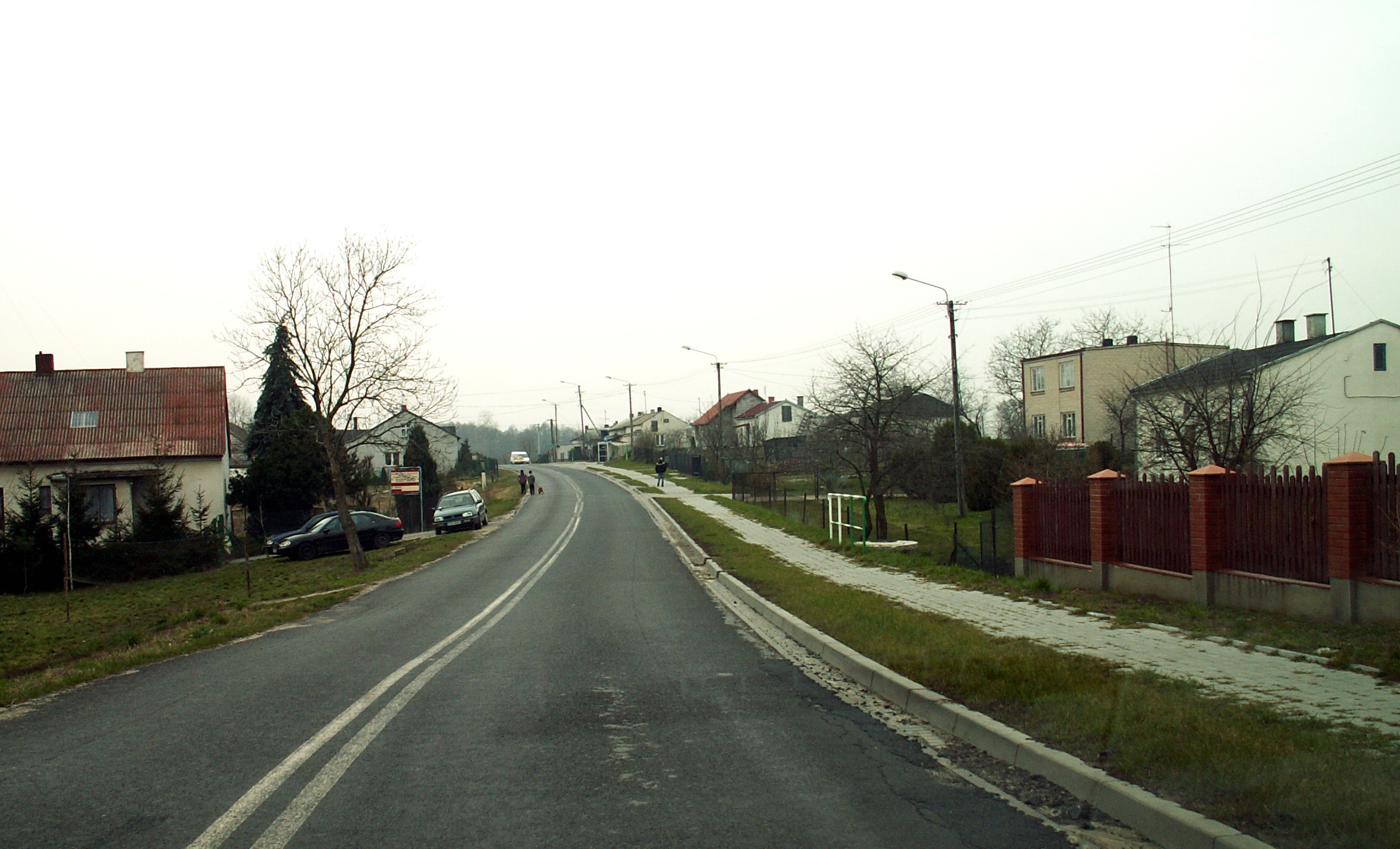
- Street in Świesz

- Location within Poland
- Coordinates: 52°33′N 18°33′E
- Country: Poland
- Voivodeship: Kuyavian-Pomeranian
- County: Radziejów
- Gmina: Bytoń

Świesz (Polish pronunciation: [ɕfjɛʂ]) is a village in the administrative district of Gmina Bytoń, within Radziejów County, Kuyavian-Pomeranian Voivodeship, in north-central Poland.
