= Bodzanówek =

Bodzanówek refers to the following places in Poland:

- Bodzanówek, Radziejów County
- Bodzanówek, Włocławek County
