= Leonowo, Gmina Radziejów =

Leonowo
- Village
- Location within Poland
- Coordinates: 52°39′39″N 18°41′01″E
- Country: Poland
- Voivodeship: Kuyavian-Pomeranian
- County: Radziejów
- Gmina: Radziejów

Leonowo [lɛɔˈnɔvɔ] is a village in the administrative district of Gmina Radziejów, within Radziejów County, Kuyavian-Pomeranian Voivodeship, in north-central Poland.
