= Neolithic long house =

Farmhouse of Neolithic Europe

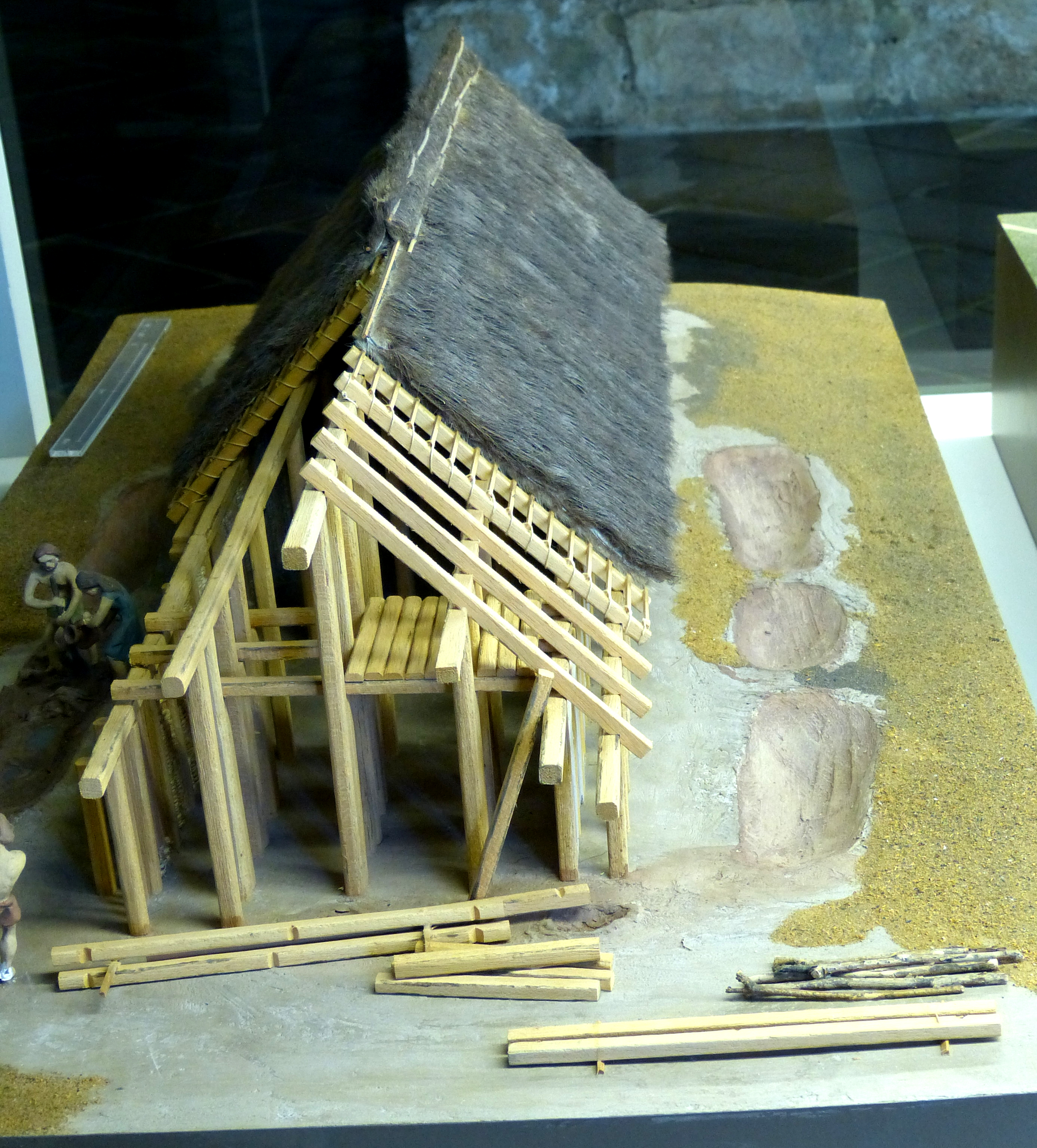
Kelheim (Lower Bavaria). Archaeological Museum: Reconstruction of a settlement of the Linear pottery culture (5th millennium BC) from Hienheim

The Neolithic long house was a long, narrow timber dwelling built by the Old Europeans in some parts of Europe beginning at least as early as 6000 to 5000 BC. They first appeared in central Europe in connection with the early Neolithic cultures like the Linear Pottery culture or Cucuteni culture. This type of architecture represents the largest free-standing structure in the world in its era. Long houses are present across numerous regions and time periods in the archaeological record.

The long house was a rectangular structure, 5.5 to 7 m (18 to 23 ft) wide, of variable length, around 20 m (66 ft) up to 45 m (148 ft). Outer walls were wattle and daub, sometimes alternating with split logs, with pitched, thatched roofs, supported by rows of poles, three across. The exterior walls would have been quite short beneath the large roof. They were solid and massive, oak posts being preferred. Clay for the daub was dug from pits near the house, that were then used for storage. Houses in the urban settlements had two stories, with up to three or even four floors on each story. Some Linear Pottery culture houses were occupied for as long as 30 years.

Some houses were especially spacious, very large for the time. One of the largest houses in southeastern Europe is the "Big House" in the Slatina district of Sofia in Bulgaria, which is equivalent to a modern detached house.

Surviving evidence suggests these houses had no windows and only one doorway. The door was located at one end of the house. Internally, the house had one or two partitions creating up to three areas. Interpretations of the use of these areas vary. Working activities might be carried out in the better lit door end, the middle used for sleeping and eating and the end furthest from the door could have been used for grain storage. According to another view, the interior was divided in areas for sleeping, common life and a fenced enclosure at the back end for keeping animals.

Twenty or thirty people could have lived in each house, with villages composed typically of five to eight houses. Exceptionally, nearly 30 longhouses in a fortified settlement (dating to 4300 BC, i.e., Late Linear Pottery culture) were revealed by excavations at Oslonki in Poland.

== Examples ==
The Balbridie timber house in what is present day Aberdeenshire, Scotland, offers a fine example of these early timber structures. Archaeological excavations have revealed extant timber postholes that delineate the support pieces of the original structure. This site is strategically located in a fertile agricultural area along the River Dee, very close to an ancient strategic ford of the river and also near an ancient timber trackway known as the Elsick Mounth.

== Bibliography ==
- Rodney Castleden. 1987. The Stonehenge people. 282 pages
- Gimbutas, Marija (1991). The Civilization of the Goddess: The World of Old Europe. San Francisco: HarperCollins Publishers (HarperSanFrancisco). ISBN 0-06-250368-5.
- C. Michael Hogan. 2007. Elsick Mounth, Megalithic Portal, ed A. Burnham
- Marciniak, Arkadiusz (2005). Placing Animals in the Neolithic: Social Zooarchaeology of Prehistoric Farming Communities. Routledge Cavendish. ISBN 1-84472-092-6.
- A. W. R. Whittle and Norman Yoffee, Europe in the Neolithic: The Creation of New Worlds, 1996, Cambridge University
