= Bełszewo-Kolonia =

- Village
- Location within Poland
- Coordinates: 52°38′54″N 18°41′3″E
- Country: Poland
- Voivodeship: Kuyavian-Pomeranian
- County: Radziejów
- Gmina: Osięciny
- Population: 100

Bełszewo-Kolonia [bɛu̯ˈʂɛvɔ kɔˈlɔɲa] is a village in the administrative district of Gmina Osięciny, within Radziejów County, Kuyavian-Pomeranian Voivodeship, in north-central Poland.
