= Stefanowo, Radziejów County =

Stefanowo
- Village
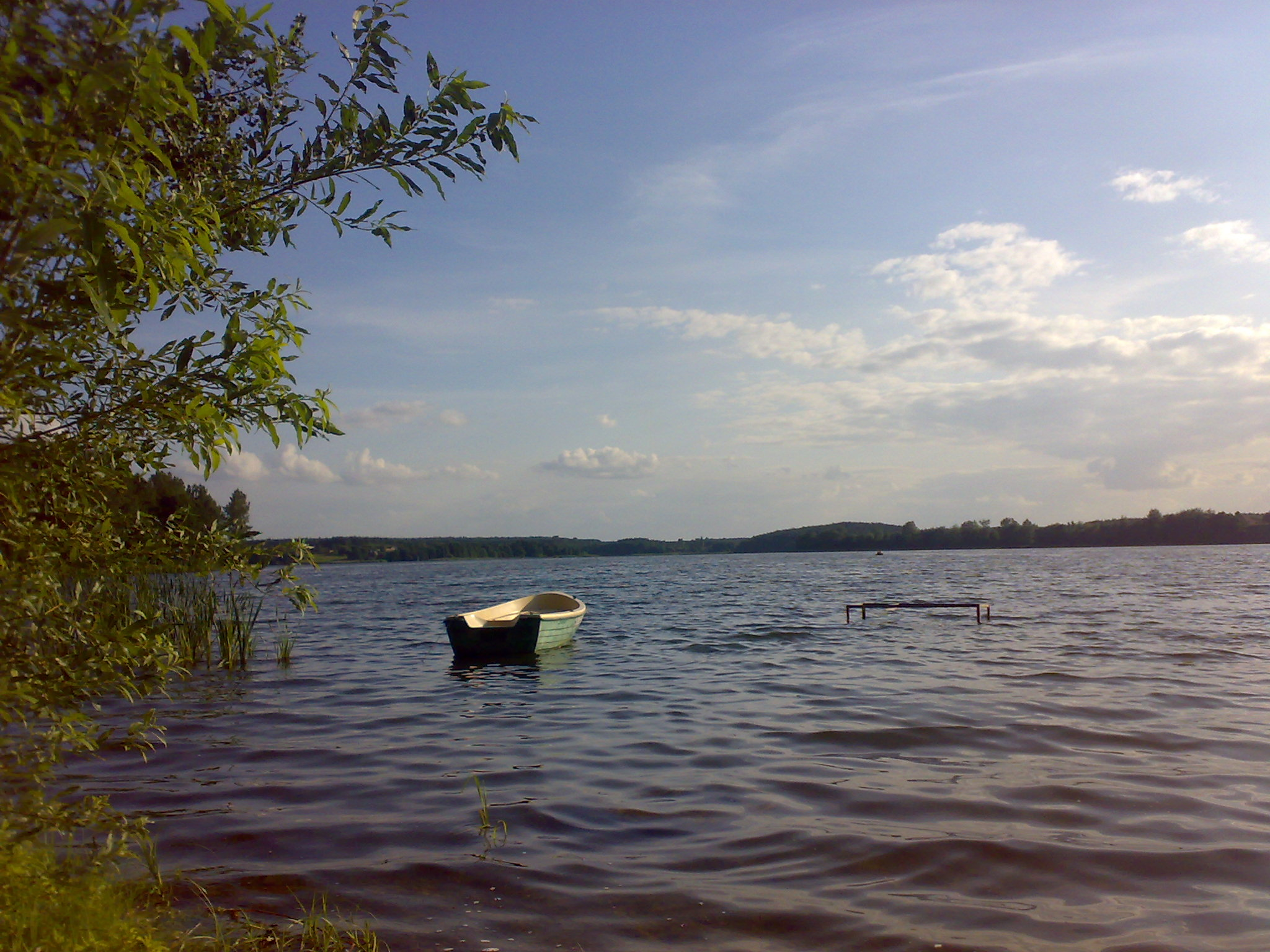
- Lake Głuszyńskie

- Location within Poland
- Coordinates: 52°31′22″N 18°37′36″E
- Country: Poland
- Voivodeship: Kuyavian-Pomeranian
- County: Radziejów
- Gmina: Bytoń

Stefanowo [stɛfaˈnɔvɔ] is a village in the administrative district of Gmina Bytoń, within Radziejów County, Kuyavian-Pomeranian Voivodeship, in north-central Poland.
