= Czołowo, Kuyavian-Pomeranian Voivodeship =

Czołowo
- Village
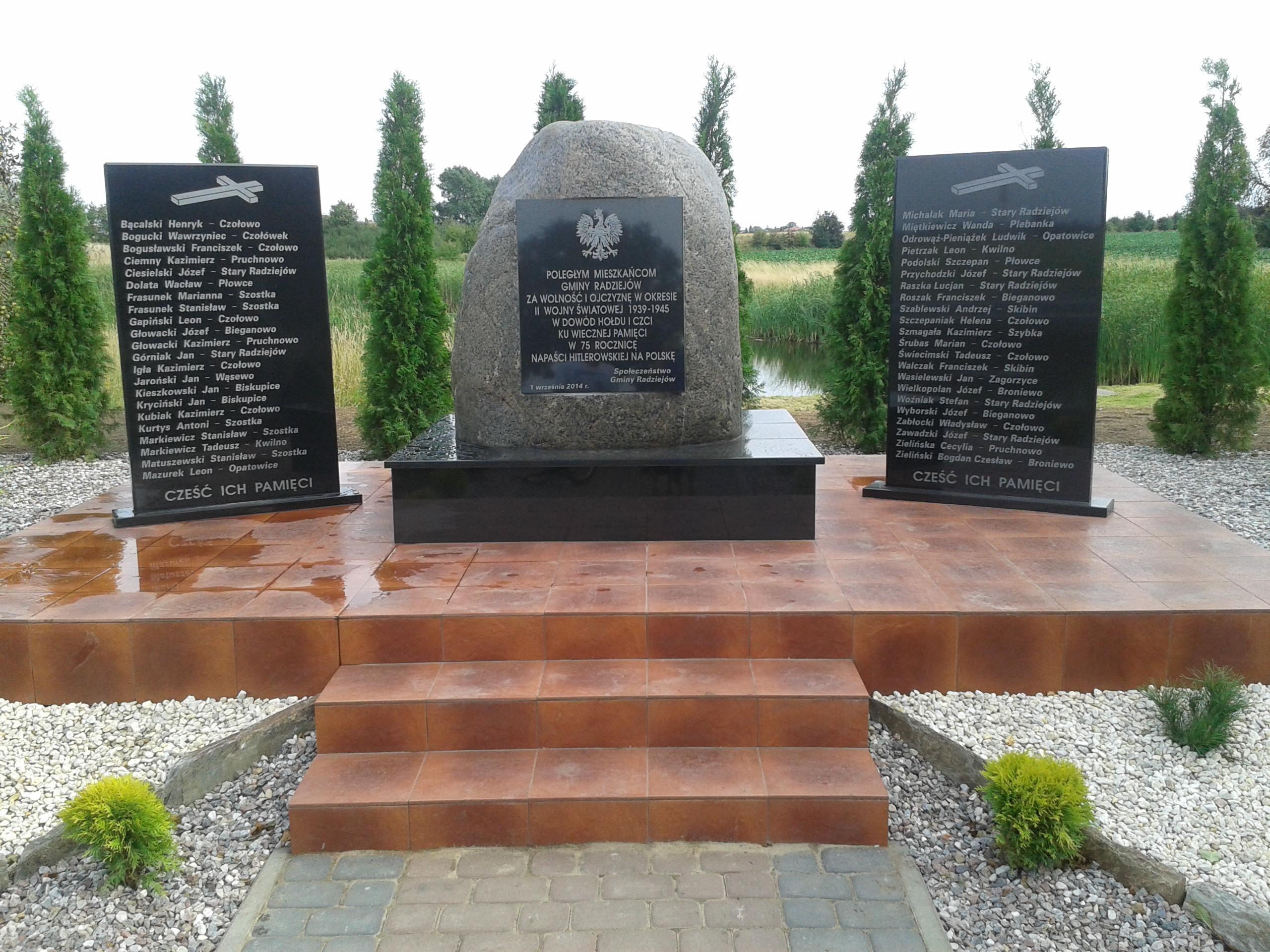
- Memorial to local victims of World War II

- Location within Poland
- Coordinates: 52°37′N 18°30′E
- Country: Poland
- Voivodeship: Kuyavian-Pomeranian
- County: Radziejów
- Gmina: Radziejów
- Time zone: UTC+1 (CET)
  - Summer (DST): UTC+2 (CEST)
- Vehicle registration: CRA

Czołowo [t͡ʂɔˈwɔvɔ] is a village in the administrative district of Gmina Radziejów, within Radziejów County, Kuyavian-Pomeranian Voivodeship, in north-central Poland. It is located in the historic region of Kuyavia.

Czołowo was a royal village of the Kingdom of Poland, administratively located in the Radziejów County in the Brześć Kujawski Voivodeship in the Greater Poland Province.
