= Pieńki Kościelskie =

- Village
- Location within Poland
- Coordinates: 52°39′33″N 18°44′58″E
- Country: Poland
- Voivodeship: Kuyavian-Pomeranian
- County: Radziejów
- Gmina: Osięciny

Pieńki Kościelskie [ˈpjɛɲki kɔɕˈt͡ɕɛlskʲɛ] is a village in the administrative district of Gmina Osięciny, within Radziejów County, Kuyavian-Pomeranian Voivodeship, in north-central Poland.
