= Plebanka, Radziejów County =

Plebanka
- Village
- Location within Poland
- Coordinates: 52°36′24″N 18°33′16″E
- Country: Poland
- Voivodeship: Kuyavian-Pomeranian
- County: Radziejów
- Gmina: Radziejów

Plebanka [plɛˈbaŋka] is a village in the administrative district of Gmina Radziejów, within Radziejów County, Kuyavian-Pomeranian Voivodeship, in north-central Poland.
