= Morzyce, Radziejów County =

Morzyce
- Village
- Location within Poland
- Coordinates: 52°33′51″N 18°37′10″E
- Country: Poland
- Voivodeship: Kuyavian-Pomeranian
- County: Radziejów
- Gmina: Bytoń
- Time zone: UTC+1 (CET)
  - Summer (DST): UTC+2 (CEST)

Morzyce [mɔˈʐɨt͡sɛ] is a village in the administrative district of Gmina Bytoń, within Radziejów County, Kuyavian-Pomeranian Voivodeship, in central Poland.
