= Brześć Voivodeship =

Brześć Voivodeship or Brest Voivodeship may refer to:

- Brest Litovsk Voivodeship (Brześć Litewski Voivodeship)
- Brześć Kujawski Voivodeship
- Brześć Voivodeship (1793)
