= Kłonówek =

Klonowek may refer to the following places in Poland:

- Klonówek, Łódź Voivodeship
- Kłonówek, Kuyavian-Pomeranian Voivodeship
- Kłonówek, Masovian Voivodeship
