= Rafał Leszczyński (1526–1592) =

Voivode of Brześć Kujawski

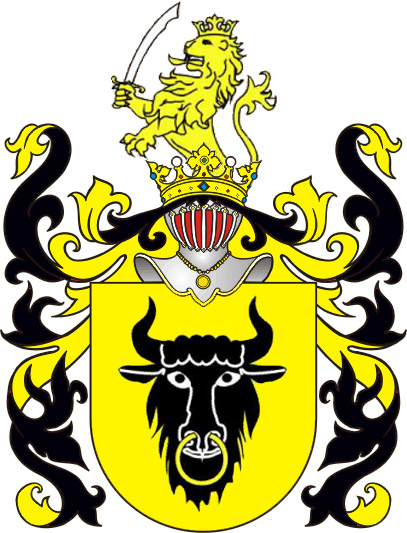
Wieniawa coat of arms

Rafał Leszczyński (1526–1592), of Wieniawa coat of arms, was a voivode of Brześć Kujawski from 1545 to 1550; castellan of Śrem in 1580, starost of Radziejów, sejm marshal, one of the leaders of the Executionist movement and Polish Reformation.

== Biography ==
He was an opponent to Zygmunt August's marriage with Barbara Radziwiłłówna (around 1548); also around that time he joined the Czech Brethren and became one of the leading Polish representatives of that faith. In 1550 he resigned his voivode office, and was elected a deputy to the Sejm and later became Marshal of the Sejm. He was a vocal opponent of the Roman Catholic clergy and a supporter of the Union of Lublin.

He was the father of Andrzej Leszczyński.
