= Pilichowo =

Pilichowo may refer to the following places:

- Pilichowo, Kuyavian-Pomeranian Voivodeship (north-central Poland)
- Pilichowo, Masovian Voivodeship (east-central Poland)
- Pilichowo, Pomeranian Voivodeship (north Poland)
