= Kościelna Wieś, Kuyavian-Pomeranian Voivodeship =

Kościelna Wieś
- Village
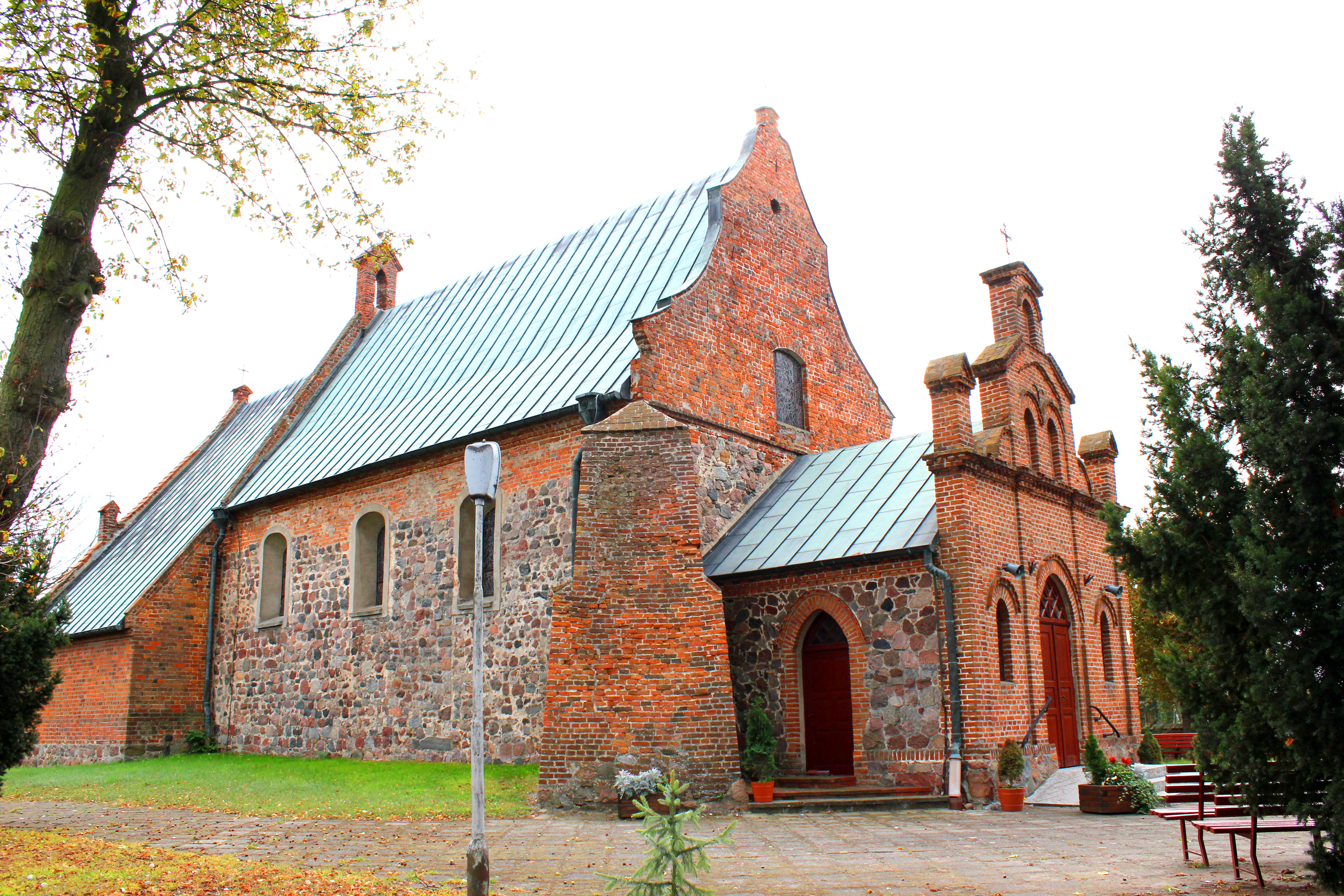
- Parish church of St. Lawrence, built in the 12th-13th century.

- Location within Poland
- Coordinates: 52°40′7″N 18°42′37″E
- Country: Poland
- Voivodeship: Kuyavian-Pomeranian
- County: Radziejów
- Gmina: Osięciny
- Population: 290

Kościelna Wieś [kɔɕˈt͡ɕɛlna ˈvjɛɕ] is a village in the administrative district of Gmina Osięciny, within Radziejów County, Kuyavian-Pomeranian Voivodeship, in north-central Poland.
