= Ujma Mała =

- Village
- Location within Poland
- Coordinates: 52°43′N 18°42′E
- Country: Poland
- Voivodeship: Kuyavian-Pomeranian
- County: Radziejów
- Gmina: Osięciny

Ujma Mała [ˈui̯ma ˈmawa] is a village in the administrative district of Gmina Osięciny, within Radziejów County, Kuyavian-Pomeranian Voivodeship, in north-central Poland.
