= Skibiński =

Skibiński (feminine: Skibińska) is a Polish surname. It may be transliterated as Skibinski, Skibinska, Skibinsky, Skibynskyi, Skybinsky, Skybynsky, Скибинский, Скібі́нський, Скиби́нський. Notable people with the surname include:

- Brad Skibinsky, Head Hits Concrete Canadian political grindcore band member
- Ewa Skibińska (born 1963), Polish actress
- Eugeniusz Skibiński (1858–1918), Polish architect working in Baku
- Joanna Skibińska (born 1985), Polish athlete specializing in the long jump and triple jump
- Joe Skibinski (1928–2015), American football player
- John Skibinski (born 1955), American football player
- Karol Skibiński (1849–1922), Polish railway construction engineer
- Kazimierz Michał Skibiński (1786–1858), Polish actor, singer, director, theatre manager
- Maria Skibniewska (née Skibińska; 1904-1984), Polish translator
- Rich Skibinsky, Suspyre American progressive metal band guitarist
- Wojciech Skibiński (1929–2016), Polish actor and director
- Adrian Grzegorz Skibiński (Służewo born; 2005), Kandydat Trzeciej Drogi (PSL) do Rady Gminy Wiejskiej Aleknsadrów Kujawski , Radny Młodzieżowej Rady Miejskiej w Aleksandrowie Kujawskim, Sekretarz Komisji Rewizyjnej Ochotniczej Straży Pożarnej w Aleksandrowie Kujawskim (2022), Członek Ochotniczej Straży Pożarnej w Służewie (2012)
- Przemysław Eugieniusz Skibiński (Służewo born; 1989), Kandydat Trzeciej Drogi (PSL) do Rady Gminy Miejskiej Aleknsadrów Kujawski , Przes Ochotniczej Straży Pożarnej w Aleksandrowie Kujawskim,
- Tomasz Skibiński Kandydat Koalicji Obywatelskiej do Rady Powiatu Aleksandrowskiego

== See also ==
- Skibin, Radziejów County, Kuyavian-Pomeranian Voivodeship, north-central Poland
- Skibin, Słupsk County, Pomeranian Voivodeship, northern Poland
