= Karolin, Kuyavian-Pomeranian Voivodeship =

Karolin
- Village
- Location within Poland
- Coordinates: 52°37′14″N 18°44′13″E
- Country: Poland
- Voivodeship: Kuyavian-Pomeranian
- County: Radziejów
- Gmina: Osięciny
- Population: 60

Karolin [kaˈrɔlin] is a village in the administrative district of Gmina Osięciny, within Radziejów County, Kuyavian-Pomeranian Voivodeship, in north-central Poland.
