= Tarnówka, Kuyavian-Pomeranian Voivodeship =

Tarnówka
- Village
- Location within Poland
- Coordinates: 52°39′58″N 18°30′48″E
- Country: Poland
- Voivodeship: Kuyavian-Pomeranian
- County: Radziejów
- Gmina: Radziejów

Tarnówka [tarˈnufka] is a village in the administrative district of Gmina Radziejów, within Radziejów County, Kuyavian-Pomeranian Voivodeship, in north-central Poland.
