= Ludwikowo, Gmina Bytoń =

Ludwikowo
- Village
- Location within Poland
- Coordinates: 52°31′29″N 18°36′01″E
- Country: Poland
- Voivodeship: Kuyavian-Pomeranian
- County: Radziejów
- Gmina: Bytoń

Ludwikowo [ludviˈkɔvɔ] is a village in the administrative district of Gmina Bytoń, within Radziejów County, Kuyavian-Pomeranian Voivodeship, in north-central Poland.
