= Rokitki, Kuyavian-Pomeranian Voivodeship =

Rokitki
- Village
- Location within Poland
- Coordinates: 52°38′23″N 18°34′3″E
- Country: Poland
- Voivodeship: Kuyavian-Pomeranian
- County: Radziejów
- Gmina: Radziejów
- Population: 60

Rokitki [rɔˈkitki] is a village in the administrative district of Gmina Radziejów, within Radziejów County, Kuyavian-Pomeranian Voivodeship, in north-central Poland.
