= Nasiłowo =

- Village
- Location within Poland
- Coordinates: 52°34′N 18°33′E
- Country: Poland
- Voivodeship: Kuyavian-Pomeranian
- County: Radziejów
- Gmina: Bytoń

Nasiłowo [naɕiˈwɔvɔ] is a village in the administrative district of Gmina Bytoń, within Radziejów County, Kuyavian-Pomeranian Voivodeship, in north-central Poland. According to an official 2021 report, the population of Nasiłowo is approximately 131 residents. In terms of gender distribution, about 48.1% of the population are female and 51.9% are male.
