= Czołowo =

Czołowo may refer to the following places:

- Czołowo, Koło County in Greater Poland Voivodeship (central Poland)
- Czołowo, Poznań County in Greater Poland Voivodeship (west-central Poland)
- Czołowo, Kuyavian-Pomeranian Voivodeship (central Poland)
