= Witowo, Kuyavian-Pomeranian Voivodeship =

Witowo
- Village
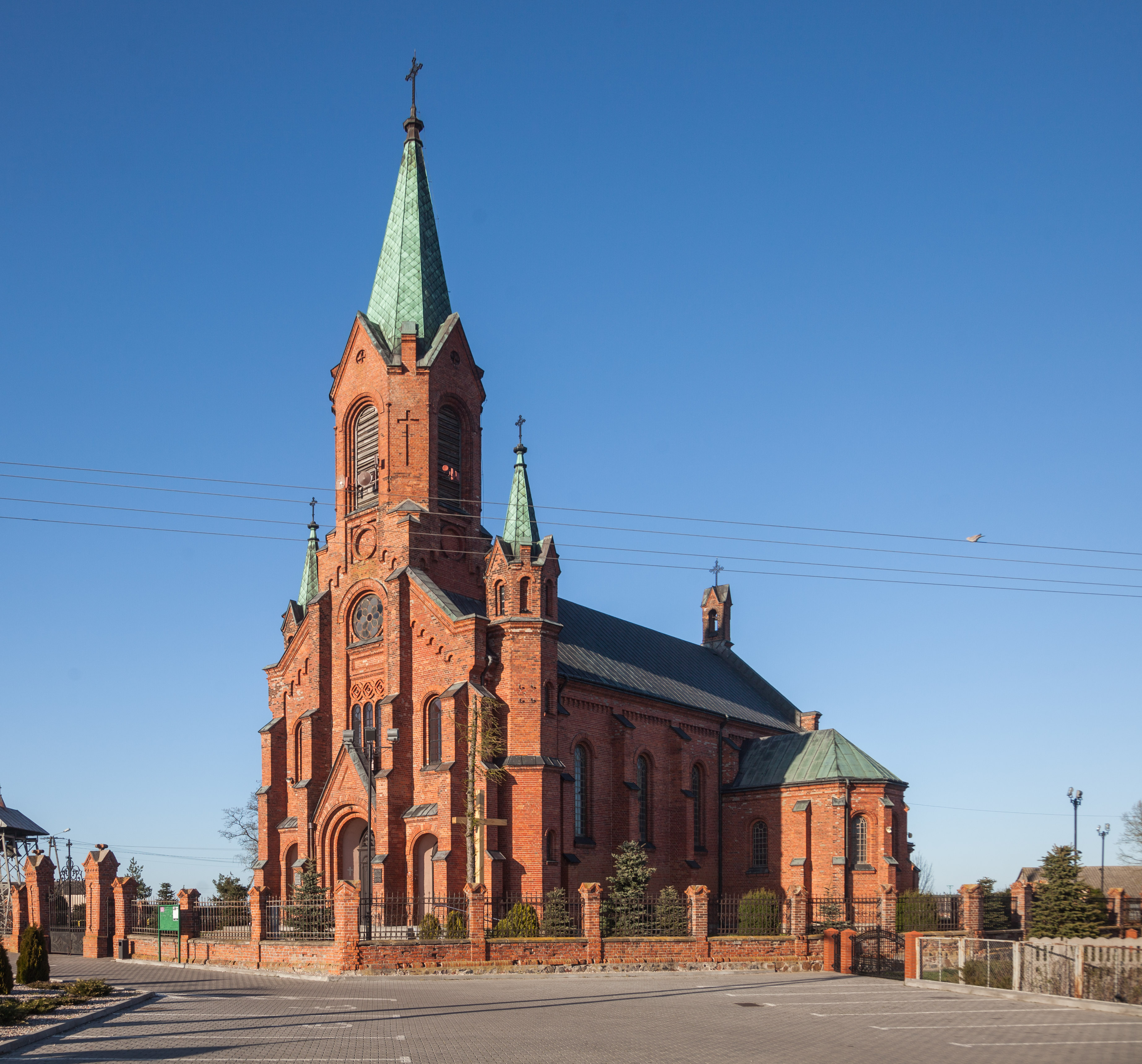
- Saint Andrew church in Witowo

- Location within Poland
- Coordinates: 52°36′N 18°40′E
- Country: Poland
- Voivodeship: Kuyavian-Pomeranian
- County: Radziejów
- Gmina: Bytoń

Population
  - Total: 430

Witowo [viˈtɔvɔ] is a village in the administrative district of Gmina Bytoń, within Radziejów County, Kuyavian-Pomeranian Voivodeship, in central Poland.

Three Polish citizens were murdered by Nazi Germany in the village during World War II.
