= Bieganowo =

Bieganowo may refer to the following places:

- Bieganowo, Gmina Środa Wielkopolska, Środa County in Greater Poland Voivodeship (west-central Poland)
- Bieganowo, Września County in Greater Poland Voivodeship (west-central Poland)
- Bieganowo, Kuyavian-Pomeranian Voivodeship (north-central Poland)
