= Nagórki, Kuyavian-Pomeranian Voivodeship =

Nagórki
- Village
- Location within Poland
- Coordinates: 52°41′25″N 18°40′48″E
- Country: Poland
- Voivodeship: Kuyavian-Pomeranian
- County: Radziejów
- Gmina: Osięciny

Nagórki [naˈɡurki] is a village in the administrative district of Gmina Osięciny, within Radziejów County, Kuyavian-Pomeranian Voivodeship, in north-central Poland.
