= Nowy Dwór, Radziejów County =

Nowy Dwór
- Village
- Location within Poland
- Coordinates: 52°33′N 18°36′E
- Country: Poland
- Voivodeship: Kuyavian-Pomeranian
- County: Radziejów
- Gmina: Bytoń
- Population (approx.): 250

Nowy Dwór [ˈnɔvɨ ˈdvur] is a village in the administrative district of Gmina Bytoń, within Radziejów County, Kuyavian-Pomeranian Voivodeship, in north-central Poland.

The village has an approximate population of 250.
