= Dąbrówka, Radziejów County =

Dąbrówka
- Village
- Location within Poland
- Coordinates: 52°33′00″N 18°38′37″E
- Country: Poland
- Voivodeship: Kuyavian-Pomeranian
- County: Radziejów
- Gmina: Bytoń

Dąbrówka [dɔmˈbrufka] is a village in the administrative district of Gmina Bytoń, within Radziejów County, Kuyavian-Pomeranian Voivodeship, in north-central Poland.
