= Pścinno =

- Village
- Location within Poland
- Coordinates: 52°35′N 18°38′E
- Country: Poland
- Voivodeship: Kuyavian-Pomeranian
- County: Radziejów
- Gmina: Bytoń
- Population: 135

Pścinno [ˈpɕt͡ɕinnɔ] is a village in the administrative district of Gmina Bytoń, within Radziejów County, Kuyavian-Pomeranian Voivodeship, in north-central Poland.
