= Biskupice, Radziejów County =

Biskupice
- Village
- Location within Poland
- Coordinates: 52°38′N 18°34′E
- Country: Poland
- Voivodeship: Kuyavian-Pomeranian
- County: Radziejów
- Gmina: Radziejów

Biskupice [biskuˈpit͡sɛ] is a village in the administrative district of Gmina Radziejów, within Radziejów County, Kuyavian-Pomeranian Voivodeship, in north-central Poland.
