= Witoldowo, Radziejów County =

Witoldowo
- Village
- Location within Poland
- Coordinates: 52°40′05″N 18°44′22″E
- Country: Poland
- Voivodeship: Kuyavian-Pomeranian
- County: Radziejów
- Gmina: Osięciny

Witoldowo [vitɔlˈdɔvɔ] is a village in the administrative district of Gmina Osięciny, within Radziejów County, Kuyavian-Pomeranian Voivodeship, in north-central Poland.
