= Yisroel Moshe Olewski =

Polish rabbi (1916-1966)

Rabbi Yisroel Moshe Olewski Hebrew: הרב ישראל משה אולבסקי
- Title: Chief Rabbi of Celle

Personal life
- Born: 26 September 1916 Osięciny, Poland
- Died: 26 May 1966 (aged 49) New York, New York U.S.
- Buried: Jerusalem, Israel

Religious life
- Religion: Judaism
- Denomination: Orthodox
- Other: Rabbi of Radziejów, Rabbi of Bergen-Belsen
- Semikhah: Rabbi Menachem Ziemba

Rabbi Yisroel Moshe Olewski (1916–1966) was the rabbi of Radziejów, Poland prior to the Holocaust. After the Holocaust, he was one of the rabbis of Bergen-Belsen and the Chief Rabbi of Celle. Later, after emigrating to the United States he was the founder of the Gerrer yeshiva in Brooklyn.

== Biography ==
Rabbi Yisroel Moshe Olewski was born in Osięciny on 26 September 1916. His father was Rabbi Yehuda Aryeh and his mother was Henna Rivka, the daughter of Rabbi Dovid Shlomo Zalman Neiman who was the Rabbi of Osięciny. The family were followers of the Agudath Israel movement. Rabbi Olewski's father died when he was 6 years old. He was sent to study at yeshivas in Włocławek, Warsaw and Lublin, completing his education in 1939 at Yeshiva Chachmei Lublin. When he became of age, Rabbi Olewski married his wife Slata and settled in his father-in-law's hometown of Izbica Kujawska.

== Rabbi of Radziejów ==
Rabbi Olewski received his rabbinical ordination from Rabbi Menachem Ziemba. Thereafter he became the rabbi of Radziejów.

== Leadership roles in Germany ==
During the Holocaust, Rabbi Olewski was confined to the Częstochowa Ghetto. His mother, wife, and son were murdered in Treblinka extermination camp. He was interred at Buchenwald and Mittelbau-Dora concentration camp before being transferred to Bergen-Belsen, from where he was liberated on 11 April 1945. He was appointed to be one of member rabbis of the bais din in Bergen-Belsen and together with the other rabbis was instrumental in permitting numerous agunot to remarry.

=== Chief Rabbi of Celle ===
In late 1945, Rabbi Olewski was appointed by the British Chief Rabbi's Religious Council to be the Chief Rabbi of Celle which was located in the British Zone of Germany, working closely with Michael Munk, the first post-WWII Rabbi of Berlin. Throughout the latter half of 1945, he and Munk administered and organised for the Jewish community in displaced persons camps in northern Germany, mostly in what is now Lower Saxony, including Lüneburg, Lübeck, Uelzen, Braunschweig, Hanover, Hallendorf, and Diepholz.

In 1949, the British occupation of North-West Germany ended and the British Chief Rabbi's Religious Emergency Council and its appointees were required to wrap up their operations in Germany. However, the local Jewish community asked Rabbi Olewski to continue as their Rabbi and Rabbi Olewski remained in his position. Ultimately in October 1950, he decided to emigrate to the United States.

Rabbi Olewski was also appointed to be one of the member Rabbis of the Vaad Harabonim of The British Zone, which was established and led by Rabbi Yoel Halpern.

=== Leader of Agudas Yisroel of the British Zone ===
Rabbi Olewski, together with Rabbi Shlomo Zev Zweigenhaft and Efraim Londoner were the leaders of Agudas Yisroel of the British Zone. Rabbi Olewski very much engaged in advocating for both the spiritual and physical needs to the Jews in the zone. In his efforts, Rabbi Olewski encouraged couples to marry, and even married off Holocaust survivors in displacement camps, encouraging them to forge a path to future Jewish generations.

== In the United States ==
After emigrating to the United States, Rabbi Olewski was appointed to be the principal of the Bostoner yeshiva. Later, Rabbi Olewski was appointed as Rabbi of one of the Gerrer synagogues in Brooklyn and was the founder of the Gerrer Yeshiva in the United States.

== Death ==
Rabbi Olewski died from cancer in New York City on 26 May 1966 and was buried in Jerusalem, Israel.
