= Konary, Radziejów County =

Konary
- Village
- Location within Poland
- Coordinates: 52°37′51″N 18°48′24″E
- Country: Poland
- Voivodeship: Kuyavian-Pomeranian
- County: Radziejów
- Gmina: Osięciny

Konary [kɔˈnarɨ] is a village in the administrative district of Gmina Osięciny, within Radziejów County, Kuyavian-Pomeranian Voivodeship, in north-central Poland.
