= Bytoń =

- Village
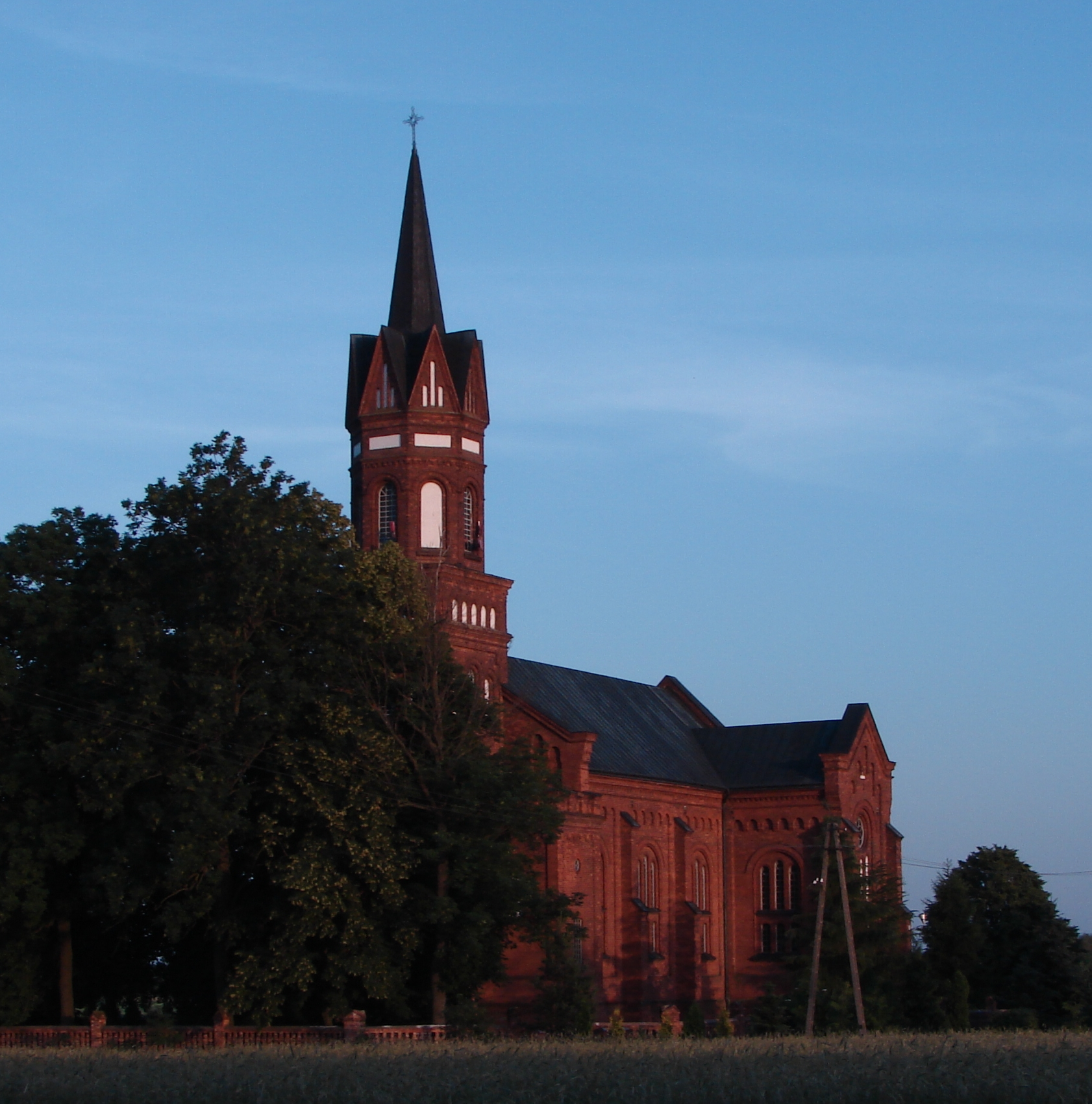
- Parish church of St. Stanislaus, completed 1908.

- Location within Poland
- Coordinates: 52°34′N 18°36′E
- Country: Poland
- Voivodeship: Kuyavian-Pomeranian
- County: Radziejów
- Gmina: Bytoń

Bytoń [ˈbɨtɔɲ] is a village in Radziejów County, Kuyavian-Pomeranian Voivodeship, in north-central Poland. It is the seat of the gmina (administrative district) called Gmina Bytoń.
