= Jakub Szczawiński =

Jakub Szczawiński (1577–1637) was a noble (szlachcic) in the Polish–Lithuanian Commonwealth, of Prawdzic Coat of Arms. He held the offices of voivode of Brześć Kujawski (1622–1637) and starosta łeczycki (1620–1637). He was also the Marshal of the Sejm in 1616 (26 April to 7 June).

He grew up in Borysławice and married Anna Karnkowska.

Note that since that Jakub Szaczawiński died in 1637, he is not the Jakub Szczawiński, also voivode of Brześć Kujawski, who became famous 15 years later for vocally criticizing Władysław Siciński (Bodaj przepadł), the petty noble who was the first to use the infamous liberum veto during the Sejm of 1652.
