= Bilno, Radziejów County =

Bilno
- Village
- Location within Poland
- Coordinates: 52°41′37″N 18°40′47″E
- Country: Poland
- Voivodeship: Kuyavian-Pomeranian
- County: Radziejów
- Gmina: Osięciny

Bilno [ˈbilnɔ] is a village in the administrative district of Gmina Osięciny, within Radziejów County, Kuyavian-Pomeranian Voivodeship, in north-central Poland.
