= Bodzanówek, Radziejów County =

Bodzanówek
- Village
- Location within Poland
- Coordinates: 52°40′22″N 18°40′53″E
- Country: Poland
- Voivodeship: Kuyavian-Pomeranian
- County: Radziejów
- Gmina: Osięciny

Bodzanówek [bɔd͡zaˈnuvɛk] is a village in the administrative district of Gmina Osięciny, within Radziejów County, Kuyavian-Pomeranian Voivodeship, in north-central Poland.
