= Zgłowiączka, Kuyavian-Pomeranian Voivodeship =

Zgłowiączka
- Village
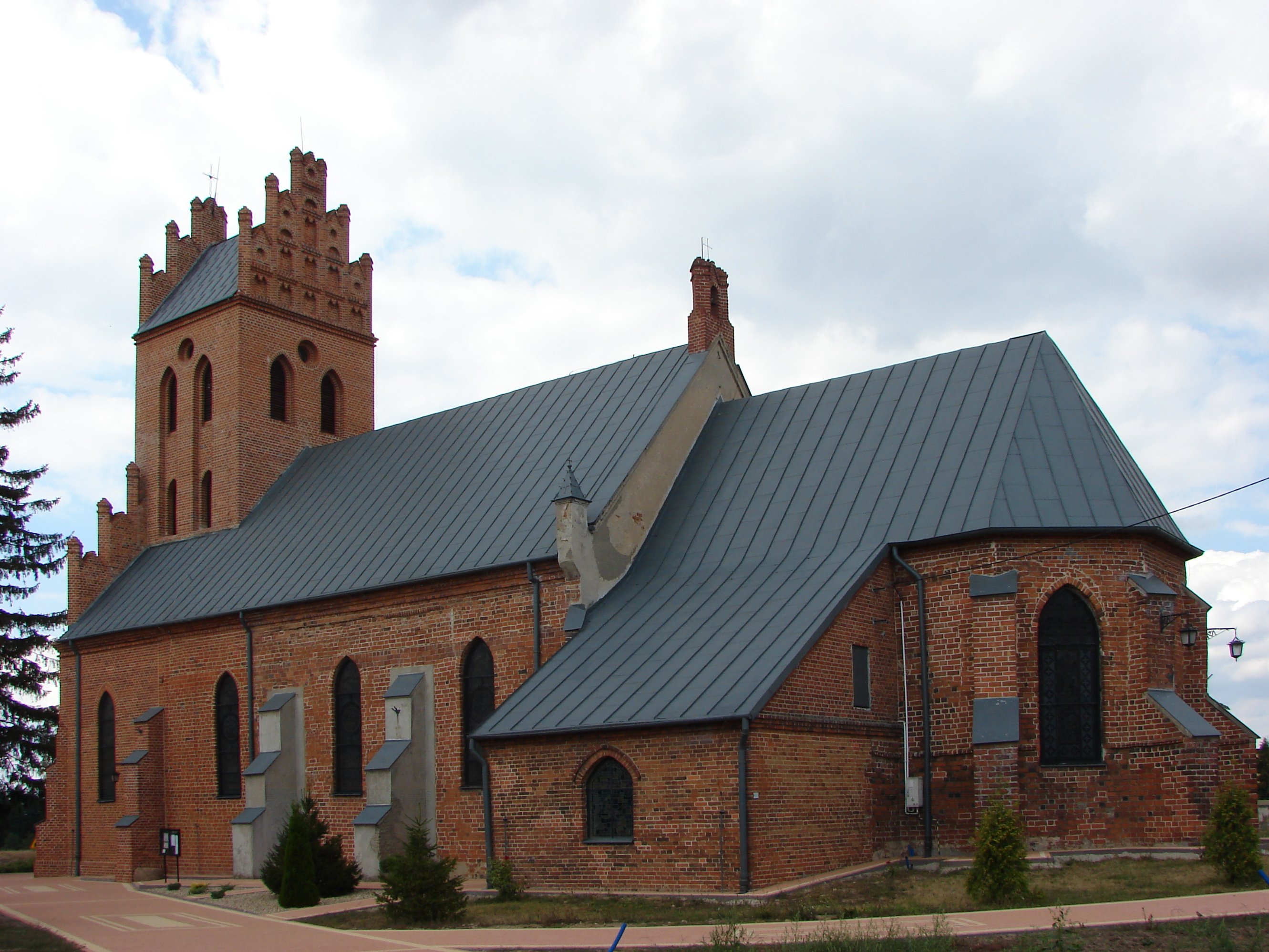
- Church of the Birth of the Blessed Virgin Mary, built before 1584.

- Location within Poland
- Coordinates: 52°30′38″N 18°47′12″E
- Country: Poland
- Voivodeship: Kuyavian-Pomeranian
- County: Włocławek
- Gmina: Lubraniec
- Population: 140
- Time zone: UTC+1 (CET)
  - Summer (DST): UTC+2 (CEST)
- Vehicle registration: CWL

Zgłowiączka [zɡwɔˈvjɔnt͡ʂka] is a village in the administrative district of Gmina Lubraniec, within Włocławek County, Kuyavian-Pomeranian Voivodeship, in central Poland.
