= Piotrków Kujawski =

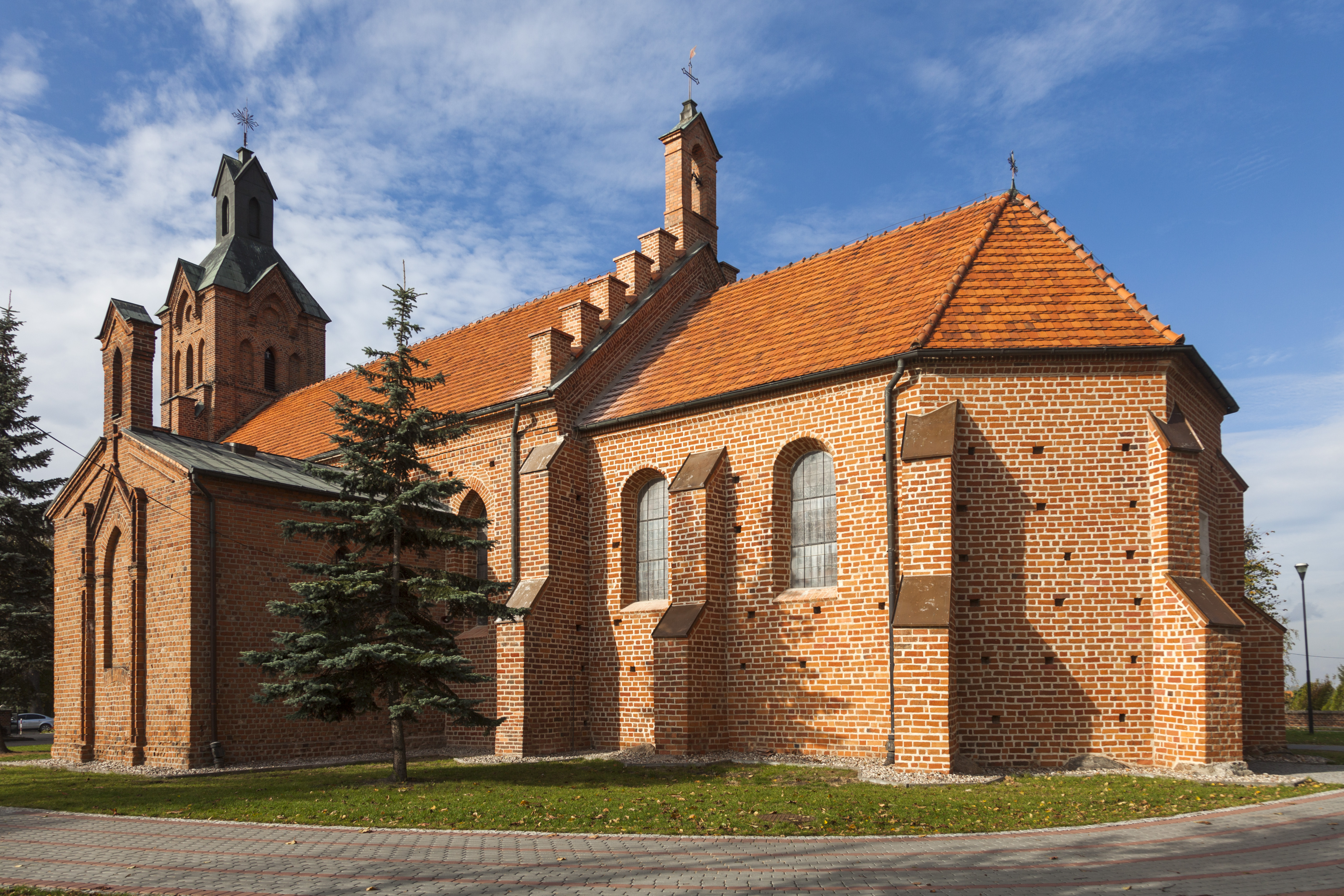
- Gothic Saint James church in Piotrków Kujawski

- Flag Coat of arms

- Location within Poland
- Coordinates: 52°32′49″N 18°30′3″E
- Country: Poland
- Voivodeship: Kuyavian-Pomeranian
- County: Radziejów
- Gmina: Piotrków Kujawski
- First mentioned: 1252
- Town rights: 1589

Area
  - Total: 9.76 km^{2} (3.77 sq mi)

Population (2006)
  - Total: 4,509
  - Density: 462/km^{2} (1,200/sq mi)
- Time zone: UTC+1 (CET)
  - Summer (DST): UTC+2 (CEST)
- Postal code: 88-230
- Vehicle registration: CRA
- Website: http://www.piotrkowkujawski.pl

Piotrków Kujawski [ˈpʲɔtrkuf kuˈjafskʲi] is a town in Radziejów County, Kuyavian-Pomeranian Voivodeship, Poland, with 4,463 inhabitants (2004).

== History ==
The oldest known mention of Piotrków dates back to 1252. It was granted town rights in 1589 by King Sigismund III of Poland.

After the joint German–Soviet invasion of Poland, which started World War II, Piotrków Kujawski was occupied by Germany from 1939 to 1945. It was one of the sites of executions of Poles, carried out by the Germans as part of the Intelligenzaktion. In 1939, the Germans carried out a massacre of 22 Poles, including 8 Catholic priests, in the town. Under the German occupation, the Jews, whose pre-war population numbered between 800 and 900, were placed in a ghetto, stripped of their possessions, and forced to do unpaid labor. In 1941, a few were sent to labor camps. In April 1942, the remaining Jews were rounded up and sent in trucks to the Chełmno extermination camp where they were immediately murdered. Only fourteen of the prewar population are known to have survived.

== Transport ==
Piotrków Kujawski lies at the intersection of vovoideship roads 267 and 266.

The nearest railway station is in Inowrocław.

== Sports ==
The local football club is Zjednoczeni Piotrków Kujawski. It competes in the lower leagues.
