= Osięciny =

- Village
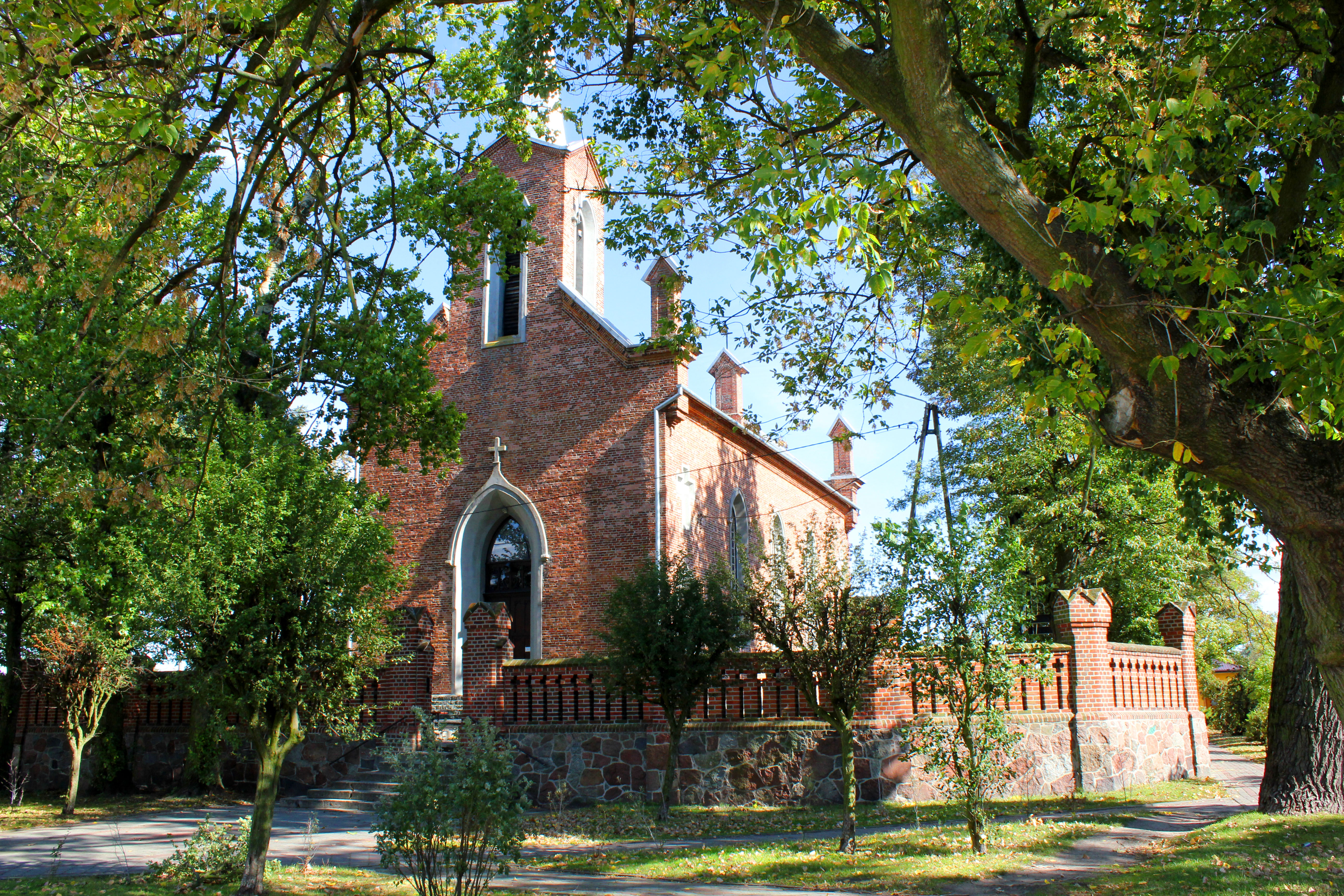
- Church of Our Lady

- Location within Poland
- Coordinates: 52°38′N 18°43′E
- Country: Poland
- Voivodeship: Kuyavian-Pomeranian
- County: Radziejów
- Gmina: Osięciny

Population
  - Total: 2,700
- Time zone: UTC+1 (CET)
  - Summer (DST): UTC+2 (CEST)

Osięciny [ɔɕɛnˈt͡ɕinɨ] (Yiddish: אשענטשין) is a village in Radziejów County, Kuyavian-Pomeranian Voivodeship, in central Poland. It is the seat of the gmina (administrative district) called Gmina Osięciny.

In 2006 the village had a population of 2,700.

== History ==
Osięciny was granted town rights in 1824, which were eventually revoked in 1870. It was located on a route connecting Włocławek and Radziejów.

After the First World War there were 450 Jews in the village. In Osięciny were Jewish social aid institutions and branches of the Zionist parties and Agudat Israel.

Following the German-Soviet invasion of Poland, which started World War II in September 1939, Osięciny was occupied by Germany until 1945. A Judenrat was established and its main role was to provide forced labourers. In 1940, the German gendarmerie carried out an expulsion of 50 Poles, who were either enslaved as forced labour of new German colonists in the area or sent to a transit camp in Łódź and then deported in freight trains to the Lublin region in the more-eastern part of occupied Poland. A ghetto was established in 1940 in the village. In April 1942, the Jews were gathered in the church and from there they were sent to Chełmno extermination camp.
