= Skibin, Słupsk County =

Skibin
- Village
- Location within Poland
- Coordinates: 54°30′20″N 17°20′16″E
- Country: Poland
- Voivodeship: Pomeranian
- County: Słupsk
- Gmina: Damnica
- Population: 34

Skibin [ˈskibin] (German: Franzhagen) is a village in the administrative district of Gmina Damnica, within Słupsk County, Pomeranian Voivodeship, in northern Poland.

For the history of the region, see History of Pomerania.
