= Brześć Kujawski Voivodeship =

Unit of administrative division in the Kingdom of Poland

Coordinates: 52°36′21″N 18°54′17″E

Brześć Kujawski Voivodeship Palatinatus Brestensis Województwo brzesko-kujawskie
- Voivodeship of Poland^{1}
- 14th century–1793
- Coat of arms

- Brześć Kujawski Voivodeship in the Polish–Lithuanian Commonwealth, 1635
- Capital: Brześć Kujawski
- Area
- 3,000 km^{2} (1,200 sq mi)
- History
  - Established: 14th century
  - Second Partition of Poland: 1793
- Political subdivisions: counties: 5
Preceded by	Succeeded by
Duchy of Brześć Kujawski / Duchy of Brześć Kujawski	West Prussia / West Prussia
- Today part of: Poland
- ¹ Voivodeship of the Polish Crown in the Polish–Lithuanian Commonwealth; Voivodeship of the Kingdom of Poland before 1569.

The Brześć Kujawski Voivodeship (Polish: Województwo brzesko-kujawskie, Latin: Palatinatus Brestensis) was a unit of administrative division and local government in the Kingdom of Poland (later Polish–Lithuanian Commonwealth), from the 14th century to the Second Partition of Poland in 1793. It was part of the historic Kuyavia region and the Greater Poland Province. Originally, its name was Brzesc Voivodeship (Województwo brzeskie), but after the 1569 Union of Lublin, it was renamed into Brześć Kujawski Voivodeship, to distinguish it from Lithuanian Brest Litovsk Voivodeship (Polish: Województwo brzesko-litewskie).

== Geography ==
Its area was 3,276 sq. kilometers, divided into five counties. The seat of the voivode was at Brześć Kujawski, while local sejmiks for both Brześć Kujawski and Inowrocław Voivodeships took place at Radziejów. It was one of the smallest and most densely populated voivodeships of the Commonwealth.

Zygmunt Gloger in his monumental book Historical Geography of the Lands of Old Poland provides this description of Brześć Kujawski Voivodeship:

East of the land of the Polans lies the region of Kujawy, most of which stretches along left bank of the Vistula. The region was divided into two voivodeships: those of Brześć Kujawski, and Inowrocław. Third part of historic Kujawy, the Dobrzyn Land, lies on the right bank of the Vistula. Duke Boleslaw Krzywousty, while writing his testament in 1138, united Kujawy and Mazovia, giving it to his son Boleslaw IV the Curly (...) The dynasty of Mazovian Piasts lasted until the 16th century, while the Kujawian Piasts died out in the 14th century. As a result, Kujawy returned to the Crown of the Kingdom of Poland in 1434, two hundred years before Mazovia. It is not known when the province was divided into two voivodeships, but in Horodlo in 1413 (see Union of Horodlo), two Kujawian voivodes were already present: Maciej of Labiszyn was the voivode of Brześć, and Janusz of Koscieliska was the voivode of Gniewkowo, later Inowrocław (...)

The area of Brześć Kujawski Voivodeship was almost 60 sq. miles, with 67 Roman-Catholic parishes, 13 towns and 567 villages. It was divided into five counties: Brześć Kujawski, Radziejow, Przedecz, Kowal and Kruszwica. All counties were among the smallest in the Province of Greater Poland, as Przedecz County had the area of 9 sq. miles, while Kruszwica County was even smaller, with 6 sq. miles. At the same time, however, Brześć Kujawski Voivodeship (together with Łęczyca Voivodeship) was most densely populated of all voivodeships of the Polish–Lithuanian Commonwealth. Its population density in the 16th century reached 1,200, even 1,300 people per sq. mile (...)

Brześć Kujawski Voivodeship had six senators. These were: The Bishop of Kujawy, the Voivode and the Castellan of Brześć Kujawski, as well as Castellans of Kruszwica, Kowal and Konary. Starostas resided in capitals of the five counties, plus at Nieszawa and Dunikow. Since both Brześć Kujawski and Inowrocław voivodeships were part of Kujawy, local sejmiks for them took place at Radziejow. Here, four deputies to the Sejm were elected, and two deputies to the Greater Poland Tribunal. Both voivodeships shared one coat of arms.

== Administration ==
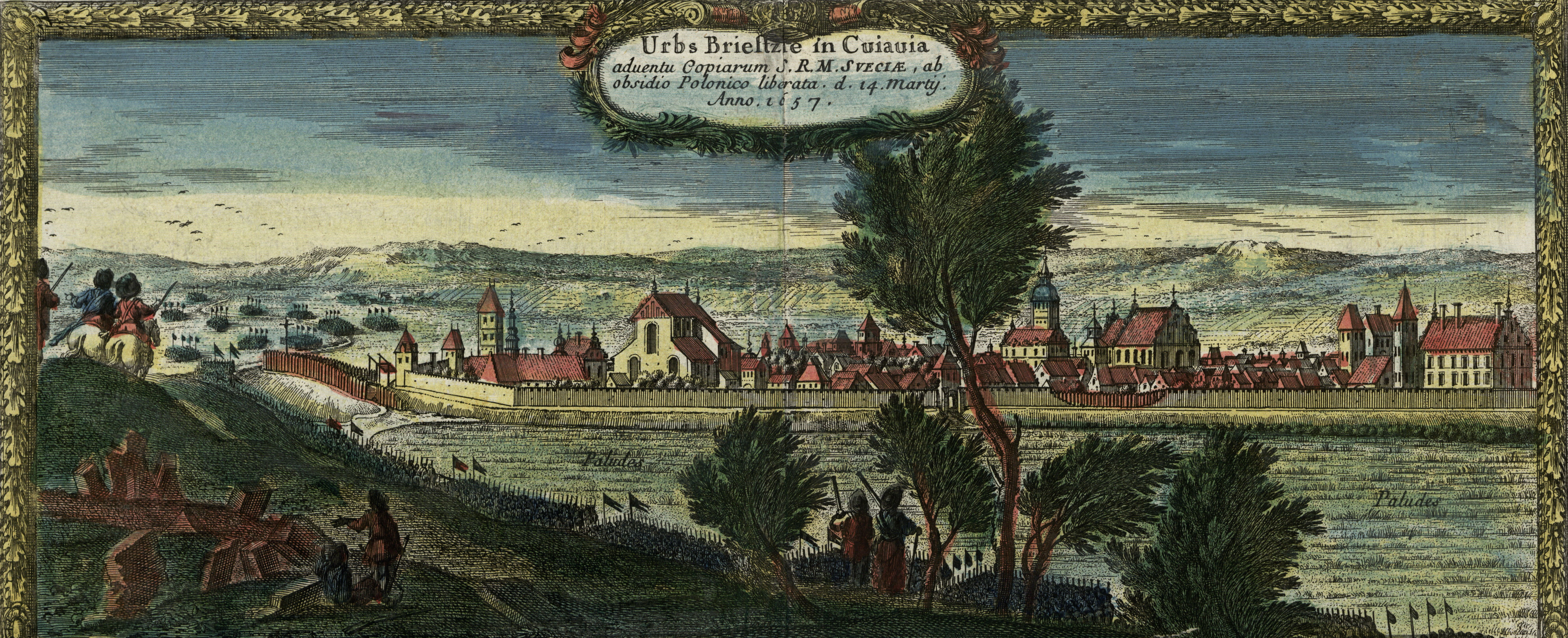
Brześć Kujawski, capital of the voivodeship, in the 17th century

Governor seat:

- Brześć Kujawski

Regional council (sejmik) seats:

- Radziejów

Counties

- Brześć Kujawski County,
- Kowal County,
- Kruszwica County,
- Przedecz County,
- Radziejów County.

Neighbouring Voivodeships:

- Inowrocław Voivodeship
- Rawa Voivodeship
- Łęczyca Voivodeship
- Kalisz Voivodeship
- Gniezno Voivodeship (since 1768)

== Cities and towns ==
=== Brześć Kujawski County ===
- Brześć Kujawski
- Lubraniec
- Nieszawa
- Włocławek

=== Kowal County ===
- Kowal
- Lubień

=== Kruszwica County ===
- Gębice
- Kruszwica
- Skulsk
- Strzelno

=== Przedecz County ===
- Brdów
- Chodecz
- Izbica
- Przedecz

=== Radziejów County ===
- Noć
- Piotrków
- Radziejów
- Sompolno

== Voivodes ==
- Arnold (1228)
- Krzesław (1231–1233)
- Bronisz ze Służewa (1294–1305)
- Stanisław z Kruszyna (died 1308/13)
- Mikuł (died 1317/19)
- Jan z Płonkowa (1328–1343)
- Wojciech z Pakości (1325 – c. 1345)
- Wojciech z Kościelca (1358–1386)
- Krzesław z Kościoła (1391–1412)
- Maciej z Łabiszyna (1412–1430)
- Jan z Lichenia (1430–1448)
- Jan Kretkowski (1449–1452)
- Mikołaj Szarlejski ze Ściborza (1453–1457)
- Mikołaj Kościelecki (1457–1479)
- Andrzej Kretkowski (1480)
- Piotr Donin (1480–1484)
- Jan z Oporowa (1484–1494)
- Maciej ze Służewa (1494–1496)
- Andrzej z Pierowej Woli i Lubienia (1496–1498)
- Mikołaj Kościelecki (1500–1510)
- Stanisław Kościelecki (1520–1522)
- Mikołaj Kościelecki (1523–1525)
- Jan Janusz Kościelecki (1540–1542)
- Rafał Leszczyński (1545–1550)
- Jan Janusz II Kościelecki (1550–1552)
- Łukasz III Górka (1554–1563)
- Jan Służewski (1563–1580)
- Piotr Potulicki (1580–1582)
- Grzegorz Kretkowski (1582–1590)
- Andrzej Leszczyński (1591–1606)
- Michał Działyński (1609–1617)
- Jan Gostomski (1620)
- Jakub Szczawiński (1620–1637)
- Andrzej Kretkowski (1637–1643)
- Jan Szymon Szczawiński (1643–1655)
- Władysław Wierzbowski (1656–1657)
- Hieronim Wierzbowski (1657–1661)
- Zygmunt Działyński (1661–1678)
- Jan Opaliński (1678–1684)
- Zygmunt Dąmbski (1684–1704)
- Maciej Pstrokoński (1706–1707)
- Jan Jakub Potulicki (1707–1726)
- Andrzej Dąmbski (1726–1734)
- Antoni Dąmbski (1734–1771)
- Ludwik Karol Dąmbski (1771–1783)
- Stanisław Dąmbski (1783–1795)

== Sources ==
- Brzesc Kujawski Voivodeship, description by Zygmunt Gloger
