= Radziejów =

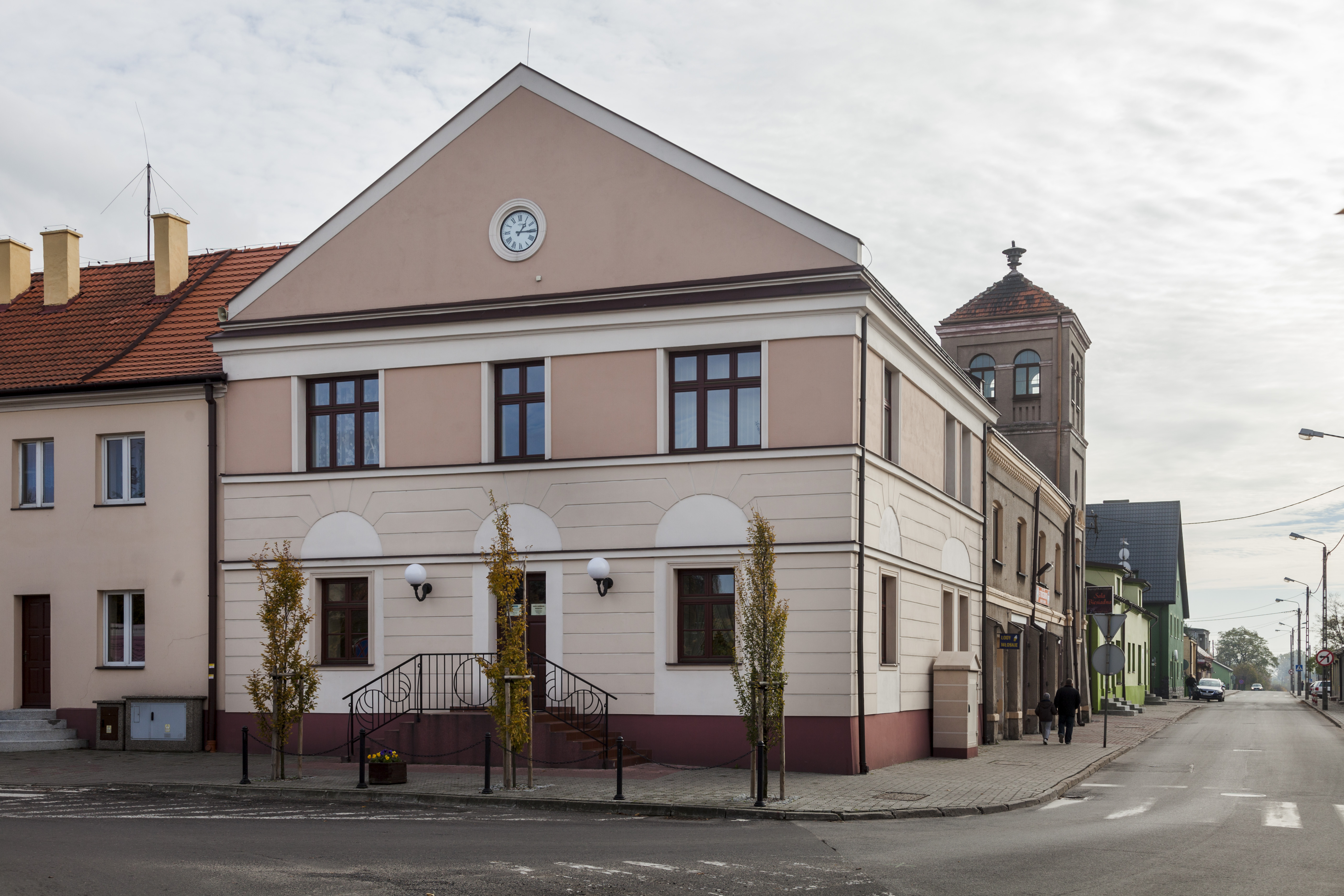
- Town hall

- Flag Coat of arms

- Location within Poland
- Coordinates: 52°38′N 18°31′E
- Country: Poland
- Voivodeship: Kuyavian-Pomeranian
- County: Radziejów
- Gmina: Radziejów (urban gmina)
- First mentioned: 1142
- Town rights: 1252

Government
  - Mayor: Sławomir Bartłomiej Bykowski

Area
  - Total: 5.69 km^{2} (2.20 sq mi)
- Elevation: 124 m (407 ft)

Population (2024)
  - Total: 5,006
  - Density: 880/km^{2} (2,280/sq mi)
- Time zone: UTC+1 (CET)
  - Summer (DST): UTC+2 (CEST)
- Postal code: 88-200
- Area code: +48 54
- Car plates: CRA
- Climate: Dfb
- Website: http://www.umradziejow.pl/

Radziejów (Polish pronunciation: [raˈd͡ʑɛjuf]) is a town in Poland, in Kuyavian-Pomeranian Voivodeship, about 45 km (28 mi) south of Toruń. It is the capital of Radziejów County. Located in the historic region of Kuyavia, in 1331 the Battle of Płowce took place near the town. Its population is 5,006 (2024).

== History ==
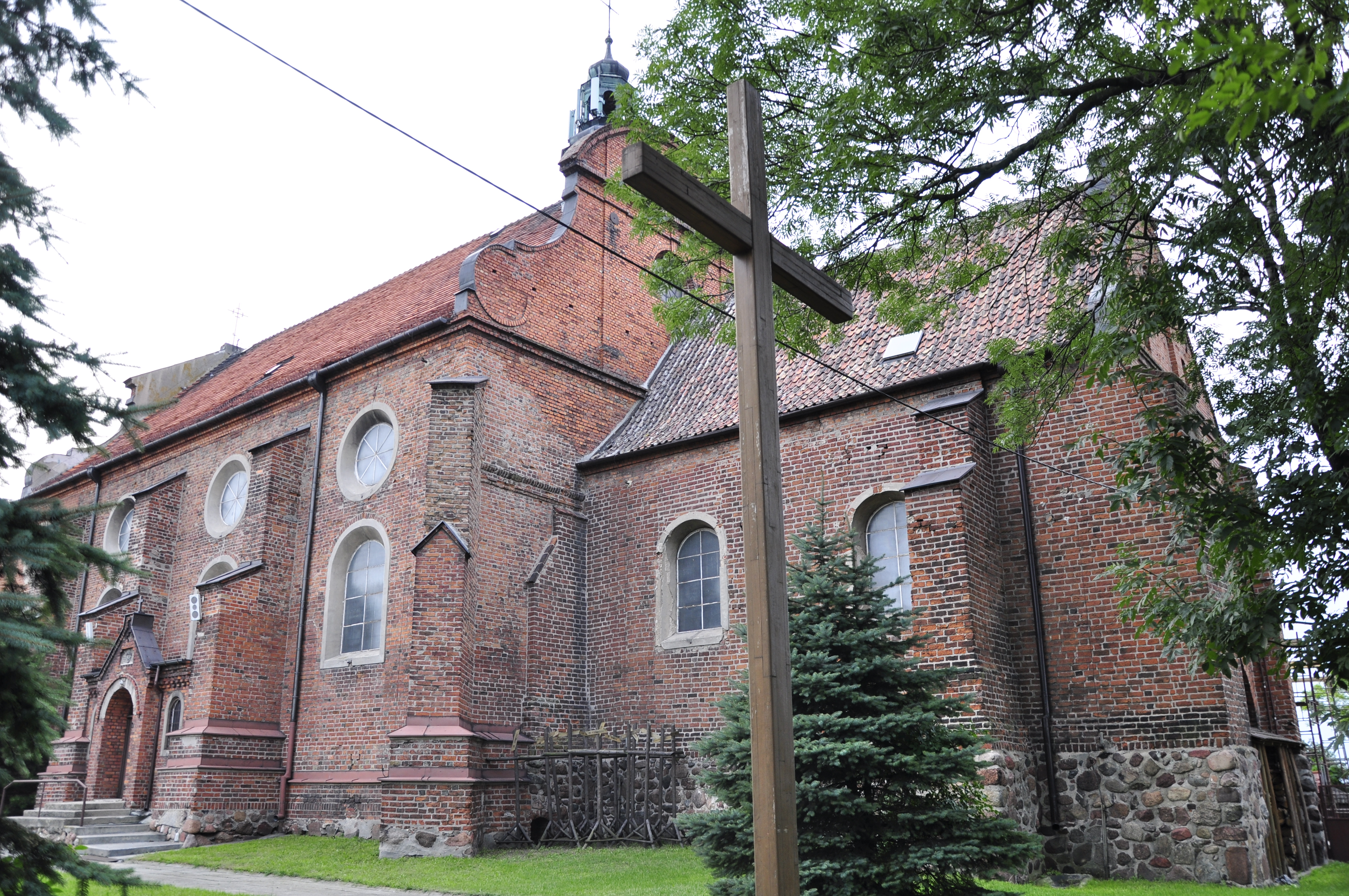
Gothic Church of the Feast of the Cross, founded by King Władysław I Łokietek

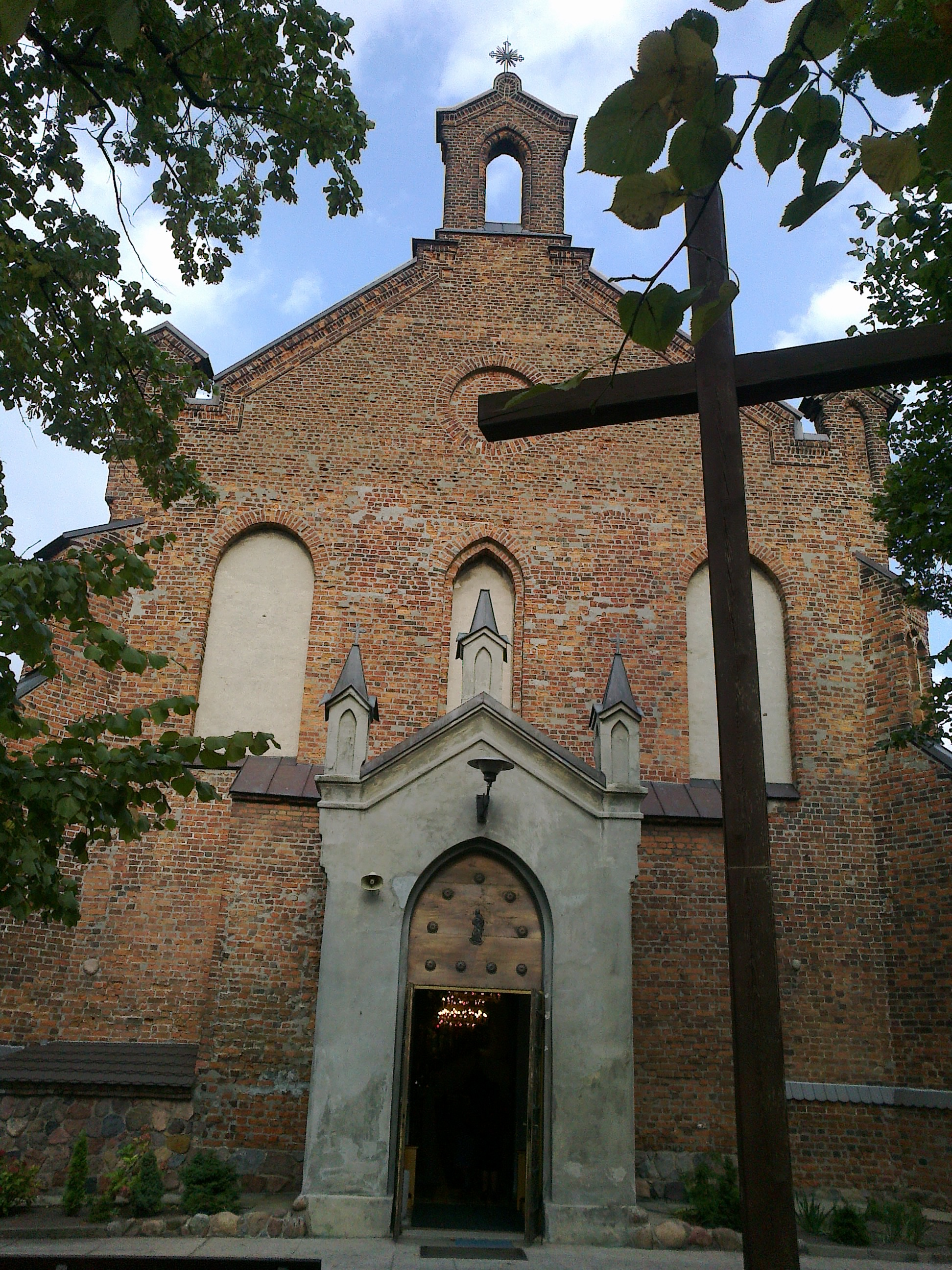
Gothic Church of the Assumption of Mary

The earliest known mention of Radziejów is found in a document from 1142 under the name of Radeow, which states that it was given by the High Duchess consort of Poland Salomea of Berg to the monastery in Mogilno. Later it passed to the Diocese of Płock. In the second half of the 13th century it grew into a significant center of local administration. It was granted town rights in 1252 by Duke Casimir I of Kuyavia, confirmed in 1298 by future Polish King Władysław I Łokietek, who granted it Magdeburg Law. Kings Władysław I Łokietek and Władysław II Jagiełło vested it with new trade privileges and Sigismund I the Old established a weekly fair. Władysław I Łokietek founded the Franciscan monastery with the Gothic Church of the Feast of the Cross, one of the landmarks of the town.

It was a royal town and county seat, located in the Brześć Kujawski Voivodeship in the Greater Poland Province. The sejmiks for entire Kuyavia were held in Radziejów. The local royal castle was demolished by the Swedes in 1702, during the Great Northern War. In 1720 the first Piarist college of Poland was founded in Radziejów. It was moved to Włocławek in 1819.

In 1793 the town found itself in Prussia following the Second Partition of Poland. In 1807 it passed to the short lived Polish Duchy of Warsaw, and then in 1815 it became a part of the Congress Poland in the Russian Empire. In the course of the 19th century the town declined. As part of Russian reprisals after the failed Polish January Uprising, the Franciscan monastery was closed down in 1864, and in 1867 Radziejów lost its city charter. In 1918 it became a part of reconstituted, independent Poland, was again granted city rights in 1919 and developed again afterwards.

The town had a Jewish community since the 18th century, with 15 Jews (5% of the population) recorded in 1793. Restrictions on Jewish settlement were in force from 1822 to 1862. According to the 1921 census the town had a Jewish community consisting of 599 people, or 19.0 percent of its total population.

In 1933 Radziejów obtained a railway connection as the newly built Polish Coal Trunk-Line passed just 3 km (2 mi) west of the town. Though no dedicated Radziejów station was built, the inhabitants of the town could board trains in nearby Chełmce.

During World War II, the German army entered the town on 9 September 1939. During the German occupation, the town was part of Reichsgau Wartheland, a portion of Poland directly annexed by Germany. In 1940 hundreds of Poles were expelled, and their houses, shops and workshops were handed over to German colonists as part of the Lebensraum policy. Local catechist, priest Jan Wieczorek was among Polish teachers murdered by the Germans in the Dachau concentration camp during the Intelligenzaktion. In 1943 the Germans renamed the town to Rädichau.

In the course of the Holocaust, the town's Jewish population was confined in a ghetto which existed from 1941 until 1942, with about 800 inmates. The ghetto was liquidated in 1942 when its population was transported to Chelmno extermination camp in April 1942 where they were killed in gas vans by carbon monoxide exhaust. The town was liberated from the Nazis by the Soviet army on 20 January 1945.

After the war, some Jewish survivors returned to Radziejów in the summer of 1945, where they found their houses and businesses taken over by Poles. After the murder on the night of 29/30 September 1945 of two Jews in nearby village Osięciny, Radziejów's Jews fled the town, but returned a few weeks later. In 1946 they organized a local branch of the Central Committee of Polish Jews (Centralny Komitet Żydów Polskich), which functioned until 1948 by which time most of its members left Radziejów. After 1949 no organised Jewish community existed and only a few individual Jews remained in the town during the subsequent decades.

Historical population
Year	Pop.	±%
1921	3,164	—
1931	4,025	+27.2%
2010	5,696	+41.5%

In 1979 a new hospital opened in Radziejów designed to accommodate 272 patient beds (today functioning as Samodzielny Publiczny Zakład Opieki Zdrowotnej w Radziejowie).

In 2018, "The Nazi, the Princess, and the Shoemaker" was published, describing the relationship of Poles and Jews in Radziejow prior to World War II as well as the Nazi occupation of the town and what happened to its Jewish population.

== Transport ==
National road 62 bypasses Radziejów to the north.

Vovoideship road 266 passes through the town.

The nearest railway station is in Włocławek.

== Sports ==
The local football club is Start Radziejów. It competes in the lower leagues.

== Notable people ==
- Yisroel Moshe Olewski

== See also ==
- Głuszyńskie Lake
