= Radziejów County =

Radziejów County Powiat radziejowski
- County
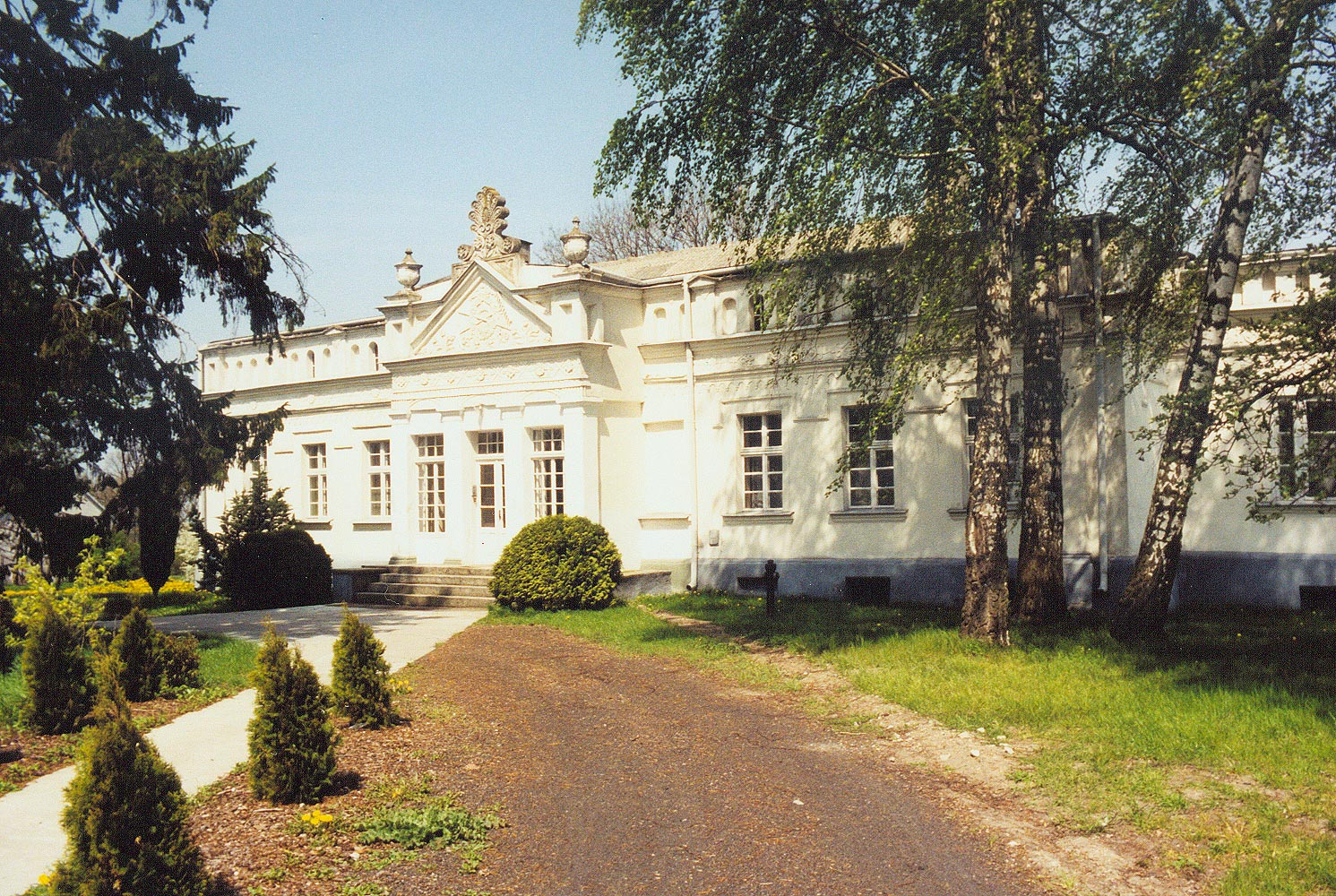

- Flag Coat of arms

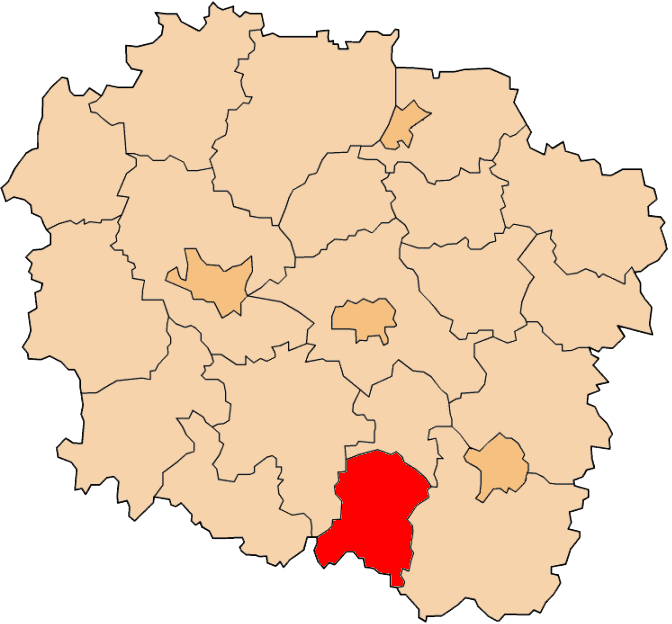
- Location within the voivodeship
- Coordinates (Radziejów): 52°38′N 18°31′E
- Country: Poland
- Voivodeship: Kuyavian-Pomeranian
- Seat: Radziejów
- Gminas: Total 7 (incl. 1 urban): Radziejów; Gmina Bytoń; Gmina Dobre; Gmina Osięciny; Gmina Piotrków Kujawski; Gmina Radziejów; Gmina Topólka

Area
  - Total: 607 km^{2} (234 sq mi)

Population (2019)
  - Total: 40,546
  - Density: 66.8/km^{2} (173/sq mi)
  - Urban: 10,034
  - Rural: 30,512
- Time zone: UTC+1 (CET)
  - Summer (DST): UTC+2 (CEST)
- Car plates: CRA
- Website: www.radziejow.pl

Radziejów County (Polish: powiat radziejowski) is a unit of territorial administration and local government (powiat) in Kuyavian-Pomeranian Voivodeship, central Poland. It came into being on January 1, 1999, as a result of the Polish local government reforms passed in 1998. Its administrative seat and largest town is Radziejów, which lies 45 km (28 mi) south of Toruń and 64 km (40 mi) south-east of Bydgoszcz. The only other town in the county is Piotrków Kujawski, lying 10 km (6 mi) south of Radziejów.

The county covers an area of 607 square kilometres (234.4 sq mi). As of 2019 its total population is 40,546, out of which the population of Radziejów is 5,578, that of Piotrków Kujawski is 4,456, and the rural population is 30,512.

== Neighbouring counties ==
Radziejów County is bordered by Aleksandrów County to the north, Włocławek County to the east, Koło County and Konin County to the south, and Inowrocław County to the north-west.

== Administrative divisions ==
The county is subdivided into seven gminas (one urban, one urban-rural and five rural). These are listed in the following table, in descending order of population.

Gmina	Type	Area (km^{2})	Population (2019)	Seat
Gmina Piotrków Kujawski	urban-rural	138.6	9,311	Piotrków Kujawski
Gmina Osięciny	rural	123.0	7,619	Osięciny
Radziejów	urban	5.7	5,578	
Gmina Dobre	rural	70.8	5,372	Dobre
Gmina Topólka	rural	102.9	4,827	Topólka
Gmina Radziejów	rural	92.6	4,366	Radziejów *
Gmina Bytoń	rural	73.4	3,473	Bytoń
* seat not part of the gmina
