= Battle of Nowa Wieś =

Battle of Nowa Wieś may also refer to:

- Battle of Nowa Wieś (1831)
- First Battle of Nowa Wieś (1863)
- Second Battle of Nowa Wieś (1863)
