= Warsaw Dictator Executive Commission =

The Warsaw Dictator Executive Commission (Polish: Komisja Wykonawcza Dyktatora w Warszawie) was the short-lived supreme authority of the Polish rebel state during the January Uprising, that administrated the territories remaining under the control of the enemy forces. It existed from 12 March to 21 March 1863, temporarily replacing the Provisional National Government. It functioned alongside the National Civil Government, both de jure under the rule of dictator Marian Langiewicz. Its seat was located in the city of Warsaw.

== History ==
In 1863, started the January Uprising, the conflict fought in the Congress Poland, between Russian Empire, and the rebel forces fighting to reestablish the Polish–Lithuanian Commonwealth. On 22 January 1863, the rebels had formed the Provisional National Government, which on 30 January, had nominated Ludwik Mierosławski to become the dictator of the rebellion, while he at the time resided in Paris. He arrived in Poland on 17 February, however, due to his military defeat in the battles of Krzywosądz and Nowa Wieś, he retreated from the country, retiring to Paris. In such development, the Provisional National Government ordered him to return to the fight by 8 March, which did not happen.

On 12 March, the Whites faction, used the situation to their advantage, by convincing Marian Langiewicz, to become the new dictator. They have done that, by having their people pretend to him, to be the representatives of the Polish National Government. As such, Langiewicz had established the new governing body, the National Civil Government. Following that, the members of the Provisional National Government, had recognized the new government of Langiewicz, with him disestablishing the prior government and all its branches. However, the members of the previous government, had made an agreement, that, with the authorization of the dictator, the area of the country under the control of the enemy forces, will be governed by the Dictator Executive Commission in Warsaw instead.

On 19 March, Langiewicz, crossed the Polish border to Kingdom of Galicia and Lodomeria, where he got arrested. As such, on 21 March, Stefan Bobrowski, the former chairperson of the Provisional National Government, had announced in Kraków, the disestablishment of the National Civil Government, with its replacement by the reestablished previous government. It included the formation of the coalition government, consisting of the representatives of the factions of Whites and Reds.

== Members ==
The commission consisted of the four members. They were:

- Oskar Awejde;
- Jan Majkowski;
- Leon Królikowski;
- Karol Ruprecht.
