= Provisional government =

Emergency governmental authority

A provisional government, also called an interim, emergency, or transitional government, is a temporary government formed to manage a period of transition, often following state collapse, revolution, civil war, or some combination thereof.

Provisional governments generally come to power in connection with the sudden, catastrophic and irreversible collapse of the previous political system, resulting from revolution, coup d'état, civil war, debellatio, economic collapse, the death of a strongman ruler, or other circumstances which have resulted in state collapse. Questions of democratic transition and state-building are often fundamental to the formation and policies of such governments.

Provisional governments maintain power until a permanent government can be appointed by a regular political process, which is generally an election. They are usually heavily involved with the process of defining the legal and constitutional basis of their permanent successors (or at least the constituent assembly entrusted to draw up a such an arrangement), including institutional structure, human rights regimes, macroeconomic structure, and foreign relations.

Provisional governments differ from caretaker governments, which are responsible for governing within an established parliamentary system and serve temporarily after an election, vote of no confidence or cabinet crisis, until a new government can be appointed. Caretaker governments operate entirely within the existing constitutional framework and most countries tightly circumscribe their authority, either by convention or more formal legal means. Conversely, provisional governments, which typically arise from catastrophic institutional collapse, often have the ability to rule by decree in the absence of a functional legislature (at least until a constituent assembly or other transitional legislative assembly can be convened) and, of necessity given their role in crisis response, exercise broad powers with few restrictions (often without even a national constitution).

In opinion of Yossi Shain and Juan J. Linz, provisional governments can be classified to four groups:

1. Revolutionary provisional governments (when the former regime is overthrown and the power belongs to the people who have overthrown it).
2. Power sharing provisional governments (when the power is shared between former regime and the ones who are trying to change it).
3. Incumbent provisional governments (when the power during transitional period belongs to the former regime).
4. International provisional governments (when the power during the transitional period belongs to the international community).

The establishment of provisional governments is frequently tied to the implementation of transitional justice. Provisional governments may be responsible for implementing transitional justice measures as part of the path to establishing a permanent government structure.

The early provisional governments were created to prepare for the return of royal rule. Irregularly convened assemblies during the English Revolution, such as Confederate Ireland (1641–49), were described as "provisional". The Continental Congress, a convention of delegates from 13 British colonies on the east coast of North America, became the provisional government of the United States in 1776, during the American Revolutionary War. The government shed its provisional status in 1781, following ratification of the Articles of Confederation, and continued in existence as the Congress of the Confederation until it was supplanted by the United States Congress in 1789.

The practice of using "provisional government" as part of a formal name can be traced to Talleyrand's government in France in 1814. In 1843, American pioneers in the Oregon Country, in the Pacific Northwest region of North America established the Provisional Government of Oregon—as the U.S. federal government had not yet extended its jurisdiction over the region—which existed until March 1849. The numerous provisional governments during the Revolutions of 1848 gave the word its modern meaning: a temporary central government appointed following the overthrow or collapse of the previous regime, with a mandate to prepare for national elections.

== Africa ==
=== 20th century ===
- Provisional Government of the Algerian Republic (1958–1962) (guerrilla movement)
- The Derg (1974–1987), formed during the Ethiopian Civil War following the overthrow of emperor Haile Selassie. Ultimately absorbed into the People's Democratic Republic of Ethiopia.
- Zimbabwe Rhodesia (1979–1980), a short-lived yet internationally unrecognized sovereign state formed in the waning years of the Rhodesian Bush War, in contrast with the reestablished Southern Rhodesia. Ultimately dissolved in favor of granting independence to Southern Rhodesia as Zimbabwe.
- Southern Rhodesia (1979–1980), a provisional reestablishment of the British colony in contrast with the internationally unrecognized Zimbabwe Rhodesia. The brief return to colonial rule served to provide British supervision over the end of the Rhodesian Bush War and Rhodesia's transition to majority rule as an independent Zimbabwe.
- Transitional Military Council (1985–1986), interim government of Sudan following the 1985 Sudanese coup d'état, dissolved following the 1986 Sudanese parliamentary election.
- Transitional Government of National Unity (Namibia) (1985–1989), interim government during the end of the South African Border War
- Political Bureau of the Central Committee of FRELIMO (1986), interim ruling body of the People's Republic of Mozambique following the death of president Samora Machel in the 1986 Mozambican Tupolev Tu-134 crash. Dissolved following the election of Joaquim Chissano as Machel's successor later that year.
- Transitional Government of Ethiopia (1991–1995), established upon the Ethiopian People's Revolutionary Democratic Front's overthrow of the People's Democratic Republic of Ethiopia at the end of the Ethiopian Civil War. Succeeded by the Federal Democratic Republic of Ethiopia.
- Interim Government of Somalia (1991–1997), established after the collapse of the Somali Democratic Republic and the onset of the Somali Civil War.
- Provisional Government of Eritrea (1993), established after independence from Ethiopia
- Armed Forces Provisional Ruling Council (1994–1996), interim ruling body of the Gambia following the 1994 Gambian coup d'état. Dissolved after Yahya Jammeh, the head of the ruling council, was elected and inaugurated as president.

=== 21st century ===
As of 2026, nine African countries currently have provisional governments: Burkina Faso, Guinea, Guinea-Bissau, Libya, Madagascar, Mali, Niger, South Sudan, and Sudan.

- Transitional National Government of Somalia (2000–2004), established at the Somalia National Peace Conference in opposition to the Somalia Reconciliation and Restoration Council, formed by rival political factions. Succeeded by the Transitional Federal Government of Somalia.
- Transitional Government of the Democratic Republic of the Congo (2003–2006), established in 2003 following the conclusion of the Second Congo War.
- National Transitional Legislative Assembly of Liberia (2003–2006), Liberia's legislative body during the country's transition from civil war to democratic rule.
- Transitional Federal Government of Somalia (2004–2012), established as the successor to the Transitional National Government of Somalia as part of an effort to end the Islamic Courts Union's rule over the nation. Dissolved following the ratification of a new constitution which declared Somalia an Islamic state.
- Darfur Regional Government (2007–present), established in the Darfur region of Sudan following the 2006 Abuja Agreement during the War in Darfur.
- High Transitional Authority (2009–2014), established following Marc Ravalomanana's overthrow and the end of the Third Republic of Madagascar during the 2009 Malagasy political crisis. Dissolved following the 2013 Malagasy general election, which established the Fourth Republic of Madagascar.

==== 2010s ====
- Kabyle Provisional Government (2010–present), formed as a provisional government-in-exile, in opposition to the incumbent government of Algeria, with the intent of establishing an independent nation in Kabylia.
- National Transitional Council of Libya (2011–2012), formed during the 2011 civil war in Libya against the Gaddafi-led government
- Government of National Accord (2015–2021), interim ruling body of Libya formed upon the signing of the Skhirat agreement. Ultimately merged with the rival Second Al-Thani Cabinet to form the Government of National Unity following the Libyan Political Dialogue Forum.
- Interim Government of Ambazonia (2017–de facto 2019), formed as a provisional government-in-exile in opposition to the government of Cameroon shortly after the onset of the Anglophone Crisis. Later splintered into four opposing cabinets in 2019, each claiming to be the sole legitimate representative of an independent Ambazonia.

==== 2020s ====
- The UN-supported Government of National Unity in Libya (2021–present), a merger of the Government of National Accord and the rival Second Al-Thani Cabinet formed following the Libyan Political Dialogue Forum in Sirte.
- Transitional Sovereignty Council (2019–2021, 2021–present), established in August 2019 after 8 month-long protests against President Bashir and a subsequent military coup.
- Revitalized Transitional Government of National Unity (2020–present), transitional government formed in 2020
- Transitional government of Mali (2021–present), formed following the dissolution of the National Committee for the Salvation of the People by president Bah Ndaw.
- Transitional Military Council (2021–2022), formed in 2021 following the death of Chadian President Idriss Déby.
- National Committee of Reconciliation and Development (2021–present), interim military junta of Guinea formed in 2021 following the 2021 Guinea coup d'état.
- Patriotic Movement for Safeguard and Restoration in Burkina Faso (2022–present), formed on 24 January 2022, the group took over after a coup in January. Its leader Paul-Henri Sandaogo Damiba suffered a coup himself later that year. Afterwards, Ibrahim Traoré took power as the leader of the military junta and interim president of Burkina Faso.
- National Transitional Council in Chad (2022–2024), formed in 2022 to replace the Transitional Military Council
- Interim Regional Administration of Tigray (2023–present), a successor to the Transitional Government of Tigray established as a provision of the Ethiopia–Tigray peace agreement which ended the Tigray war.
- (Niger) National Council for the Safeguard of the Homeland (CNSP) (2023–present)
- (Gabon) Committee for the Transition and Restoration of Institutions (2023–2025), established following the 2023 Gabonese coup d'état, dissolved following the 2025 Gabonese presidential election.
- Kamil Idris government (2025–present), announced by the Transitional Sovereignty Council in February 2025 following widespread territorial gains during the third Sudanese civil war. Intended as a technocracy, the government's stated goal is to lay groundwork for free and fair elections in the country.
- Council of the Presidency for the Re-Foundation of the Republic of Madagascar (2025–present), interim military junta of Madagascar following the 2025 Malagasy coup d'état and subsequent dissolution of all national institutions except the National Assembly. The junta is expected to oversee a two-year transitional period culminating in a new presidential election.
- High Military Command for the Restoration of National Security and Public Order (HMCRNSPO) (2025–present), interim military junta of Guinea-Bissau following the 2025 Guinea-Bissau coup d'état.

== Americas ==
=== Pre-19th century ===
- Second Continental Congress (1775–1781), interim ruling body of the United Colonies and United States immediately before and after declaring independence from the British Empire. Following the ratification of the Articles of Confederation, the Continental Congress was absorbed into the Congress of the Confederation, which subsequently became the United States Congress upon ratification of the Constitution.

=== 19th century ===
- Primera Junta (1810), interim ruling body of the Viceroyalty of the Río de la Plata following Baltasar Hidalgo de Cisneros' resignation during the May Revolution. Succeeded by the Junta Grande after seven months in power.
- Junta Grande (1810–1811), successor to the Primera Junta. Aimed to facilitate the transition to a junta that represented all cities in the Viceroyalty of the Río de la Plata, only to meet limited recognition within its own territory. Succeeded by the First Triumvirate.
- Government Junta of Chile (1810), interim government of Chile following the deposition and imprisonment of King Ferdinand VII of Spain by Napoleon.
- Provisional Government of Mexico (1823–1824), interim ruling body of Mexico following the dissolution of the First Mexican Empire. Succeeded by the First Mexican Republic following the ratification of the 1824 Constitution.
- Provisional governorship of José Rondeau (1828–1830), interim ruling body of Uruguay following the Preliminary Peace Convention, in which the Empire of Brazil and the United Provinces of the Río de la Plata recognized the country's independence. Dissolved following Rondeau's resignation.
- Texian Consultation (1835–1836), interim ruling body of Mexican Texas during the Texas Revolution. Ultimately collapsed due to political tensions following the Matamoros Expedition.
- Presidency of David G. Burnet (1836), appointed by the Convention of 1836 in the aftermath of the Texas Declaration of Independence and Mexico's victory in the Battle of the Alamo. Succeeded by the Sam Houston administration following the latter's election as the first official president of the Republic of Texas.
- Provisional Government of Oregon (1841/1843–1849), interim ruling body of Oregon Country formed by settling pioneers in the midst of the Oregon boundary dispute. While the government was established during the Champoeg Meetings in 1841, it did not exercise rule until the adoption of the Organic Laws of Oregon and the meetings' conclusion two years later, with the organic laws specifying that the government would only administer the territory "until such time as the United States of America extend their jurisdiction over us." While the 1846 Oregon Treaty resolved the boundary dispute by formally partitioning the region between the US-administered Oregon Territory and unorganized UK-administered territory (later restructured as the Colony of British Columbia), the provisional government remained in place until the appointment of Joseph Lane as governor.
- Interim government of California (1846–1850), military government of California established during the Mexican–American War. Dissolved following the ratification of the California Statehood Act, which admitted California to the Union as the 31st state.
- U.S. provisional government of New Mexico (1846–1850), interim ruling body of New Mexico following the region's occupation by the United States during the Mexican–American War. Succeeded by the New Mexico Territory in 1850 before being admitted to the Union as the 47th state in 1912.
- State of Deseret (1849–1850), established by Mormon settlers with the intent of forming a theodemocratic US state within territory seized in the Mexican Cession. Dissolved following the Compromise of 1850, which established the Utah Territory.
- Provisional Congress of the Confederate States (1861–1862), interim ruling body of the Confederate States of America following the member states' secession from the United States of America. Dissolved following the election and inauguration of Jefferson Davis as President of the Confederate States of America.
- Georgia Constitutional Convention of 1861, interim ruling body of the State of Georgia during the leadup to its secession from the United States.
- Confederate government of Kentucky (1861–c. 1865), a shadow government formed by pro-Confederate state legislators in Kentucky. Though it never replaced the official state government, it was recognized by and admitted to the Confederate States of America. No documentation exists regarding when the provisional government dissolved, but historians assume that it did so upon the conclusion of the American Civil War.
- Missouri Constitutional Convention of 1861–1863, formed as a constituent assembly to vote on whether or not to secede from the United States during the American Civil War before restructuring itself as a provisional state government following the outbreak of violence between pro-Union and pro-Confederacy factions.
- Provisional Government of Saskatchewan (1885), formed by revolting Métis during the North-West Rebellion. Dissolved following Canada's victory in the Battle of Batoche.
- Military Government of Cuba (1898–1902), established after Spain ceded Cuba to the United States following the Spanish–American War. Dissolved following the ratification of the Platt Amendment and the establishment of the Republic of Cuba.
- Military Government of Porto Rico (1898–1900), established after Spain ceded Puerto Rico to the United States following the Spanish–American War. Dissolved following the ratification of the Foraker Act, which established the Insular Government of Porto Rico.

=== 20th century ===
- Provisional Government of Cuba (1906–1909), a military occupation government established by the United States following the collapse of Tomás Estrada Palma's administration. Dissolved following the election of José Miguel Gómez, after which American officials deemed the country sufficiently restabilized.
- Socialist Republic of Chile (1932), formed by the government junta which overthrew president Juan Esteban Montero. Dissolved shortly after its establishment due to widespread public opposition.
- Pentarchy of 1933, interim ruling body of Cuba following the deposition of Gerardo Machado. Ousted after five days in power by the Directorio Estudiantil Universitario, which appointed the One Hundred Days Government in their place.
- One Hundred Days Government (1933–1934), interim ruling body of Cuba after the Pentarchy of 1933 was ousted by the Directorio Estudiantil Universitario. Overthrown in a military coup by Fulgencio Batista, who installed Carlos Mendieta as president of Cuba.
- Commission of Government of Newfoundland (1934–1949), following the Newfoundland Royal Commission of 1933, which found Newfoundland was incapable of running its own finances, the dominion ended self-governance to return to full British rule. Although supposed to be temporary, it lasted for 15 years; Newfoundland would never return to responsible government.
- Government Junta of Bolivia (1946–1947), established following the ousting of Gualberto Villarroel and the Revolutionary Nationalist Movement in the 1946 La Paz riots. Dissolved following the election and inauguration of Enrique Hertzog as President of Bolivia.
- Founding Council (1948–1949), interim government of Costa Rica led by president José Figueres Ferrer, established following the overthrow of Teodoro Picado Michalski in the Costa Rican Civil War. Dissolved after Ferrer stepped down in favor of Otilio Ulate Blanco.
- Republic of New Afrika (1968–present), established as a black nationalist and black separatist provisional government in opposition to the federal government of the United States, with the intent of creating an independent country in present-day East Texas, Louisiana, Mississippi, Alabama, Georgia, South Carolina, and North Florida.
- Greater Ameridia Patria (1973), a proposed Native American ethnostate covering parts of South Dakota and Nebraska envisioned by the NAARP which would have a socialist government and strong political ties with Asian countries. The NAARP submitted a 28-point platform to the United Nations on May 18, 1973 to have their nation admitted as a member state.
- People's Revolutionary Government (1979–1983), interim ruling body of Grenada following the New Jewel Movement's takeover of the government. Overthrown in the United States invasion of Grenada, which installed the Interim Advisory Council, headed by Paul Scoon, with Nicholas Brathwaite as prime minister.
- Junta of National Reconstruction (1979–1985), interim ruling body of Nicaragua after the overthrow of Anastasio Somoza Debayle during the Nicaraguan Revolution. Dissolved following the election and inauguration of Daniel Ortega as president.
- Interim Advisory Council (1983–1984), interim ruling body of Grenada following the deposition of the People's Revolutionary Government during the American invasion. Dissolved following the 1984 Grenadian general election, which resulted in the formation of a new cabinet headed by Herbert Blaize as prime minister.
- National Council of Government (1986–1988), interim ruling body of Haiti, after the departure of Jean-Claude Duvalier.

=== 21st century ===
- Interim government of Pedro Carmona (2002), established during the 2002 Venezuelan coup attempt following the overthrow of president Hugo Chávez. Dissolved following Chávez's return to power in the wake of the coup's failure.
- Interim government of Juan Guaidó (2019–2022), established in January 2019 by the National Assembly led by Juan Guaidó, in dispute with the incumbent government of the Bolivarian Republic of Venezuela led by Nicolás Maduro during the Venezuelan presidential crisis. The transitional government was supported and recognized by the United States, the European Union, the Lima Group, and many other Western countries, ultimately dissolving in 2022 upon declaring that it had failed to achieve its goals.
- Presidency of Francisco Sagasti (2020–2021), established on November 17, 2020, as a result of various political and economic hardships during the Peruvian political crisis and the COVID-19 pandemic, including two presidential impeachments and one presidential resignation. Political analysts in Peru characterized the administration as a "transitional government" and an "emergency government," which was eventually succeeded by the Bellido cabinet following the inauguration of Pedro Castillo on July 28, 2021.
- Transitional Presidential Council (2024–2026), established in April 2024 to exercise the powers and duties of the President of Haiti either until an elected president is inaugurated or until 7 February 2026. The council was officially sworn in as the head of state of Haiti following the resignation of acting prime minister Ariel Henry on 24 April. Dissolved upon the 7 February 2026 deadline, with presidential powers being transferred to acting prime minister Alix Didier Fils-Aimé.

== Asia ==
=== Pre-World War I ===
- Judean provisional government (66–68), formed by rebelling Pharisees and Sadducees during the First Jewish–Roman War with the intent of establishing a Halachic state in Judea. Dissolved following the massacre of its members during the Zealot Temple siege.
- Revolutionary Government of the Philippines (1898–1899), established in the Spanish East Indies during the Spanish–American War. Succeeded by the First Philippine Republic following the promulgation of the Malolos Constitution.
- Military Government of the Philippine Islands (1898–1902), established after the United States' military victory in the Battle of Manila and formalized by the Treaty of Paris, which officially ceded the territory from Spain. Succeeded by the Insular Government of the Philippine Islands following the Philippine–American War and the passage of the Philippine Organic Act.
- Tianjin Provisional Government (1900–1902), formed by the Eight-Nation Alliance to administer territory recaptured from the Boxer movement during the Boxer Rebellion. Dissolved after ceding control of the Tianjin area back to the Qing dynasty, though the Eight-Nation Alliance maintained a military presence to ensure open access to Beijing.
- Provisional Government of the Republic of China (1912), established after the success of the Wuchang uprising

=== World War I and Interbellum ===
- Provisional Government of India (1915), government-in-exile based in Kabul, Afghanistan
- Republic of Van (1915), established as a puppet government of the Russian Empire in occupied Western Armenia. Dissolved in the Treaty of Brest-Litovsk following the February Revolution and the Russian Soviet Federative Socialist Republic's withdrawal from World War I.
- Alash Orda (1917–1918), established as the interim governing body of the newly formed Alash Autonomy in opposition to rival Bolshevik councils aligned with Vladimir Lenin.
- Turkestan Autonomy (1917–1918), established in the former territory of Russian Turkestan following the expulsion of the Russian Provisional Government by the Tashkent Soviet, with whom the Autonomy shared de facto dual power. Ultimately dissolved in the aftermath of a civil conflict following a failed coup against the Soviet, who subsequently established the Turkestan Autonomous Soviet Socialist Republic.
- Provisional Siberian Government (Omsk) (1918), established following the Czechoslovak Legion's uprising during the Russian Civil War and consequent recapture of Siberia by the White Army. Dissolved two months later following a coup by Alexander Kolchak, which resulted in the government's collapse and cession of its powers to the Provisional All-Russian Government.
- Provisional Regional Government of the Urals (1918), a short-lived anti-Bolshevik state within the territory of the Russian Soviet Federative Socialist Republic. Voluntarily dissolved after two months, ceding power to the Provisional All-Russian Government.
- South West Caucasian Republic (1919), established in Kars
- Provisional Government of the Republic of Korea (1919), established in exile based in Shanghai, China and later in Chongqing, during the Japanese occupation of Korea
- Jewish National Council (1920–1948), established by the Assembly of Representatives in Mandatory Palestine as the main executive body of the entity's Jewish community. Succeeded by the provisional government of Israel after declaring independence in 1948.
- Provisional Government of Mongolia (1921–1924), established by the Central Committee of the Mongolian People's Party upon the organization's formation in Kyakhta. Succeeded by the Mongolian People's Republic following the ratification of the first constitution.
- Tungus Republic (1924–1925), a short-lived unrecognized secessionist state formed within Okhotsky and the eastern Yakut Autonomous Soviet Socialist Republic. Dissolved and reabsorbed into the Soviet Union following peace talks between the two.
- Commonwealth of the Philippines (1935–1946), established by the Tydings–McDuffie Act to replace the Insular Government of the Philippine Islands and facilitate the transition to independence from the United States. From 1942 to 1945, the Commonwealth operated as a government-in-exile in opposition to the Japanese occupation of the Philippines and consequent establishment of the Second Philippine Republic as a puppet state. Ultimately succeeded by the independent Third Republic of the Philippines following the ratification of the 1946 Treaty of Manila.

=== World War II ===
- Provisional Government of the Republic of China (1937–40), established by the Empire of Japan after its invasion of Eastern China
- Provisional Government of Free India (1943–1945), commonly known as Azad Hind, established by Indian nationalists in southeast Asia, had nominal sovereignty over Axis-controlled Indian territories, and had diplomatic relationships with eleven countries including Germany, Italy, Japan, Philippines, and the Soviet Union. It was headed by Subhas Chandra Bose, who was the Head of the State and Prime Minister, who was also Supreme Commander of the Indian National Army. The government had its own cabinet and banks, and was the first government to recruit women for combat roles.
- Investigating Committee for Preparatory Work for Independence and Preparatory Committee for Indonesian Independence (1945), established at the close of World War II following the Allied reconquest of Japanese-occupied Asia by Indonesian rebels and Japanese advisors. Future Indonesian President Sukarno and Vice President Mohammed Hatta were largely involved in both organizations, and they were ultimately succeeded by the present-day Government of Indonesia in accordance with the Constitution of Indonesia (which was drafted during the two committees' existence).

=== Cold War ===
- People's Republic of Korea (1945–1946), a provisional government established following the surrender of Japan at the conclusion of World War II, which resulted in the restoration of Korean independence. Following the division of Korea, the PRK was outlawed by the United States in favor of the American military government, while the Soviet Union incorporated it into the Provisional People's Committee of North Korea.
- United States Army Military Government in Korea (1945–1948), an interim government formed by the United States concurrently with the People's Republic of Korea following the peninsula's independence from Japan. Later incorporated into South Korea following the division of Korea and the American ban on the People's Republic.
- Provisional People's Committee of North Korea (1946–1947), an interim government formed by the Soviet Civil Administration following the division of Korea and the absorption of the People's Republic of Korea. Succeeded by the People's Committee of North Korea.
- Interim Government of India (1946–1947), an interim government formed by the newly created Constituent Assembly of India to administer what would become the Dominion of India and the Dominion of Pakistan in the transitional period between British rule and independence.
- People's Committee of North Korea (1947–1948), the successor government to the Provisional People's Committee of North Korea during the latter period of Soviet occupation. Ultimately incorporated into North Korea.
- Emergency Government of the Republic of Indonesia (1948–1949), an emergency government established by Sjafruddin Prawiranegara in Sumatra following the capture of Yogyakarta, the then-Indonesian capital, by the Netherlands. Dissolved following the Roem–Van Roijen Agreement.
- Provisional government of Israel (1948–1949), successor to the Jewish National Council, established after Israel's declaration of independence and in place until after the first Knesset elections.
- Provisional Central Government of Vietnam (1948–1949), established as a puppet government by French during the First Indochina War. Succeeded by the State of Vietnam.
- Provisional Government of the Syrian Arab Republic (1949), established by national consensus to draft a new constitution and reintroduce civilian rule after a series of military governments.
- State of Vietnam (1949–1955), formed as a successor to the Provisional Central Government of Vietnam during the First Indochina War. Succeeded by South Vietnam following the 1954 Geneva Conference, which ceded the northern half of the country to North Vietnam.
- Revolutionary Government of the Republic of Indonesia (1958–1961), established in opposition to the Sukarno administration. Dissolved following the withdrawal of American support and the failure of its and the Permesta's rebellion against the government.
- National Council for the Revolutionary Command (1963), interim ruling body of Syria following the 1963 Syrian coup d'état.
- Provisional Turkish Cypriot Administration (1967–1971), formed by Turkish Cypriots in the wake of the 1967 Greek coup d'état and subsequent worsening of intercommunal violence. Dissolved four years after its establishment, but succeeded by the Autonomous Turkish Cypriot Administration and Turkish Federated State of Cyprus following the Turkish invasion of Cyprus.
- National Operations Council (1969-1971), established after the 13 May incident
- Provisional Revolutionary Government of the Republic of South Vietnam (1969–1976), established during the Vietnam War against the United States and Republic of Vietnam
- Provisional Government of the People's Republic of Bangladesh (1970–1972), established after the declaration of freedom of Bengalis exiled to Calcutta.
- Sayem ministry (1975–1978), interim government of Bangladesh following the assassination of Khaled Mosharraf. Dissolved after Abu Sadat Mohammad Sayem's successor, Ziaur Rahman, formed a provisional Council of Ministers in advance of the 1979 Bangladeshi general election.
- Provisional Government of East Timor (1975–1976), established as a puppet state following the success of the Indonesian invasion of East Timor. Ultimately dissolved following the country's annexation as a province of Indonesia.
- Regency Council (1979), formed by Mohammad Reza Pahlavi to manage regnal duties following his flight from Iran during the Iranian Revolution. Dissolved just days after its establishment after the resignation of council head Jalaleddin Tehrani.
- Interim Government of Iran (1979) (1979), a provisional government established after the Iranian Revolution. Dissolved and replaced by the Council of the Islamic Revolution following the onset of the Iran hostage crisis.
- Interim Government of Iran (1979–80) formed by the Council of the Islamic Revolution to succeed the Interim Government of Iran (1979) in the wake of the Iran hostage crisis. Dissolved upon the establishment of the first Islamic Consultative Assembly.
- Interim Government of Iran (1981), established following the assassinations of president Mohammad-Ali Rajai and prime minister Mohammad-Javad Bahonar in the 1981 Iranian Prime Minister's office bombing. Per the terms of Iran's constitution, the government consisted of a presidential council which appointed Mohammad-Reza Mahdavi Kani as interim prime minister. Succeeded by the first premiership of Mir-Hossein Mousavi following his appointment by newly elected president Ali Khamenei.
- National Council of Resistance of Iran (1981–present), formed by the People's Mujahedin of Iran based in Paris and later Albania. It serves as a government-in-exile opposing the clerical government.
- South Lebanon security belt administration (1985–2000), established to administer Israeli-occupied Lebanon following the dissolution of the State of Free Lebanon during the 1982 Lebanon War. Dissolved following Hezbollah's victory in the South Lebanon conflict and the subsequent collapse of the South Lebanon Army.
- Provisional Government of the Philippines (1986–1987), established after the People Power Revolution. Dissolved following the ratification of the current Constitution of the Philippines.
- Executive Committee of the Palestine Liberation Organization (1988–present), after it was entrusted with the powers and responsibilities of the Provisional Government of the State of Palestine.

=== 1990s ===
- Shahabuddin Ahmed ministry (1990–1991), interim government of Bangladesh formed following the resignation of Hussain Muhammad Ershad during the 1990 uprising. Dissolved following the election and inauguration of Khaleda Zia as prime minister.
- Republic of Kuwait (1990), established as a puppet state by Ba'athist Iraq during the Gulf War. Subsequently annexed and divided into the Kuwait Governorate and the Saddamiyat al-Mitla' District before Iraq's withdrawal at the end of the war.
- United Nations Transitional Authority in Cambodia (1992–1993), formed following the 1991 Paris Peace Agreements to govern and stabilize Cambodia following the Cambodian–Vietnamese War and the Third Indochina War. Dissolved following the restoration of the Cambodian monarchy and consequent reestablishment of the Kingdom of Cambodia.
- Khmer Rouge unrecognized government (1994–1998), an opposition government formed by remnants of the Khmer Rouge following the establishment of the Kingdom of Cambodia and the withdrawal of the United Nations Transitional Authority in Cambodia. Dissolved due to widespread pro-peace sentiment among those left in the Khmer Rouge after the death of Pol Pot.
- Palestinian National Authority (1994–present), the administrative organization, established to govern parts of the West Bank and Gaza Strip, following the Oslo Accords.
- Provisional Legislative Council (1996/1997–1998), interim legislature of Hong Kong in the leadup to and immediately following the handover to China. While the council was formed in 1996, it did not exercise rule until the following January.
- United Nations Transitional Administration in East Timor (1999–2002), formed in the wake of the 1999 East Timorese independence referendum with the aim of facilitating a resolution to the province's political crisis. Dissolved following the reestablishment of Timor-Leste as an internationally recognized independent nation, with the transitional administration's resources being transferred to the United Nations Mission of Support to East Timor.

=== 21st century ===
As of 2026 in Asia, Palestine, Syria, and Yemen currently have provisional governments.

==== 2000s ====
- Afghan Interim Administration (2001–2002), established following the overthrow of the first Islamic Emirate of Afghanistan during the War in Afghanistan. Succeeded by the Transitional Islamic State of Afghanistan.
- Transitional Islamic State of Afghanistan (2002–2004), formed as the successor to the Afghan Interim Administration. Succeeded by the Islamic Republic of Afghanistan following the election and inauguration of the First Karzai cabinet.
- Coalition Provisional Authority in Iraq (2003–2004) with the Iraqi Interim Governing Council, established to act as a caretaker administration in Iraq following the 2003 invasion of Iraq pending the hand over of power to the Iraqi people and the creation of a democratically elected civilian government.
- Iraqi Interim Government (2004–2005) and the Iraqi Transitional Government (2005–2006) were both provisional authorities established after the hand over of power to the Iraqi people following the 2003 invasion of Iraq to govern pending the adoption of a permanent constitution.
- Interim legislature of Nepal (2006–2008), formed in the aftermath of the 2006 Nepalese revolution. Following the Comprehensive Peace Accord which ended the Nepalese Civil War, the legislature was restructured as a unicameral body, with the Nepalese monarchy's powers heavily restricted. Dissolved shortly before the 2008 Nepalese Constituent Assembly election and the abolition of the monarchy.
- 2006 Thai interim civilian government, established by the Council for National Security following the 2006 Thai coup d'état. Dissolved following the enacting of the 2007 constitution of Thailand.

==== 2010s ====
- Syrian Interim Government (2013–2025), established by the Syrian National Coalition during the Syrian Civil War. Ultimately absorbed into the Syrian caretaker government following the fall of the Assad regime.
- Supreme Revolutionary Committee (2015–2016), established by the Houthi Movement after the Houthi takeover of Yemen. Succeeded by the Supreme Political Council in 2016.
- Supreme Political Council (2016–present), formed to govern Houthi-controlled Yemen following the partial handover of power from the Supreme Revolutionary Committee. Currently participating in the Yemeni Civil War (2014–present) against the governments of Abdrabbuh Mansur Hadi and the Presidential Leadership Council
- Southern Transitional Council of South Yemen (2016–2026), established by the separatist Southern Movement during the Yemeni civil war with the intent of reestablishing an independent polity within the former borders of South Yemen. Dissolved under disputed circumstances following its defeat in the 2025–2026 Southern Yemen campaign.
- Syrian Salvation Government (2017–2024), established by Hayat Tahrir al-Sham in the Idlib Governorate. Ultimately absorbed into the Syrian caretaker government following the fall of the Assad regime.

==== 2020s ====
- Interim government of Kyrgyzstan (2020–2021), established in 2020 in the aftermath of the 2020 Kyrgyzstani protests
- National Unity Government of Myanmar (2021–present), established in exile by the Committee Representing Pyidaungsu Hluttaw in opposition to the 2021 Myanmar coup d'état
- Military cabinet of Min Aung Hlaing (2021–2025), established by the State Administration Council as a formalization of its rule six months after the 2021 Myanmar coup d'état Succeeded by the Cabinet of Nyo Saw following the lifting of Myanmar's state of emergency.
- Presidential Leadership Council (2022–present), established by internationally recognized outgoing president Abdrabbuh Mansur Hadi to seek a "comprehensive political solution" to the Yemeni Civil War
- Israeli war cabinet (2023–2024), established following the outbreak of the Gaza war and Israeli prime minister Benjamin Netanyahu's declaration of a state of emergency. The war cabinet was later dissolved after former ministers Benny Gantz and Gadi Eisenkott left the coalition.
- Karenni State Interim Executive Council (2023–present), formed by Karenni resistance groups during the Myanmar civil war in opposition to the State Administration Council.
- Hamas temporary committee (2024–2026), established following the assassination of Ismail Haniyeh to facilitate communication with chairman Yahya Sinwar and maintain governance of Hamas during the Gaza war. Later transitioned to committee rule following Sinwar's own killing. Ultimately dissolved in 2026 following the appointment of Khalil al-Hayya as leader.
- Interim government of Muhammad Yunus (2024–2026), formed following the resignation of prime minister Sheikh Hasina and consequent dissolution of the 12th Jatiya Sangsad during the July Uprising. The interim government remained in office until Tarique Rahman was appointed as Prime Minister of Bangladesh following the 2026 Bangladeshi general election.
- Syrian caretaker government (2024–2025), established following the fall of the Assad regime during the Syrian civil war. Syrian Salvation Government leader Ahmed al-Sharaa announced the transitional administration's formation on Telegram, while National Coalition president Hadi al-Bahra stated that the government's goals are to draft a new constitution and establish "a safe, neutral, and quiet environment" for free elections within 18 months. Succeeded by the Syrian transitional government in 2025.
- Syrian transitional government (2025–present), established by Syrian president Ahmed al-Sharaa to implement the five-year transitional period dictated by the Constitutional Declaration of Syria.
- Karki interim cabinet (2025–2026), established following the resignation of Nepalese prime minister K. P. Sharma Oli during the 2025 Nepalese Gen Z protests. Dissolved following the appointment of Balen Shah as prime minister in the wake of the Rastriya Swatantra Party's victory in the 2026 Nepalese general election.
- (Palestine) Board of Peace and National Committee for the Administration of Gaza (2026–present), mandated by the United Nations to manage, respectively, the reconstruction and daily governance of the Gaza Strip in the aftermath of the Gaza war (under Resolution 2803).
- Interim Leadership Council (2026), established following the assassination of Ali Khamenei in the 2026 Iran war, per Article 111 of the Constitution of Iran. Per the terms of the constitution, the council remained in place until the appointment of Mojtaba Khamenei as his father's successor in the 2026 Iranian supreme leader election.

== Europe ==
=== 1600s ===
- Confederate Ireland (1642–1652), formed by Catholic aristocrats, landed gentry, clergy, and military leaders after the Irish Rebellion of 1641. Overthrown by the Commonwealth of England in the Cromwellian conquest of Ireland.
- First English Council of State (1649–1653), appointed by the Rump Parliament following the execution of Charles I. Dissolved by the Instrument of Government, which appointed Oliver Cromwell as Lord Protector.
- Second English Council of State (1659–1660), formed following the collapse of the Richard Cromwell administration. Dissolved following the reestablishment of the English monarchy in the Stuart Restoration.

=== 1700s ===
- National Convention (1792–1795), interim ruling body of the Kingdom of France and the French First Republic during the French Revolution. Succeeded by the French Directory following the fall of Maximilien Robespierre and the drafting of a new constitution.
- Provisional Council of the Duchy of Masovia (1794), interim government of the Masovian Voivodeship established during the Kościuszko Uprising. Ultimately subordinated to the Supreme National Council.
- Provisional Representatives of the People of Holland (1795–1796), interim government of the Batavian Republic following the abolition of the Dutch Republic in the Batavian Revolution. Abolished following the States General of the Batavian Republic's replacement by the National Assembly.

=== 1800s ===
- Lithuanian Provisional Governing Commission (1812–1813), established by Napoleon during the French invasion of Russia. On July 14, 1812, it joined the General Confederation of the Kingdom of Poland, thus reaffirming the Polish–Lithuanian Union.
- Provisional Government of Belgium (1814–1815), interim ruling body of the Southern Netherlands following the collapse of French rule during the War of the Sixth Coalition. Dissolved following the annexation of the region by the United Kingdom of the Netherlands.
- French Provisional Government of 1814, interim ruling body of the First French Empire following the surrender of Paris and deposition of Napoleon during the War of the Sixth Coalition. Succeeded by the government of the first Bourbon restoration following Louis XVIII's return to the throne and the reestablishment of the Kingdom of France.
- French Provisional Government of 1815, formed following the reestablished First French Empire's defeat in the Battle of Waterloo during the Hundred Days in opposition to the Napoleonic government, resulting in Napoleon's second abdication. Succeeded by the Ministry of Charles-Maurice de Talleyrand-Périgord following Louis XVIII's second return to the throne and the second reestablishment of the Kingdom of France.
- First Hellenic Republic (1822–1832), established by anti-Ottoman rebels during the Greek War of Independence. Succeeded by the Kingdom of Greece following the assassination of Augustinos Kapodistrias and subsequent intervention by Great Britain, France and Russia.
- Provisional Government of Belgium (1830–1831), established as a successor to the Revolutionary Committee following the success of the Belgian Revolution. Dissolved following the proclamation of the Constitution of Belgium and the consequent establishment of the Kingdom of Belgium.
- Paris Municipal Commission Ministry of 1830 and French Provisional Ministry of 1830, successive interim administrations formed following the overthrow of the restored Bourbon monarchy in the July Revolution. Succeeded by the first ministry of Louis Philippe I following his ascension to the French throne.
- Wellington caretaker ministry (1834), interim ruling body of the United Kingdom of Great Britain and Ireland following William IV's dismissal of William Lamb's administration. Arthur Wellesley recommended Robert Peel as Lamb's successor; because Peel was in the Kingdom of Sardinia at the time, Wellesley headed a caretaker administration until Peel's return to Britain.
- French Provisional Government of 1848, interim ruling body of the French Second Republic established after the French Revolution of 1848, which ended the July Monarchy. Succeeded by the French Executive Commission of 1848.
- Provisional Government of Milan (1848), formed by Milanese insurgents during the First Italian War of Independence. Dissolved following the Austrian Empire's victory in the Battle of Custoza.
- Guvernul vremelnicesc (1848), formed by revolutionary forces during the Wallachian Revolution of 1848. Dissolved following the Ottoman Empire's intervention in the battle of Dealul Spirii.
- Warsaw Dictator Executive Commission and National Civil Government (1863), interim ruling bodies of Congress Poland during the January Uprising, formed as the successor to the underground Polish National Government. The coexisting provisional governments were both de jure ruled by Marian Langiewicz, whose arrest led to their dissolution in favor of a single coalition government.
- Government of National Defense (1870–1871), interim ruling body of the French Third Republic following the collapse of the Second French Empire during the Franco-Prussian War. Replaced by the Cabinet Dufaure I following the 1871 French legislative election.

=== World War I and Interbellum ===
- Provisional Government of Albania (1912–1914), established after the First Balkan War
- Provisional Government of Western Thrace (1913), established in modern Greece in opposition to annexation by Bulgaria during the Second Balkan War.
- Provisional Government of Northern Epirus (1914), established against annexation to Albania.
- Provisional Government of the Irish Republic (1916), a title adopted by the leadership of the short-lived Easter Rising.
- Provisional Government of National Defence (1916), alternative government established in the city of Thessaloniki in northern Greece
- Provisional Council of State (1917), interim government of the Kingdom of Poland based on the Act of 5th November. Collapsed following the resignation of Józef Piłsudski and the subsequent oath crisis, resulting in the Temporary Committee of the Provisional Council of State forming to replace it.
- Czechoslovak National Council (1918), interim ruling body of the First Czechoslovak Republic following its independence from Austria-Hungary.
- State of Slovenes, Croats and Serbs, (1918) established in 1918 as the unrecognized first incarnation of Yugoslavia and later merged with the Kingdoms of Serbia and Montenegro to form the Kingdom of Serbs, Croats, and Slovenes.
- Estonian Provisional Government (1918–1919)
- Council of the People's Deputies (1918–1919), formed by the German Empire's main socialist parties during the German Revolution before adopting a big tent policy and facilitating the transition to a republican government. Succeeded by the Scheidemann cabinet, the first government of the Weimar Republic, following the 1919 German federal election.
- Latvian Provisional Government (1918–1920)
- Provisional People's Government of the Republic of Poland (1918), established following Austria-Hungary's Parliamentary motion in favor of restoring Polish independence. Dissolved following the ascension of Józef Piłsudski as head of state and the establishment of the Second Polish Republic.
- Ukrainian Provisional Government (1918)
- Provisional Government of the Northern Region (1918–1920)
- Bessarabian Soviet Socialist Republic (1919), established as a revolutionary committee, under patronage from the Russian Soviet Federative Socialist Republic, with the intent of creating a Soviet republic in Bessarabia. Dissolved after Anton Denikin captured Odesa, where the BSSR operated.
- Security Council of the Northern Caucasus and Dagestan (1919–1920), interim government of Dagestan following the collapse and exodus of the Mountainous Republic of the Northern Caucasus. Dissolved following the Bolshevik takeover and the 11th Army's capture of the Northern Caucasus.
- Provisional Governing Commission (1920–1922), established as the ruling body of the Republic of Central Lithuania, a puppet state of the Second Polish Republic formed during the Polish–Lithuanian War. Dissolved after the Legislative Sejm voted to absorb the state into Poland.
- Provisional Government of Ireland (1922), established by the Anglo-Irish Treaty between the British government and Irish revolutionaries, in order to pave the way for the establishment of the Irish Free State in the same year.

=== World War II ===
- Provisional Popular Revolutionary Government of Chechnya-Ingushetia (c. 1940–1944), established by the Chechen Revolutionary Detachment in the aftermath of the Soviet Union's failure to capture Finland during the Winter War with the intent of attaining Checheno-Ingush independence. Dissolved following the Soviet Union's victory in the 1940–1944 insurgency in Chechnya and the deportation of the Chechens and Ingush.
- Vichy France (1940–1944), established following the Battle of France and Armistice of 22 June 1940. Dissolved following the liberation of France and the installation of the Provisional Government of the French Republic.
- Provisional Government of Lithuania (1941), established when Lithuanians overthrew the Soviet occupation during the June Uprising. It functioned briefly until the German occupation of Lithuania.
- Provisional National Government of Hungary (1944–1945) (Ideiglenes Nemzeti Kormány)
- Provisional Government of the Democratic Federal Yugoslavia (1945)
- French Committee of National Liberation (Comité Français de Libération Nationale, CFLN) (1943–1944), set up in Algiers, then a part of metropolitan France.
- Provisional Government of the French Republic (GPRF) (1944–1946), government of the provisional Republic following the liberation of France and consequent dissolution of the Vichy government until the establishment of the Fourth Republic.
- Italian partisan republics (1944), formed by various segments of the Italian resistance movement in opposition to the Italian Social Republic. Each of them were reconquered by the Wehrmacht within weeks of their establishment.
- Democratic Government of Albania (1944–1946), formed by the National Liberation Movement following the successful expulsion of the German occupation. Succeeded by the People's Republic of Albania after interim prime minister Enver Hoxha's expulsion of king Zog I and the Democratic Front of Albania's dominance of the 1945 Albanian parliamentary election.
- Provisional Government of the Republic of Poland (1944–1945), established by the State National Council with the intention of creating a Soviet-aligned communist Poland, contrary to the western-aligned Polish government-in-exile (which it did not recognize). Succeeded by the Provisional Government of National Unity.
- Flensburg Government (1945), established following the suicides of Adolf Hitler and Joseph Goebbels during the closing days of the Third Reich.
- Provisional Government of National Unity (1945–1947), established as the successor to the Provisional Government of the Republic of Poland. Dissolved following the establishment of the Polish People's Republic.
- Interim National Assembly (1945–1946), provisional ruling body of the Third Czechoslovak Republic. Succeeded by the Constituent National Assembly following the 1946 election.

Provisional governments were also established throughout Europe as occupied nations were liberated from Nazi occupation by the Allies.

=== Cold War ===
- Provisional Democratic Government (1947–1950), formed by the Communist Party of Greece during the Greek Civil War as the successor to the World War II-era Political Committee of National Liberation. Withdrew from their territories in northern Greece after their defeat during Operation Pyrsos in 1949 and continued as a government-in-exile before dissolving fourteen months later.
- Revolutionary Workers'-Peasants' Government of Hungary (1956), interim government of the Hungarian People's Republic established by pro-Soviet forces during the Hungarian Revolution of 1956, in opposition to the revolutionary-backed governments of Imre Nagy. Succeeded by the mainline János Kádár government following the Soviet invasion of Hungary and consequent suppression of the third Nagy government.
- National Salvation Junta and six provisional governments that followed after the Carnation Revolution and until the first democratically elected government under the new Constitution was sworn in (25 April 1974 – 23 July 1976)

=== Collapse of the USSR and aftermath ===
- Government of National Understanding, established in Czechoslovakia after the Velvet Revolution of 1989.
- National Salvation Front (1989–1990), established in Romania after the fall and execution of Nicolae Ceaușescu and the end of the Socialist Republic of Romania in 1989. Later restructured into a big tent political party following the establishment of a post-communist successor government in 1990, winning the general election that year before breaking up into the Democratic National Salvation Front and the Democratic Party in 1992.
- Estonian Interim Government (1990–1992)
- Ukraine's transitional government (1991–1996) formed after the 1991 Ukrainian independence referendum, which dissolved the Ukrainian Soviet Socialist Republic and formalized Ukraine's independence from the Soviet Union. Officially declared the legal successor of the Ukrainian SSR after Mykola Plaviuk, president of the government in exile, ceded his powers to Leonid Kravchuk, the winner of the 1991 Ukrainian presidential election. Ultimately succeeded by the current government following a parliamentary motion to adopt a new constitution, ending the post-Soviet transition.
- United Nations Transitional Administration for Eastern Slavonia, Baranja and Western Sirmium (1996–1998), formed to peacefully reintegrate self-proclaimed Eastern Slavonia, Baranja and Western Syrmia to Croatia after the signing of the 1995 Erdut Agreement.
- United Nations Interim Administration Mission in Kosovo (1999–de facto 2008), formed to stabilize Kosovo in the aftermath of the Kosovo War. Never formally dissolved, but de facto replaced by the Republic of Kosovo after unilaterally declaring independence in 2008.

=== 21st century ===
As of 2025 in Europe, only Belarus and territories of European Russia and Ukraine occupied by each other during the Russian invasion of Ukraine have provisional governments. The former was established by the opposition in parallel with the government of the Republic of Belarus, while the latter two exist as occupation governments in opposition to the government of Russia and the government of Ukraine, respectively.

- Provisional Institutions of Self-Government (2002–de facto 2008), established by the United Nations Interim Administration Mission in Kosovo to facilitate local governance. Like the UN administration, the provisional institutions were never formally dissolved, but were de facto replaced by the Republic of Kosovo following the 2008 Kosovo declaration of independence.
- Belarusian Coordination Council (2020–present) and the United Transitional Cabinet of Belarus (2022–present), established in the aftermath of the 2020 Belarusian presidential election and during subsequent protests. The transitional government is supported and recognized by Lithuania.
- Russian temporary administrative agencies in occupied Ukraine (2022–present), a series of puppet governments installed in the Russian-occupied territories of Ukraine during the Russian invasion of Ukraine.
- Military commandant's office for the Kursk region (2024–present), provisional administration established to administer parts of Kursk Oblast controlled by Ukraine.

== Oceania ==
- Provisional Government of Hawaii (1893–1894), established in 1893 after the overthrow of the Kingdom of Hawaii and renamed to the Republic of Hawaii in 1894.
- Naval Government of Guam (1898–1950), established by the United States following its capture during the Spanish–American War. Dissolved following the Guam Organic Act of 1950, which established Guam as an unincorporated organized territory.
- 1901 caretaker government of Australia, established pending the first election to the newly established Commonwealth of Australia.
- Vanuaaku People's Provisional Government (1977–1978), established in the New Hebrides Condominium by Walter Lini as a precursor to the Republic of Vanuatu which was internationally recognised as independent in 1980.

== Transcontinental entities ==
As of 2026, only Russia has a provisional government, which exists parallel and in opposition to the current government of Russia.

- Provisional Government of Spain (1868–1871), established after the Spanish Glorious Revolution pending the election of a new Constitutional Monarch.
- Provisional government of the Portuguese Republic (1910–1911), established in the aftermath of the Republican Revolution that overthrow the Portuguese monarchy.
- Russian Provisional Government (1917), established as a result of the February Revolution which led to the abdication of Tsar Nicholas II.
- Provisional All-Russian Government (1918), a short-lived anti-communist government formed during the Russian Civil War. Overthrown by the white movement in the Kolchak Coup and replaced by the 1918—1919 Russian government.
- Russian Government (1918–1919), a military government formed by the white movement following the overthrow of the Provisional All-Russian Government in the Kolchak Coup. Dissolved during the fall of Omsk, with its members forming the South Russian Government and Eastern Okraina the following year.
- Government of the Grand National Assembly (1920–1923), established as an alternative government to the Allied-occupied Ottoman Empire during the Turkish War of Independence.
- Provisional Government of the Second Spanish Republic (1931), interim ruling body of the Second Spanish Republic following the deposition of King Alfonso XIII. Dissolved following the establishment of a regular government by the Spanish Constitution of 1931.
- Spanish transition to democracy (1977–1981), instituted by King Juan Carlos I following the death of Francisco Franco. Following the 1977 Spanish general election, the transition shifted from reforming the institutions of Francoist Spain to reshaping it into a constitutional monarchy. Concluded with the landslide victory of the Spanish Socialist Workers' Party in the 1982 Spanish general election.
- State Committee on the State of Emergency (1991), formed by the leaders of the 1991 Soviet coup d'état attempt. Dissolved after the coup's failure, with Mikhail Gorbachev being reinstated as the Soviet head of state.

=== 21st century ===
- Administration of South Ossetia (2007–2026), appointed by the government of Georgia as South Ossetia's official ruling body in opposition to secessionist movements in the region. After being driven out of the country during the Russo-Georgian War in 2008, it operated as a government in exile in opposition to the current, Russian-backed government before ultimately being abolished at the start of 2026.
- Supreme Council of the Armed Forces (2011–2012), interim government of Egypt formed following the resignation of president Hosni Mubarak during the 2011 Egyptian revolution. Dissolved following the election and inauguration of Mohamed Morsi as president.
- Interim government of Egypt (2013–2014), established following the June 2013 Egyptian protests and subsequent coup
- Congress of People's Deputies of the Russian Republic (2022–present), established in response to the Russian invasion of Ukraine, made up of former deputies of different levels and convocations, claiming to be a government in exile for Russia in opposition to Vladimir Putin.

== See also ==
- Caretaker government
- Diaspora nationalism
- Government-in-exile
- Interregnum
- Martial law
- Military junta
- Rival government
- List of territories governed by the United Nations
