= Sokołowo, Września County =

Sokołowo
- Village
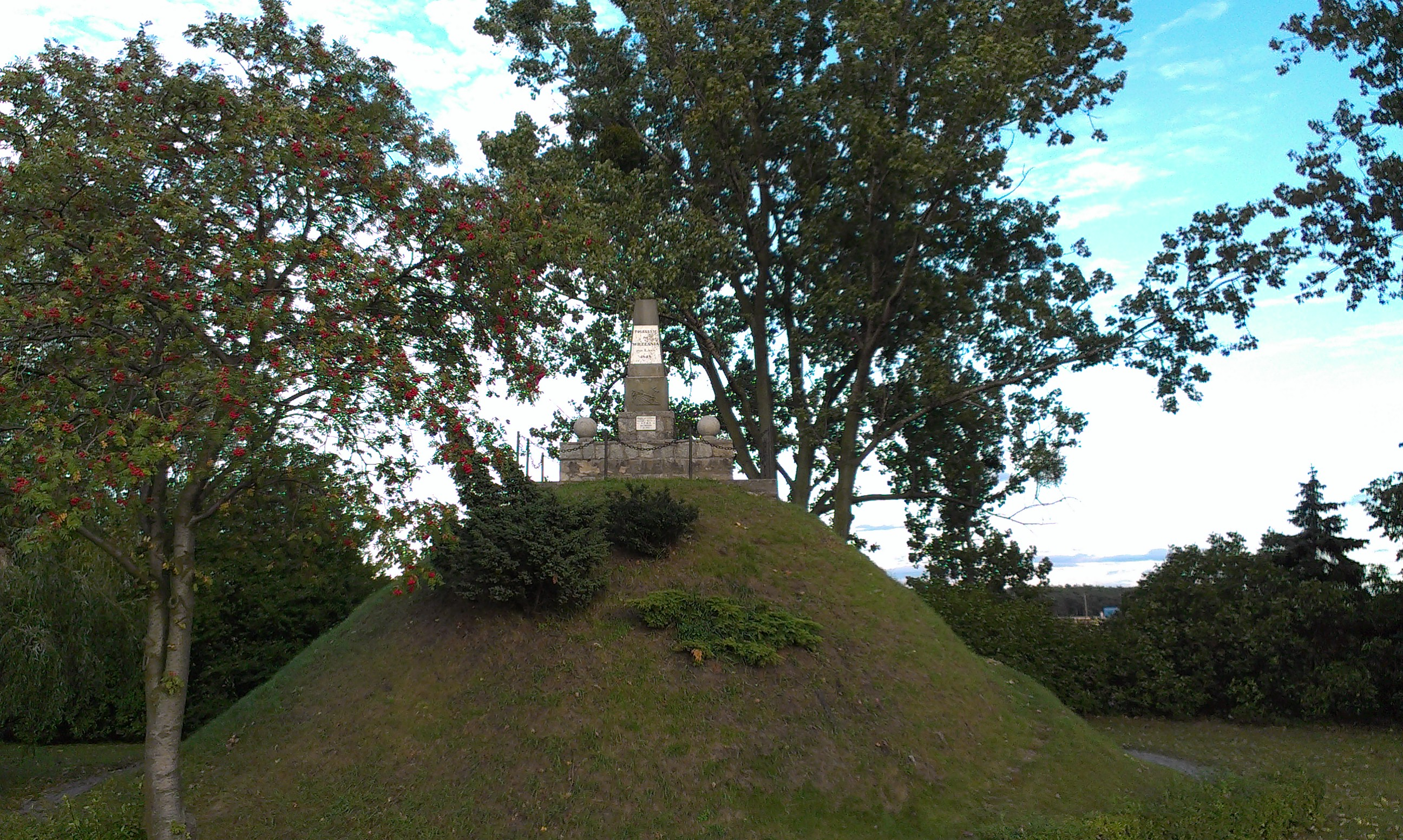
- A monument at the site of the Battle of Sokołowo of 1848

- Location within Poland
- Coordinates: 52°20′49″N 17°33′59″E
- Country: Poland
- Voivodeship: Greater Poland
- County: Września
- Gmina: Września
- Population: 1,007
- Time zone: UTC+1 (CET)
  - Summer (DST): UTC+2 (CEST)

Sokołowo [sɔkɔˈwɔvɔ] is a village in the administrative district of Gmina Września, within Września County, Greater Poland Voivodeship, in west-central Poland.

The village existed before 1523. In the past it was owned by the Polish noble Poniński family, including participant of the November Uprising of 1830–1831, Edward Poniński.

During the Greater Poland uprising, on May 2, 1848, Sokołowo was the site the Battle of Sokołowo, in which the Polish insurgents commanded by general, poet and historian Ludwik Mierosławski won against the Prussians. Poles from the nearby town of Września erected a monument at the site several months later despite Prussian rule.
