= Byczyna (disambiguation) =

Byczyna may refer to the following places in Poland:

- Byczyna in Opole Voivodeship (south Poland)
- Byczyna, Pomeranian Voivodeship (north Poland)
- Byczyna, Kuyavian-Pomeranian Voivodeship (central Poland)
- Byczyna, a district of Jaworzno
