= Altana (disambiguation) =

Altana is a German chemical company.

Altana may also refer to:

== Places ==
- Alțâna, a village in Romania
- Altana, Kuyavian-Pomeranian Voivodeship, a village in Poland

== Fictional entities ==
- Altana, a figure in Final Fantasy XI

== See also ==
- Atlanta
