= Gmina Dobre =

Gmina Dobre may refer to either of the following rural administrative districts in Poland:

- Gmina Dobre, Masovian Voivodeship
- Gmina Dobre, Kuyavian-Pomeranian Voivodeship
