= Battle of Sokołowo Monument =

Coordinates: 52°20′30″N 17°33′53″E

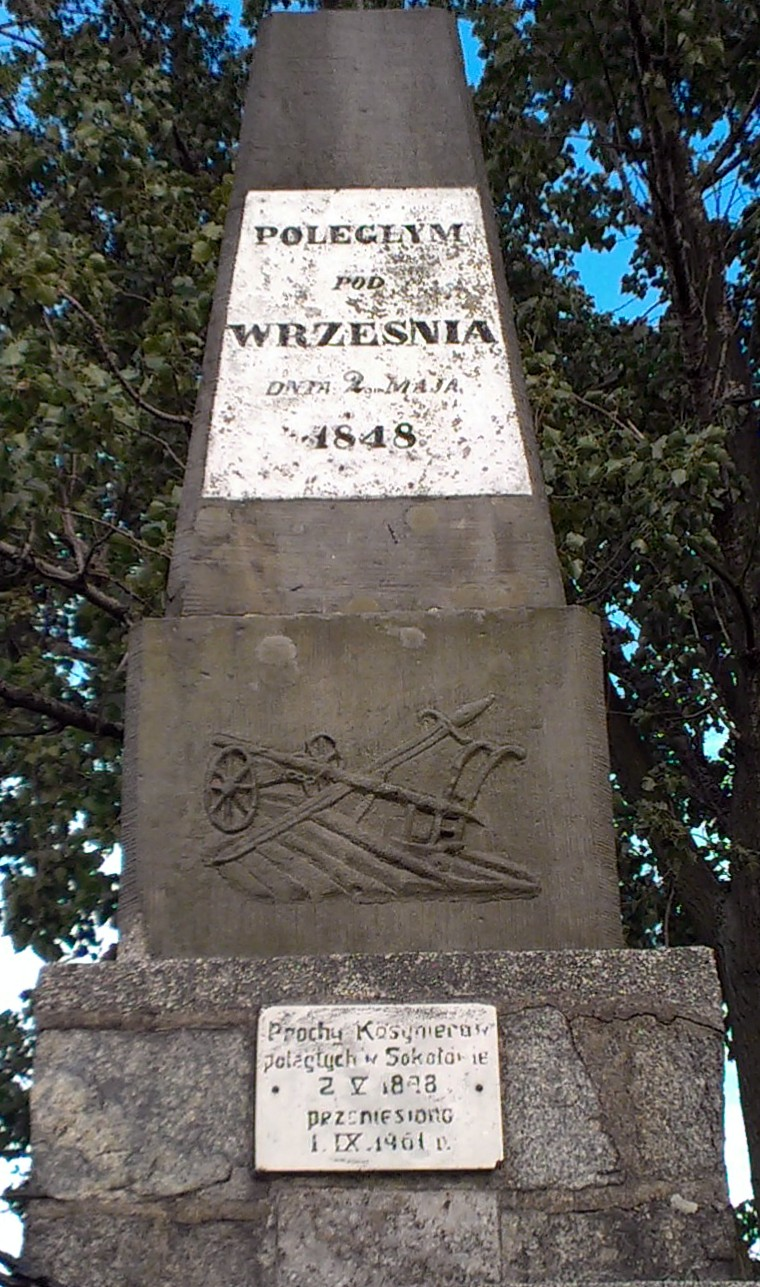
- Monument commemorating the victims of the Battle of Sokołowo on May 2, 1848
- Interactive map of Battle of Sokołowo Monument
- Location: Poland
- Type: Obelisk

Plan of the monument

The Battle of Sokołowo Monument (Polish: Pomnik bitwy pod Sokołowem) is a monument commemorating the victims of the Battle of Sokołowo on May 2, 1848 during the Greater Poland Uprising.

In the battle, the Prussian forces led by Gen. A. Hirschfeld against Polish insurgents led by Ludwik Mierosławski. During the battle, more than 300 insurgents were killed. This event also marks the Song of 1848. Cyprian Norwid was responsible for the idea for the monument.

== Location ==
The monument is in Sokołowo, Września County near trunk road 15.

== History of the monument ==
The monument was built in the fall of 1848. A dedication ceremony was held on November 23, 1848. In 1926, thanks to Count Mycielski the property was updated with stylized battle scythes. During the German occupation, the statue was destroyed by the Nazis. After the Second World War in 1945, the monument was reconstructed, and in 1961 the monument was placed on an eight-meter mound. In 1998, the monument was renovated alongside celebrations at the 150th anniversary of the Spring of Nations.

== Gallery ==
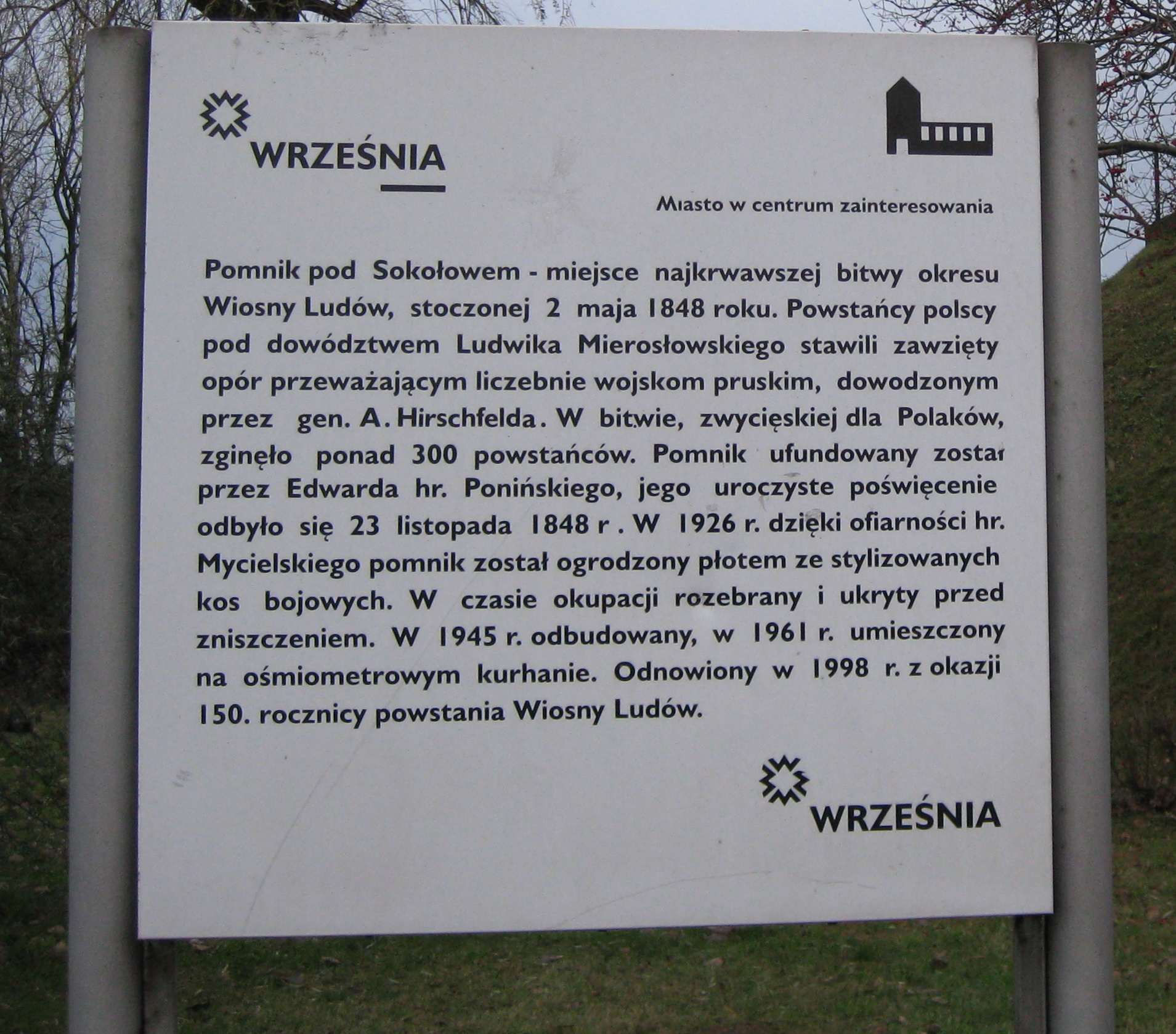
Warning sign at the monument

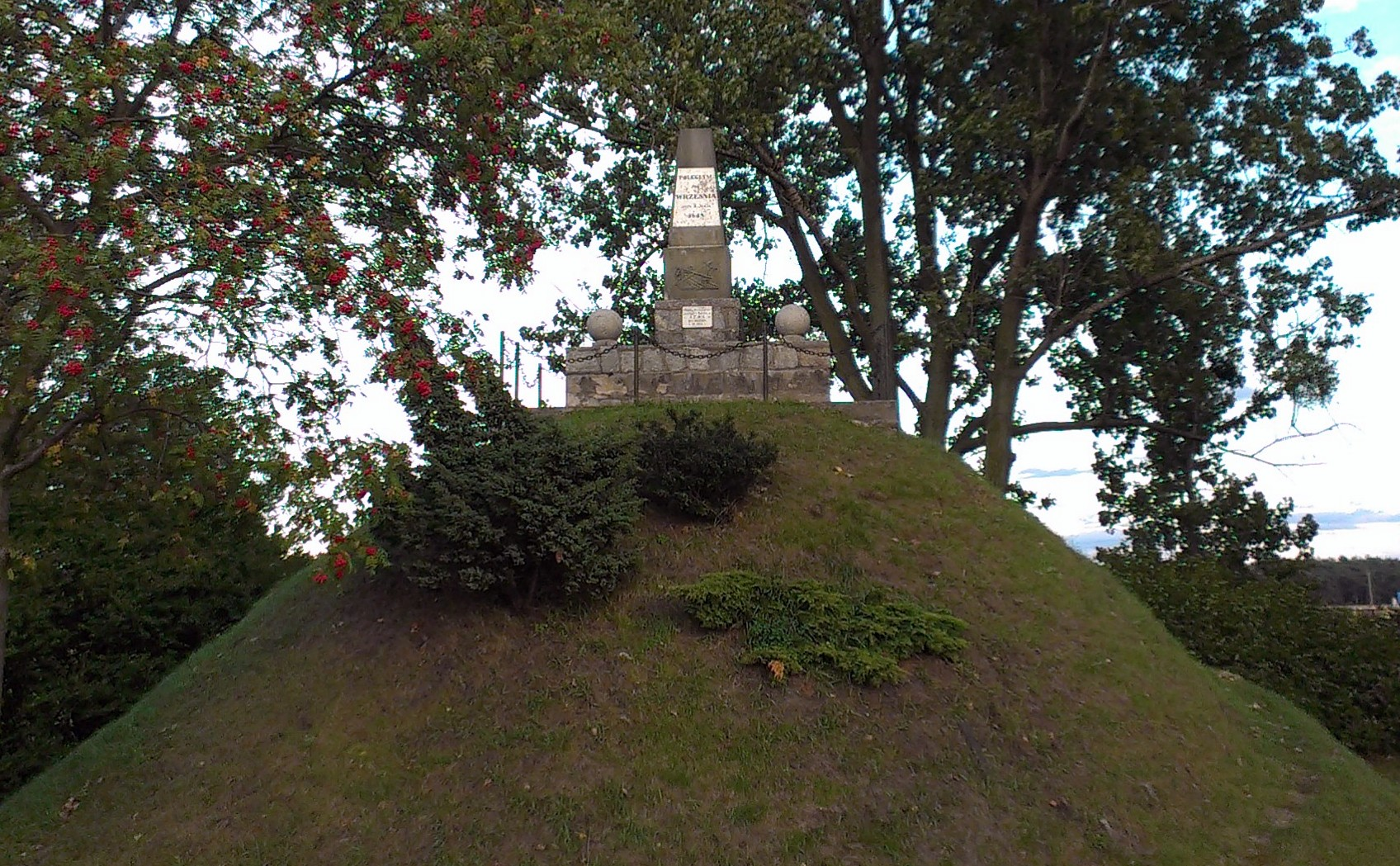
Mound

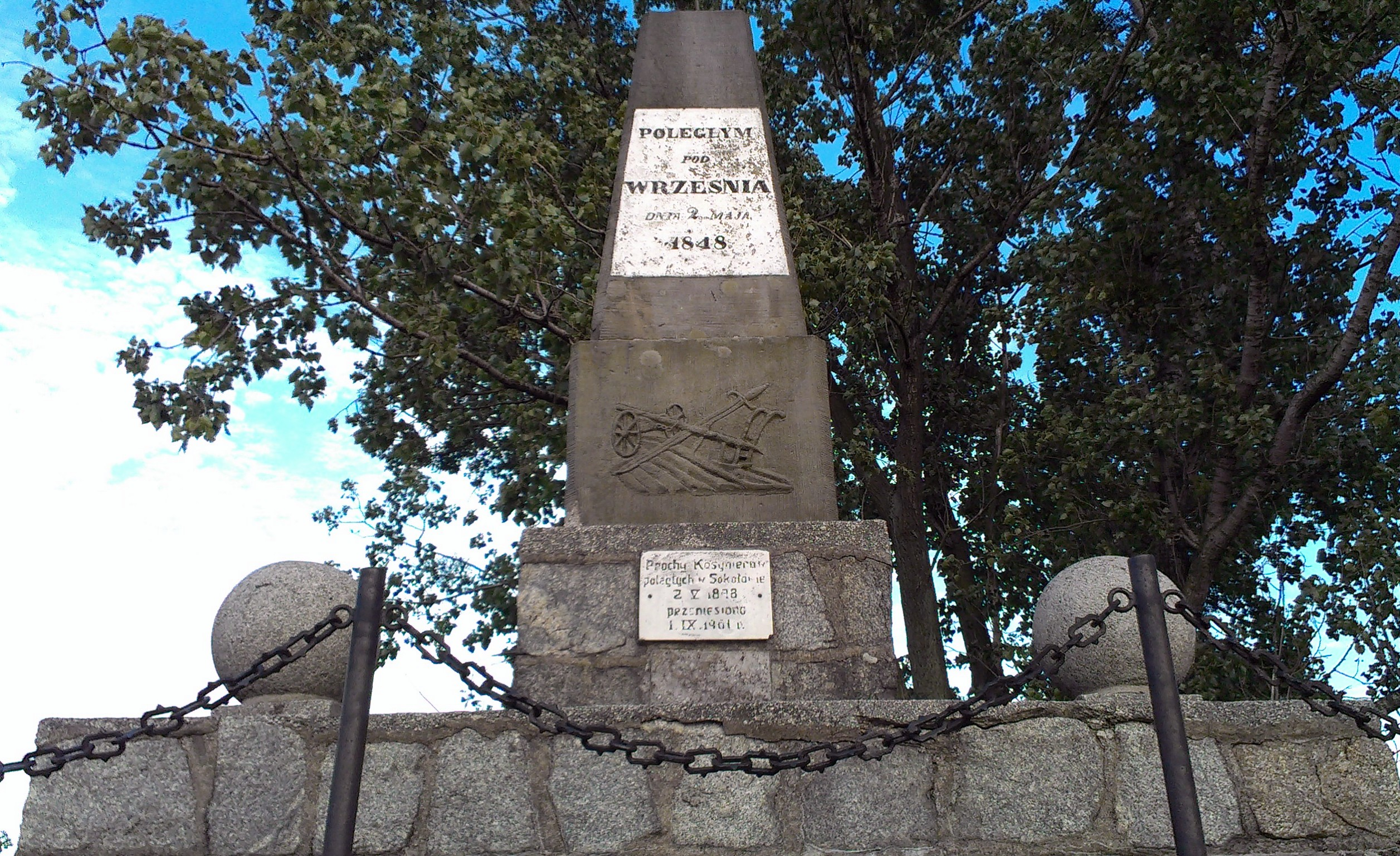
Monument

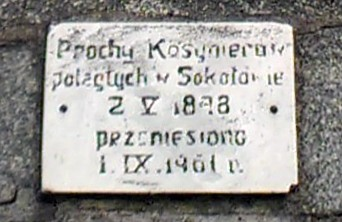
Memorial plaque

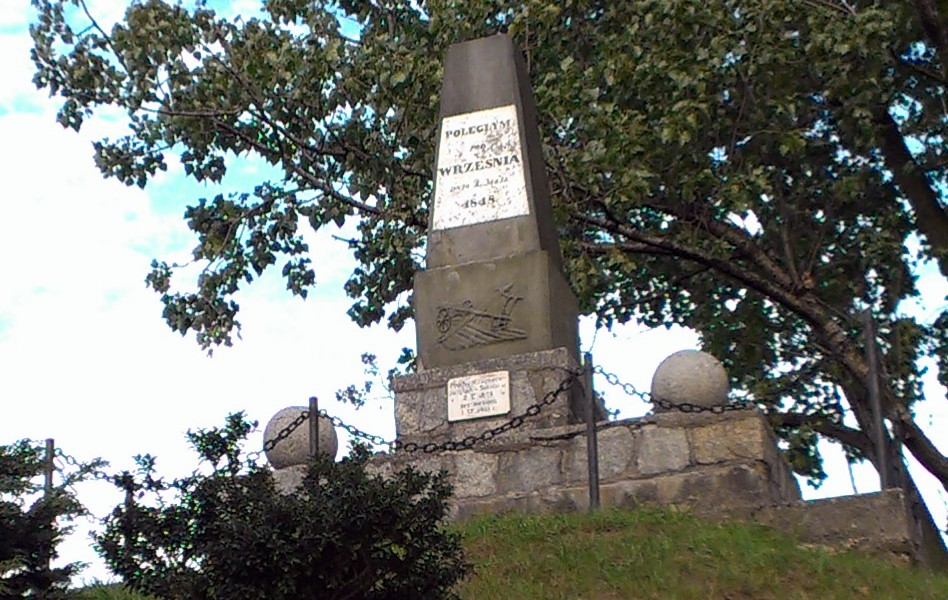
Monument
