= Dobre, Radziejów County =

Dobre
- Village
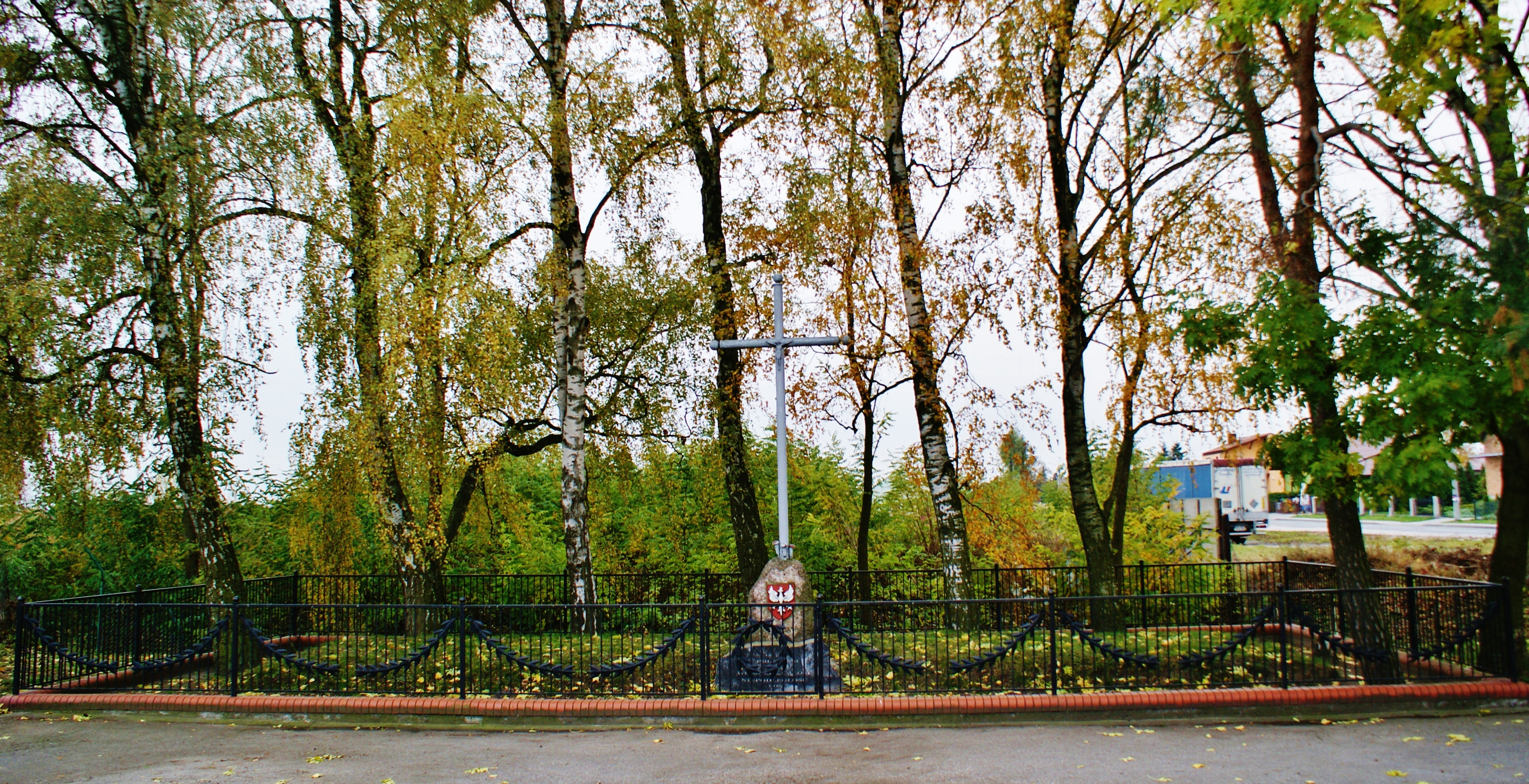
- Mass grave of Polish insurgents from 1863

- Location within Poland
- Coordinates: 52°41′N 18°33′E
- Country: Poland
- Voivodeship: Kuyavian-Pomeranian
- County: Radziejów
- Gmina: Dobre

Population
  - Total: 1,700
- Time zone: UTC+1 (CET)
  - Summer (DST): UTC+2 (CEST)
- Vehicle registration: CRA

Dobre [ˈdɔbrɛ] is a village in Radziejów County, Kuyavian-Pomeranian Voivodeship, in central Poland. It is the seat of the gmina (administrative district) called Gmina Dobre. It is located in the historic region of Kuyavia.

== History ==
In the 10th century, the area became part of the emerging Polish state under the Piast dynasty. Dobre was initially a royal village of the Kingdom of Poland, and later on, it passed into the possession of various noble families. It was administratively located in the Radziejów County in the Brześć Kujawski Voivodeship in the Greater Poland Province.

In the late 18th century, it was annexed by Prussia during the Partitions of Poland. In 1807, it was regained by Poles and included in the short-lived Duchy of Warsaw, and following its dissolution in 1815, it fell to the Russian Partition of Poland. During the January Uprising, on February 19, 1863, the Battle of Krzywosądz between Polish insurgents and Russian troops was fought nearby. Dobre is the location of one of the two mass graves of the insurgents killed in the battle with the other grave located in Krzywosądz. Following World War I, in 1918, Poland regained independence and control of the village.

During the German occupation of Poland (World War II), in 1940, the occupiers carried out expulsions of Poles, whose houses and farms were then handed over to German colonists as part of the Lebensraum policy. Expelled Poles from Dobre and other nearby villages were briefly held in a temporary transit camp in Dobre, then moved to a transit camp in Łódź, and eventually deported to the area of Biała Podlaska in the General Government in the more eastern part of German-occupied Poland.

A major factory was a sugar refinery, closed in January 2006 due to economic reasons.
