= Bodzanowo, Radziejów County =

Bodzanowo
- Village
- Location within Poland
- Coordinates: 52°42′3″N 18°38′9″E
- Country: Poland
- Voivodeship: Kuyavian-Pomeranian
- County: Radziejów
- Gmina: Dobre

Bodzanowo [bɔd͡zaˈnɔvɔ] is a village in the administrative district of Gmina Dobre, within Radziejów County, Kuyavian-Pomeranian Voivodeship, in north-central Poland.
