= Borowo, Gmina Dobre =

Borowo
- Village
- Location within Poland
- Coordinates: 52°42′12″N 18°37′29″E
- Country: Poland
- Voivodeship: Kuyavian-Pomeranian
- County: Radziejów
- Gmina: Dobre

Borowo [bɔˈrɔvɔ] is a village in the administrative district of Gmina Dobre, within Radziejów County, Kuyavian-Pomeranian Voivodeship, in north-central Poland.
