= Przysiek, Gmina Dobre =

Przysiek
- Village
- Location within Poland
- Coordinates: 52°41′N 18°36′E
- Country: Poland
- Voivodeship: Kuyavian-Pomeranian
- County: Radziejów
- Gmina: Dobre

Przysiek [ˈpʂɨɕɛk] is a village in the administrative district of Gmina Dobre, within Radziejów County, Kuyavian-Pomeranian Voivodeship, in north-central Poland.
