= Bronisław, Radziejów County =

Bronisław
- Village
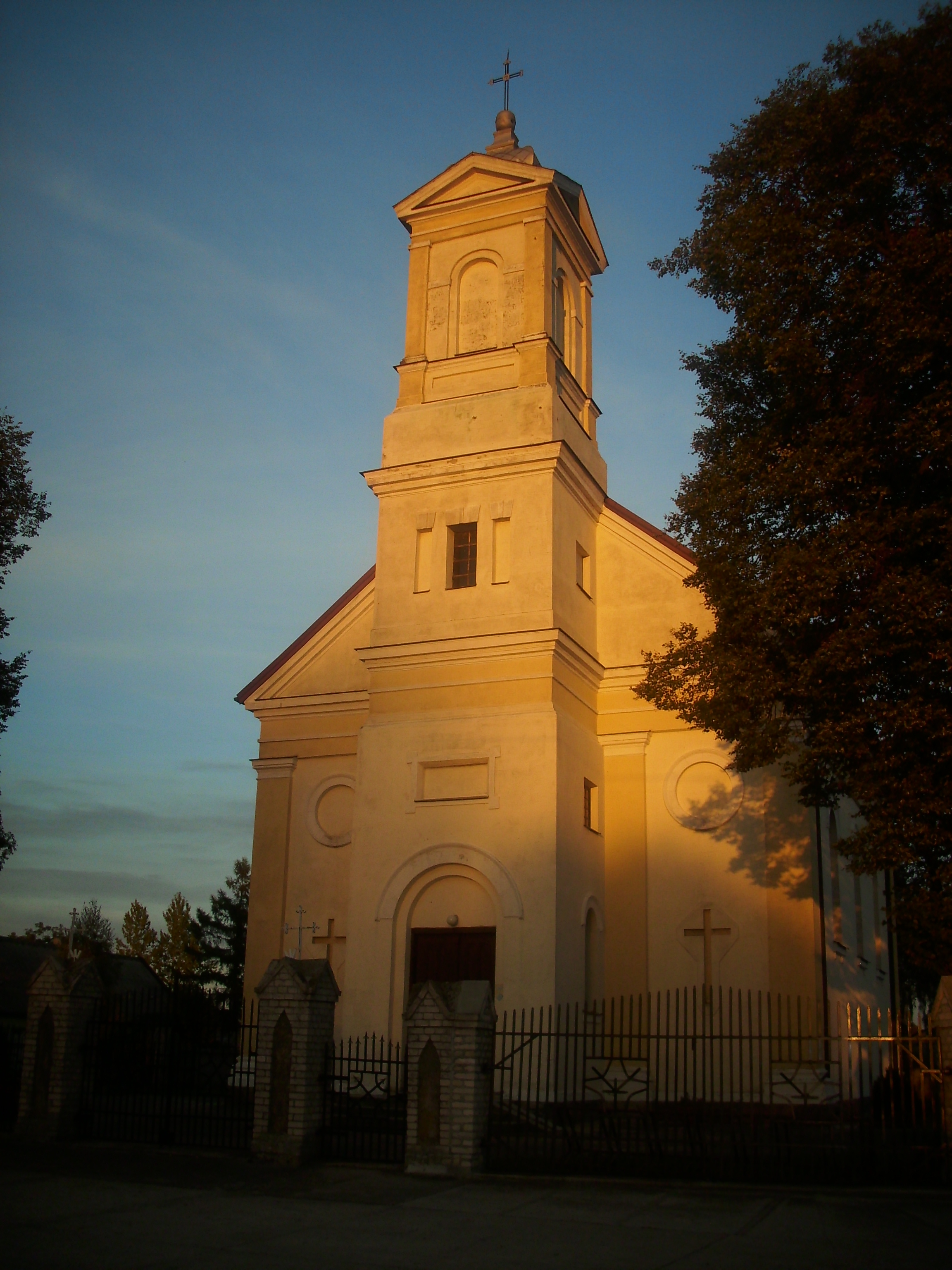
- Church in Bronisław

- Location within Poland
- Coordinates: 52°41′27″N 18°31′41″E
- Country: Poland
- Voivodeship: Kuyavian-Pomeranian
- County: Radziejów
- Gmina: Dobre

Bronisław (Polish pronunciation: [brɔˈɲiswaf]) is a village in the administrative district of Gmina Dobre, within Radziejów County, Kuyavian-Pomeranian Voivodeship, in north-central Poland.
