= Morawy, Kuyavian-Pomeranian Voivodeship =

Morawy
- Village
- Location within Poland
- Coordinates: 52°43′N 18°36′E
- Country: Poland
- Voivodeship: Kuyavian-Pomeranian
- County: Radziejów
- Gmina: Dobre

Morawy [mɔˈravɨ] is a village in the administrative district of Gmina Dobre, within Radziejów County, Kuyavian-Pomeranian Voivodeship, in north-central Poland.
