= Ludwikowo, Gmina Dobre =

Ludwikowo
- Village
- Location within Poland
- Coordinates: 52°41′4″N 18°38′46″E
- Country: Poland
- Voivodeship: Kuyavian-Pomeranian
- County: Radziejów
- Gmina: Dobre
- Population: 26

Ludwikowo [ludviˈkɔvɔ] is a village in the administrative district of Gmina Dobre, within Radziejów County, Kuyavian-Pomeranian Voivodeship, in north-central Poland.

== Statistics ==
- Population-26
- Children-5
- Houses-6 (7)
