= Koszczały =

- Village
- Location within Poland
- Coordinates: 52°41′33″N 18°32′39″E
- Country: Poland
- Voivodeship: Kuyavian-Pomeranian
- County: Radziejów
- Gmina: Dobre
- Population (approx.): 130

Koszczały [kɔʂˈt͡ʂawɨ] is a village in the administrative district of Gmina Dobre, within Radziejów County, Kuyavian-Pomeranian Voivodeship, in north-central Poland.

The village has an approximate population of 50.
