= Nowa Wieś, Radziejów County =

Nowa Wieś
- Village
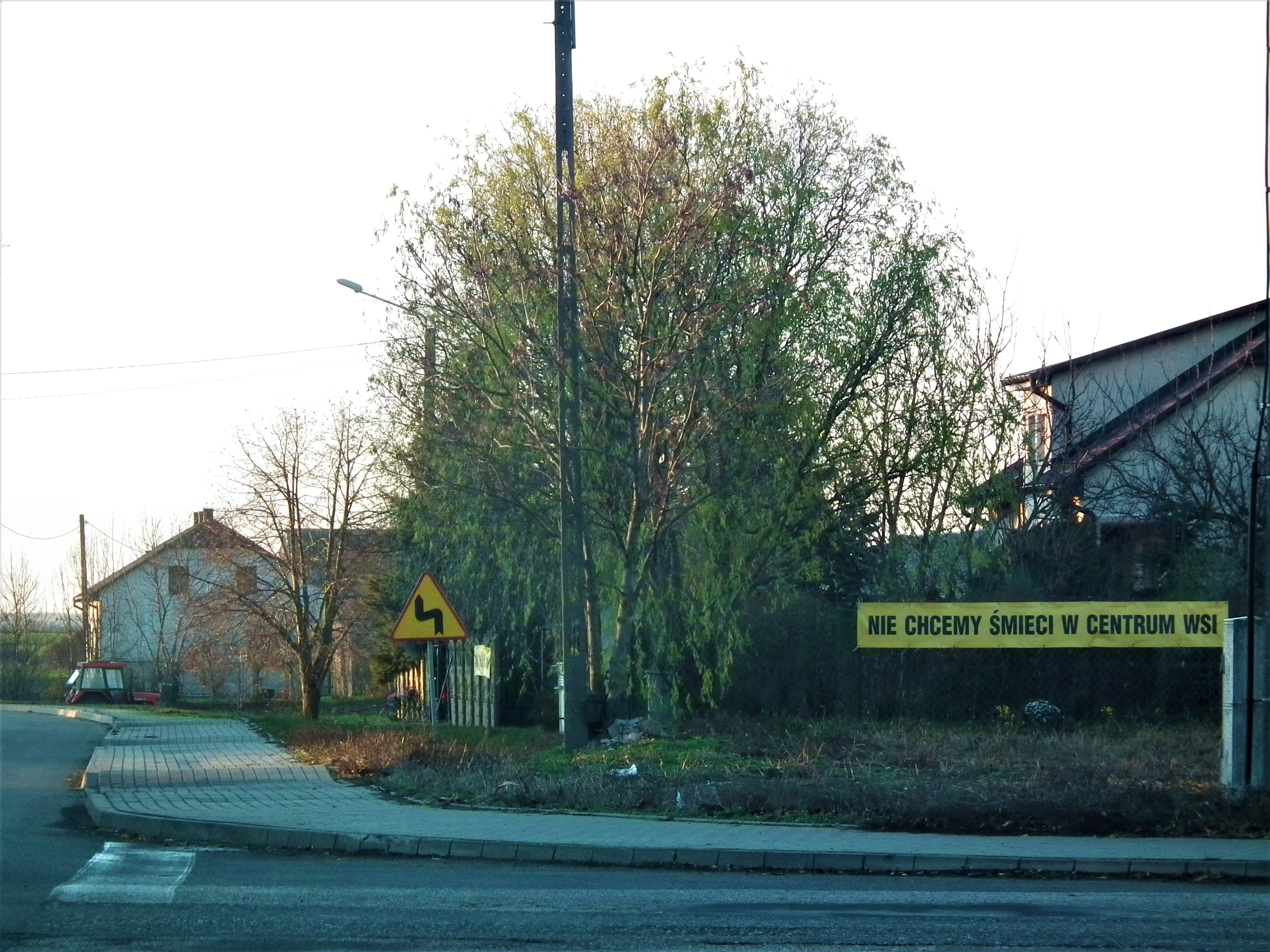
- Road sign in Nowa Wieś

- Location within Poland
- Coordinates: 52°29′19″N 18°26′18″E
- Country: Poland
- Voivodeship: Kuyavian-Pomeranian
- County: Radziejów
- Gmina: Piotrków Kujawski
- Time zone: UTC+1 (CET)
  - Summer (DST): UTC+2 (CEST)
- Vehicle registration: CRA

Nowa Wieś [ˈnɔva ˈvjɛɕ] is a village in the administrative district of Gmina Piotrków Kujawski, within Radziejów County, Kuyavian-Pomeranian Voivodeship, in central Poland.

== History ==
The area formed part of Poland, since the country's establishment in the 10th century under the Piast dynasty. In the late 18th century, the village was annexed by Prussia during the Partitions of Poland. In 1807, it was regained by Poles and included in the short-lived Duchy of Warsaw, and following the duchy's dissolution in 1815, Nowa Wieś fell to the Russian Partition of Poland. It was the site of two battles of the Polish January Uprising against Russia. The First Battle of Nowa Wieś was fought on February 21, 1863, and ended in a Russian victory. The Second Battle of Nowa Wieś took place on April 26, 1863, and ended in a Polish victory. Following World War I, in 1918, Poland regained independence and control of the village.
