= Kłonowo =

- Village
- Location within Poland
- Coordinates: 52°38′53″N 18°36′10″E
- Country: Poland
- Voivodeship: Kuyavian-Pomeranian
- County: Radziejów
- Gmina: Dobre

Kłonowo (Polish pronunciation: [kwɔˈnɔvɔ]) is a village in the administrative district of Gmina Dobre, within Radziejów County, Kuyavian-Pomeranian Voivodeship, in north-central Poland.
