= Dobre-Kolonia =

- Village
- Location within Poland
- Coordinates: 52°40′25″N 18°32′30″E
- Country: Poland
- Voivodeship: Kuyavian-Pomeranian
- County: Radziejów
- Gmina: Dobre

Dobre-Kolonia [ˈdɔbrɛ kɔˈlɔɲa] is a village in the administrative district of Gmina Dobre, within Radziejów County, Kuyavian-Pomeranian Voivodeship, in north-central Poland.
