= Byczyna-Kolonia =

- Village
- Location within Poland
- Coordinates: 52°40′26″N 18°37′4″E
- Country: Poland
- Voivodeship: Kuyavian-Pomeranian
- County: Radziejów
- Gmina: Dobre

Byczyna-Kolonia [bɨˈt͡ʂɨna kɔˈlɔɲa] is a village in the administrative district of Gmina Dobre, within Radziejów County, Kuyavian-Pomeranian Voivodeship, in north-central Poland.
