= Gmina Dobre, Kuyavian-Pomeranian Voivodeship =

Gmina Dobre Dobre Commune
- Gmina
- Coat of arms
- Interactive map of Gmina Dobre
- Coordinates (Dobre): 52°41′N 18°33′E
- Country: Poland
- Voivodeship: Kuyavian-Pomeranian
- County: Radziejów
- Seat: Dobre

Area
  - Total: 70.77 km^{2} (27.32 sq mi)

Population (2006)
  - Total: 5,505
  - Density: 77.79/km^{2} (201.5/sq mi)
- Time zone: UTC+1 (CET)
  - Summer (DST): UTC+2 (CEST)
- Vehicle registration: CRA
- Website: http://www.ugdobre.pl/

Gmina Dobre is a rural gmina (administrative district) in Radziejów County, Kuyavian-Pomeranian Voivodeship, in central Poland. Its seat is the village of Dobre, which lies approximately 6 kilometres (4 mi) north of Radziejów and 40 km (25 mi) south of Toruń.

The gmina covers an area of 70.77 square kilometres (27.3 sq mi), and as of 2006 its total population is 5,505.

== Villages ==
Gmina Dobre contains the villages and settlements of Altana, Bodzanowo, Bodzanowo Drugie, Borowo, Bronisław, Byczyna, Byczyna-Kolonia, Czołpin, Dęby, Dobre, Dobre-Kolonia, Dobre-Wieś, Kłonowo, Koszczały, Krzywosądz, Ludwikowo, Morawy, Narkowo, Przysiek, Smarglin, Szczeblotowo and Ułomie.

== Neighbouring gminas ==
Gmina Dobre is bordered by the gminas of Dąbrowa Biskupia, Kruszwica, Osięciny, Radziejów and Zakrzewo.
