= Byczyna, Kuyavian-Pomeranian Voivodeship =

Byczyna
- Village

- Location within Poland
- Coordinates: 52°39′48″N 18°37′7″E
- Country: Poland
- Voivodeship: Kuyavian-Pomeranian
- County: Radziejów
- Gmina: Dobre
- Time zone: UTC+1 (CET)
  - Summer (DST): UTC+2 (CEST)
- Vehicle registration: CRA

Byczyna [bɨˈt͡ʂɨna] is a village in the administrative district of Gmina Dobre, within Radziejów County, Kuyavian-Pomeranian Voivodeship, in central Poland.
