= Altana, Kuyavian-Pomeranian Voivodeship =

Altana
- Village
- Location within Poland
- Coordinates: 52°42′19″N 18°36′36″E
- Country: Poland
- Voivodeship: Kuyavian-Pomeranian
- County: Radziejów
- Gmina: Dobre
- Population: 70

Altana [alˈtana] is a village in the administrative district of Gmina Dobre, within Radziejów County, Kuyavian-Pomeranian Voivodeship, in north-central Poland.
