= Krzywosądz =

- Village
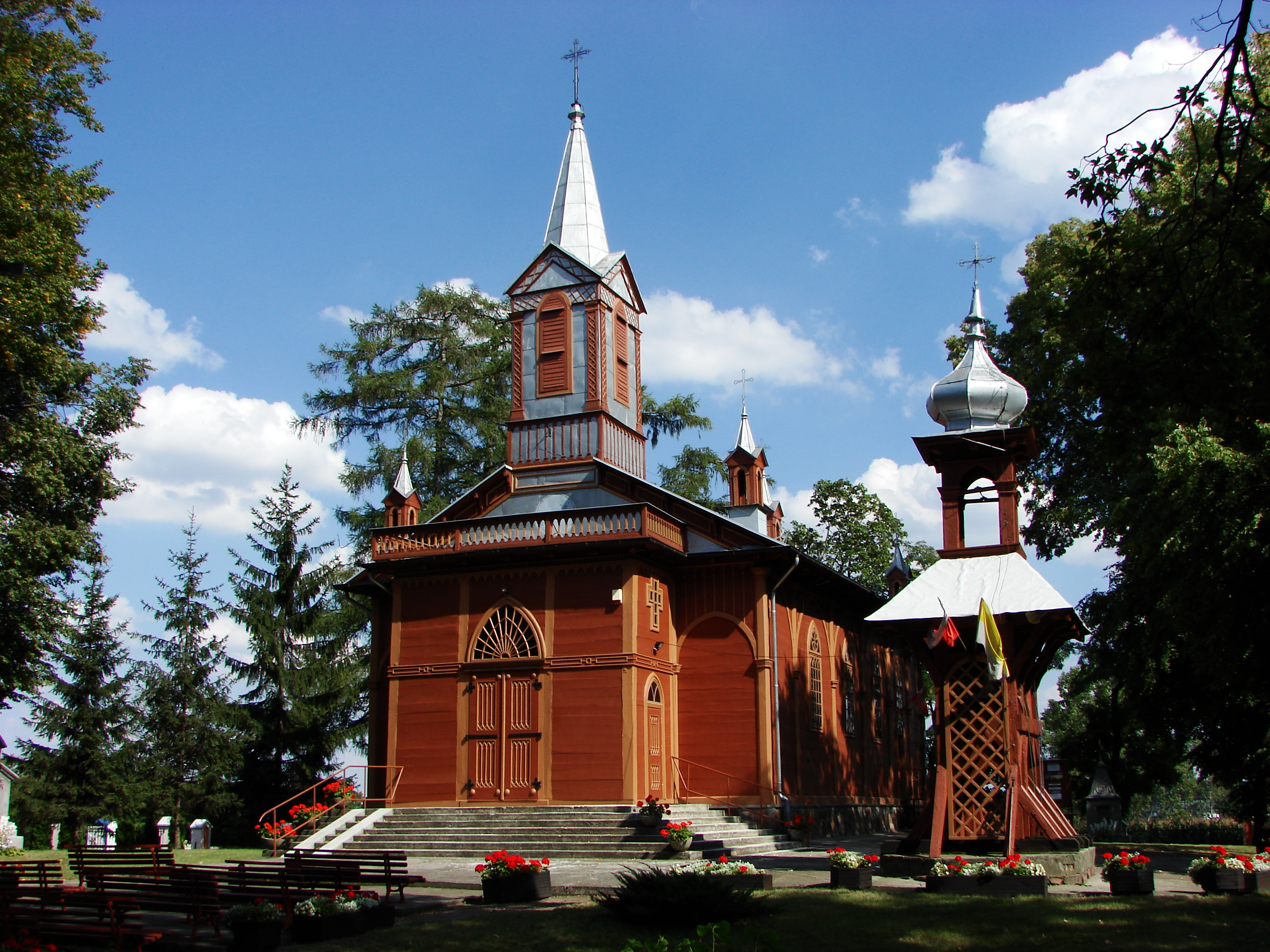
- Assumption of Virgin Mary Church in Krzywosądz

- Location within Poland
- Coordinates: 52°42′13″N 18°35′08″E
- Country: Poland
- Voivodeship: Kuyavian-Pomeranian
- County: Radziejów
- Gmina: Dobre
- Time zone: UTC+1 (CET)
  - Summer (DST): UTC+2 (CEST)
- Vehicle registration: CRA

Krzywosądz [kʂɨˈvɔsɔnt͡s] is a village in the administrative district of Gmina Dobre, within Radziejów County, Kuyavian-Pomeranian Voivodeship, in north-central Poland. It is located in the historic region of Kuyavia.

== History ==
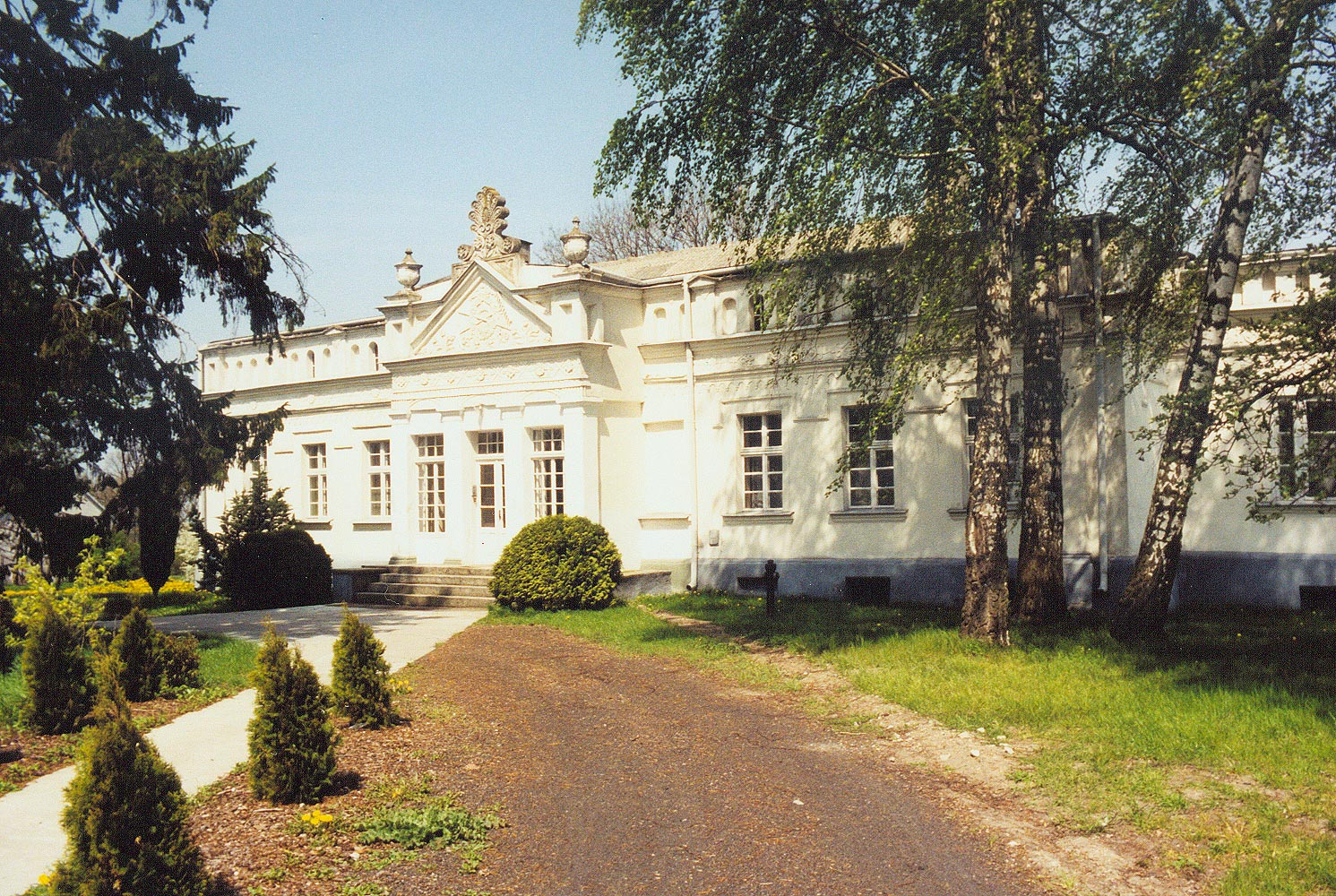
Old manor house of the Modliński family

In the 10th century, the area became part of the emerging Polish state under the Piast dynasty. In the Middle Ages, it was a private village of the Krzywosąd noble family of Niesobia coat of arms. By the 16th century, it passed to the Zakrzewski family, and later to the Niemojewski and Modliński families. It was administratively located in the Radziejów County in the Brześć Kujawski Voivodeship in the Greater Poland Province.

In the late 18th century, it was annexed by Prussia during the Partitions of Poland. In 1807, it was regained by Poles and included in the short-lived Duchy of Warsaw, and following its dissolution in 1815, it fell to the Russian Partition of Poland. During the January Uprising, on February 19, 1863, it was the site of the Battle of Krzywosądz between Polish insurgents and Russian troops. In the late 19th century, the village had a population of 290, entirely Catholic by confession. Following World War I, in 1918, Poland regained independence and control of the village.

During the German occupation of Poland (World War II), Krzywosądz was one of the sites of executions of Poles, carried out by the Germans in 1939 as part of the Intelligenzaktion. In 1940, the occupiers expelled the entire population of the village, which was then placed in a transit camp in Łódź, and afterwards deported to the General Government in the more eastern part of German-occupied Poland, while the houses and farms of expelled Poles were handed over to German colonists as part of the Lebensraum policy.
