= Second Battle of Nowa Wieś =

The Second Battle of Nowa Wies was a skirmish of the January Uprising in the former Polish-Lithuanian Commonwealth (present-day Poland, Lithuania, Belarus, Latvia, parts of Ukraine, and western Russia) against the Russian Empire on 26 April 1863. It took place near the village of Nowa Wies, which at that time belonged to Russian-controlled Congress Poland. A thousand Polish insurgents under Frenchman Leon Young de Blankenheim were victorious over some seven hundred soldiers of the Imperial Russian Army.

In mid-April 1863, Young de Blankenheim's unit entered Congress Poland from the Prussian Province of Posen. In the forests near the village of Kazimierz, it joined with two other insurgent groups. The Polish troops numbered some thousand men, most of whom were poorly armed, with a number of kosynierzy—soldiers (often peasants) armed with war scythes. Near Nowa Wies, a Russian unit of seven hundred was attacked by the Poles. After a bloody skirmish, the Russians retreated, with some soldiers crossing the Prussian border.

== Sources ==
- Stefan Kieniewicz: Powstanie styczniowe. Warszawa: Państwowe Wydawnictwo Naukowe, 1983. ISBN 83-01-03652-4.
