= Battle of Nowa Wieś (1831) =

1831 battle of the November Uprising

- Part of the November Uprising
Date	19 February 1831
Location	Nowa Wieś
Result	Polish victory

Belligerents
Congress Poland	(Russia) Russian Empire

Commanders and leaders
Józef Dwernicki	Cyprian Kreutz

Casualties and losses
	200

The Battle of Nowa Wieś (Polish: Bitwa pod Nową Wsią; Russian: Сражение под Новой Весью) was fought on 19 February 1831 between an army of Polish rebels under Jozef Dwernicki and a Russian army under Cyprian Kreutz. The Polish rebels were victorious.
