= Battle of Krzywosądz =

- Part of the January Uprising
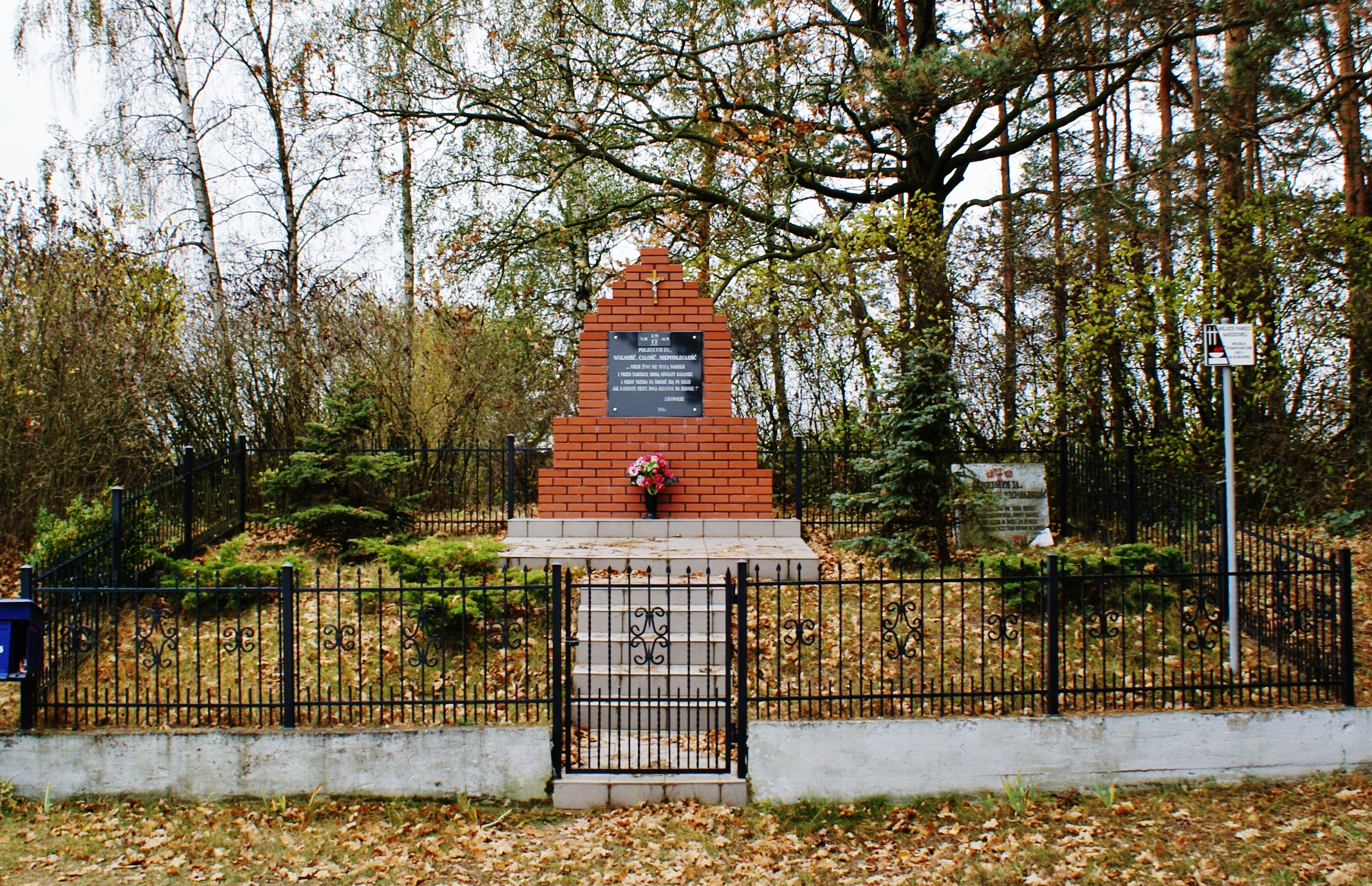
- Mass grave of Polish insurgents fallen in the battle in Krzywosądz
Date	19 February 1863
Location	Krzywosądz 52°42′13″N 18°35′08″E
Result	Russian victory

Belligerents
(Poland) Polish insurgents	Russian Empire

Commanders and leaders
Ludwik Mierosławski	Yuri Schilder-Schuldner

Strength
500	1,000
- Location within Poland

The Battle of Krzywosądz was one of the battles of the January Uprising. It took place in the village of Krzywosądz, Congress Poland, on 19 February 1863, when a poorly armed party of 500 Polish insurgents, under Ludwik Mierosławski, clashed with a 1,000 strong unit of the Imperial Russian Army.

On the night of 17-18 February 1863, an Imperial Russian Army unit, stationed in Włocławek was alarmed by the news that Polish insurgents concentrated near the village of Niszczewy in the region of Kuyavia. The Russians, commanded by Colonel Yuri Schilder-Schuldner, immediately marched to Służewo, where they joined Russian border guards. Altogether, their forces had some 1,000 men, with a few cannons.

Colonel Schilder-Schuldner, without wasting time, decided to attack the Poles, who were still in the process of concentrating. After a skirmish that lasted several hours, Ludwik Mierosławski ordered the insurgents to retreat. The battle ended in a Russian victory, and the dead insurgents were buried in Krzywosądz and the nearby village of Dobre. Among those killed were Jan Wasiłowski (a student of Liege Technical University and brother of Maria Konopnicka), and Stanisław Gay – the son of architect Jan Jakub Gay.

After the battle, Mierosławski with his men headed towards Radziejów, where he was joined with a unit of Kazimierz Mielecki. On 21 February Mierosławski's forces lost another battle at Nowa Wieś, and the Polish leader decided to give up his post, going to Paris.

== Sources ==
- Stefan Kieniewicz: Powstanie styczniowe. Warszawa: Państwowe Wydawnictwo Naukowe, 1983. ISBN 83-01-03652-4.
