= First Battle of Nowa Wieś =

Russian battle

- Part of the January Uprising
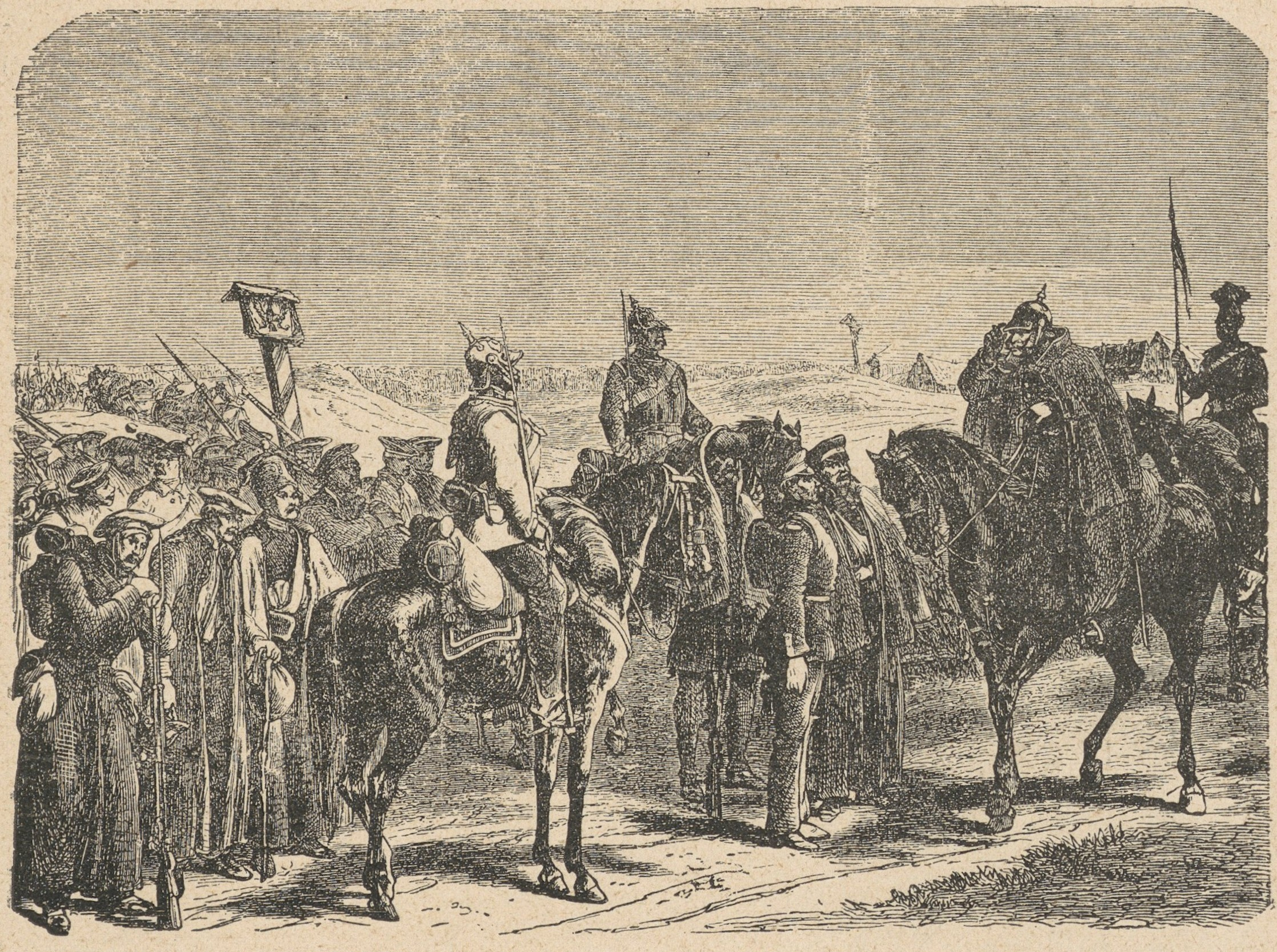
- The expulsion of the Poles across the Prussian border after the first battle at Nowa Wieś (c. 1863)
Date	21 February 1863
Location	Nowa Wies, Kuyavian-Pomeranian Voivodeship, Poland
Result	Russian victory

Belligerents
(Poland) Polish Insurgents	Russian Empire

Commanders and leaders
General Ludwik Mieroslawski	Lieutenant Colonel Jurij Ivanovich Szylder-Szuldner

Strength
c. 600 men	c. 500 men

The First Battle of Nowa Wies took place on 21 February 1863 near the village of Nowa Wies, Russian-controlled Congress Poland. It was one of many skirmishes of the January Uprising, the anti-Russian rebellion of Poles. A group of some 600 Polish insurgents under Ludwik Mieroslawski clashed with 500 soldiers of the Imperial Russian Army. The battle ended in Russian victory.

After the lost Battle of Krzywosadz (19 February), General Ludwik Mieroslawski retreated to Nowa Wies, where he camped with his soldiers. In the evening of 21 February, Polish insurgents were taken by surprise, when Russian forces surrounded them, and attacked. Mieroslawski's unit was completely destroyed, also due to internal arguments between different factions in Polish camp. Most insurgents retreated towards the nearby Prussian border, and Mieroslawski himself resigned from his post as leader of the uprising.

== Sources ==
- Stefan Kieniewicz: Powstanie styczniowe. Warszawa: Państwowe Wydawnictwo Naukowe, 1983. ISBN 83-01-03652-4.
