= Ludwik Mierosławski =

Polish general (1814–1878)

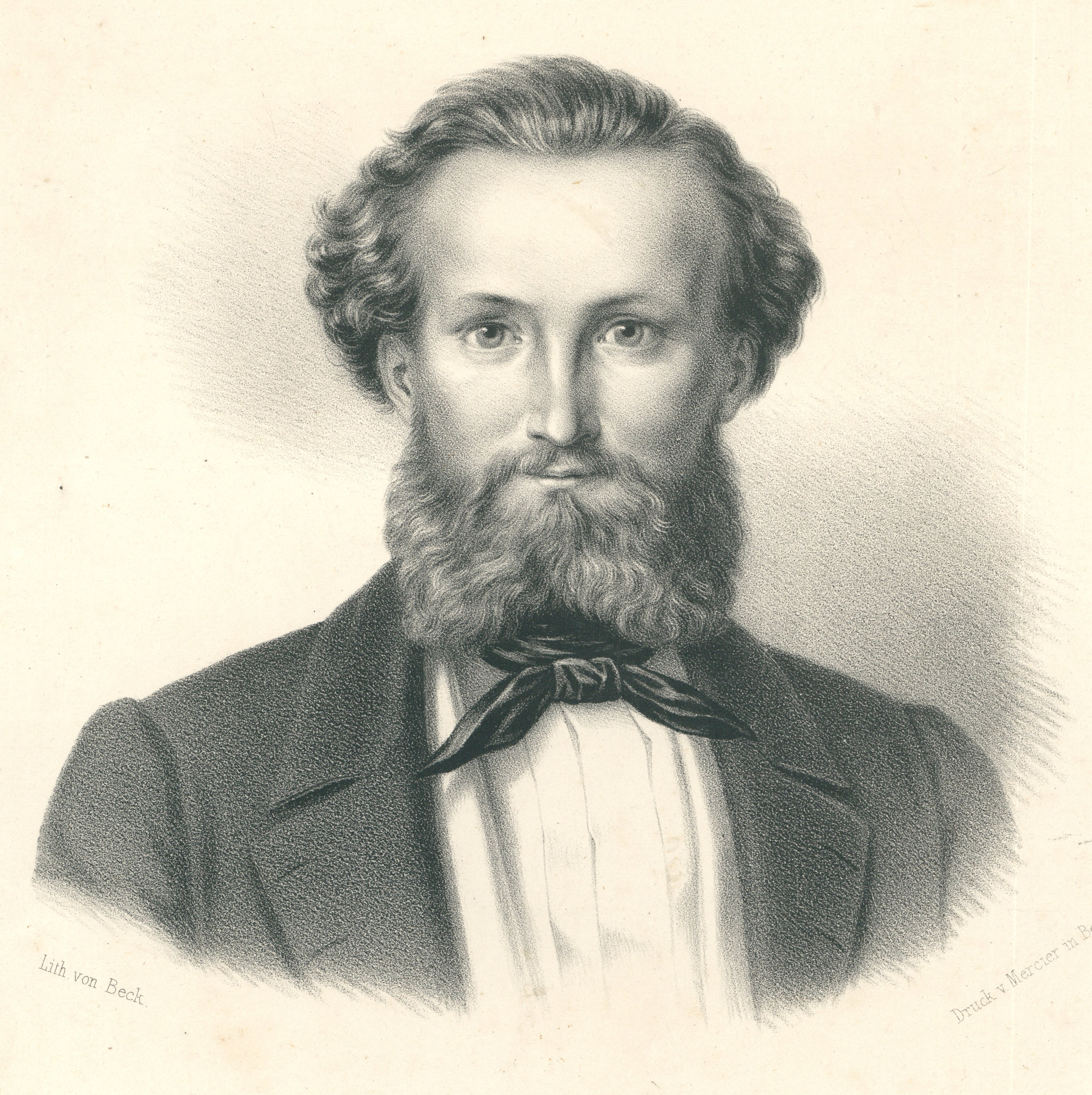
- Portrait of Mierosławski, c. 1850
- Born: Pierre Louis Adam Mierosławski; January 17, 1814; Nemours, Seine-et-Marne, First French Empire
- Died: November 22, 1878 (aged 64); Paris, Seine-et-Oise, French Third Republic
- Other name: L. Notté de Vaupleux
- Notable work: Histoire de la revolution de Pologne
- Political party: TDP
- Movement: Young Poland
- Parents: Adam Kasper Mierosławski (father); Camille Notté de Vaupleux (mother)
- Family: Leszczyc

Ludwik Adam Mierosławski (Polish pronunciation: [ˈludvik mjɛrɔˈswafskʲi]; January 17, 1814 – November 22, 1878) was a Polish general, writer, poet, historian and political activist. Mierosławski took part in the November uprising of the 1830s, and after its failure he emigrated to France, where he taught Slavic history and military theory. Chosen as a commander for the Greater Poland Uprising of 1846, he was taken prisoner early but amnestied during the Spring of Nations. In 1848 and 1849 he fought for the insurgents in Baden and in the Electorate of the Palatinate. Afterwards he returned to France; he also had contacts with Italian activists like Giuseppe Garibaldi. He also took part in the January uprising in the 1860s, as the first of four dictators of the Uprising.

== Biography ==
Mierosławski was born on 17 January 1814 in Nemours, France, as a son of Colonel Adam Kasper Mierosławski (1785–1837), an officer of the Duchy of Warsaw and Polish Legions of the Napoleonic period) and aide to French general Louis Nicolas Davout, who became Mierosławski's godfather. His mother was of French origin, Camille Notté de Vaupleux. His brother was Adam Mierosławski, an engineer and naval captain.

His family moved to the Congress Poland in 1820. Mierosławski attended schools in Łomża and Kalisz, and at the age of 15 he became a podchorąży (officer cadet) in the 5th Infantry Pułk.

During the November uprising, when Poles rose against the Russian forces in Congress Poland, he was a lieutenant serving under General Samuel Różycki. With him he fought and eventually retreated to Galicia, and later emigrated to France, where he became an active member of various Polish emigree organizations, particularly Polish Democratic Society and carbonari Young Poland.

In 1839–1840 he gave lectures on the history of Slavic people in French Historical Institute in Paris; he was also considered by many among the Polish emigrants as a knowledgeable tactician and military strategist after the publication of a history of the November Uprising in Poland, Histoire de la revolution de Pologne (Paris, 1836–38). He also published several poems, but they were not considered very significant.

He was chosen as the leader of Greater Poland Uprising of 1846, but the leaders of the Polish Wielkopolska (Greater Poland) underground, including Mierosławski, were arrested by Prussian authorities. He was sentenced to death in December 1847 but was amnestied by Frederick William IV of Prussia during the Spring of Nations in March 1848.

In the next few years, he would act as the commander of the Greater Poland Uprising of 1848, chief of staff of the revolutionary Italian army [It] in Palermo (Sicily) fighting against Bourbons (December 1848 – April 1849) and then commander of German insurgent units in Baden and in the Electorate of the Palatinate during the revolutions of 1848 in the German states. Eventually after most of the insurgent forces were defeated, he returned to Paris in 1849.

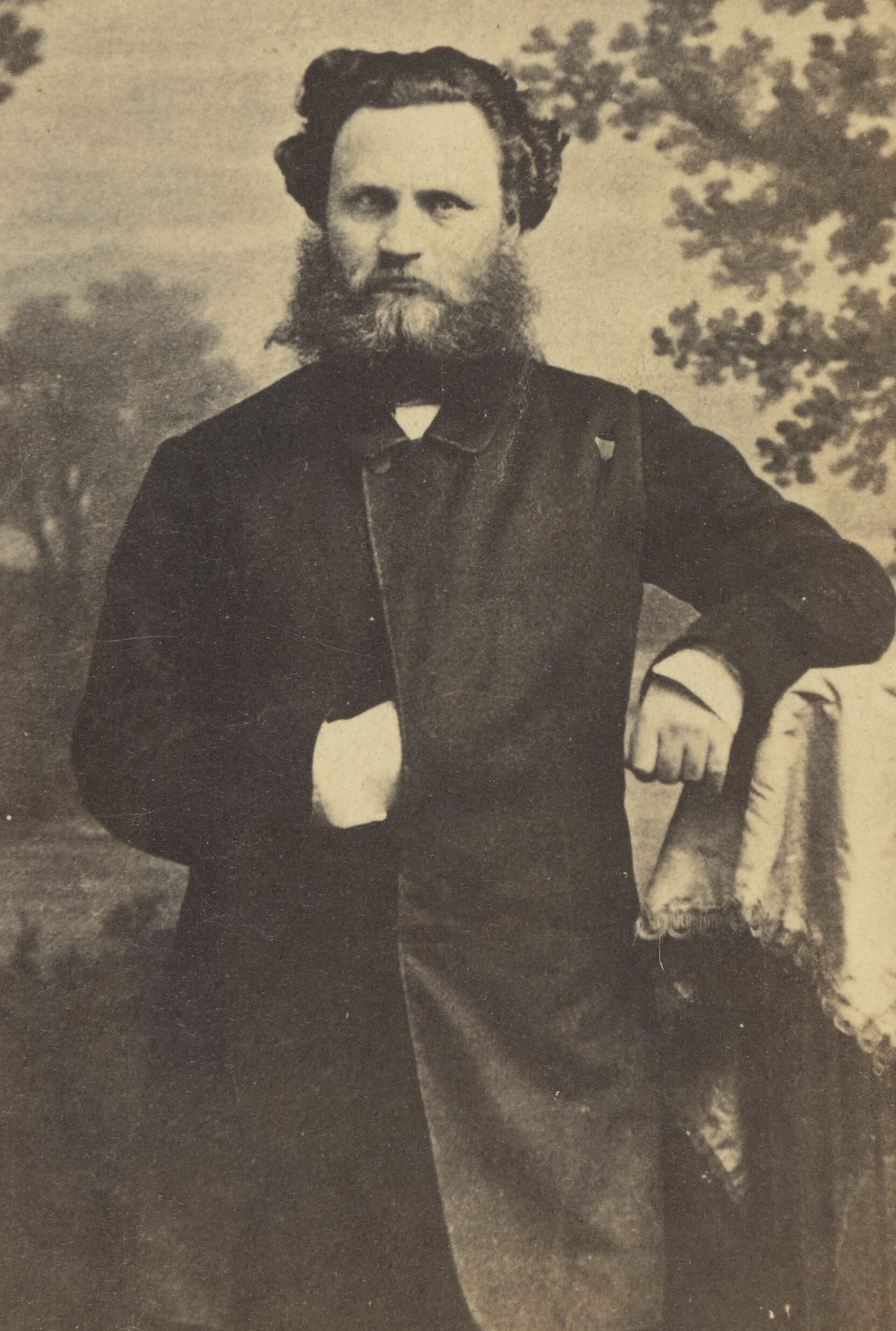
Portrait of Mierosławski, c. 1863

He vocally opposed the peaceful positivist movement, and supported the idea of another uprising in Poland. In 1860 Giuseppe Garibaldi nominated him for the commander of the International Legion in the Expedition of the Thousand which brought him back to Palermo.

In 1861 Mierosławski became a commander of Polish-Italian military school in Genoa. In 1863 he returned to Poland to join the January uprising, where he became the first dictator of the Uprising. Eventually after suffering two defeats (battle of Krzywosądz and battle of Nowa Wieś), and political conflict with Marian Langiewicz, Mierosławski resigned as the dictator and returned to Paris. He would be a vocal critic of the preparation and organization of the January Uprising. He continued to take part in politics of Polish emigrants, but he lost popularity.

After the changed political climate of Franco-Prussian War, due to his age as well as significant opposition and criticism from other emigree leaders, he retired from any active engagement in politics. He died on 22 November 1878 in Paris.

== Works ==
- La tache de Caïn (1841, an autobiography published under his mother's name as L. Notté de Vaupleux)
- poems (various, particularly from the 1830s to 1840s)
- Rozbiór krytyczny kampanii 1831 roku (Critical deconstruction of the campaign of 1831) – his most well known work, a military theory analysis of the November Uprising

He has also written other works of military nature, and published a diary in the 1860s.

== See also ==
- For our freedom and yours
