= Piaski =

Piaski (meaning "sands" in Polish) may refer to:

== Greater Poland Voivodeship ==
- Piaski, Gniezno County
- Piaski, Gostyń County
- Piaski, Kępno County
- Piaski, Konin County
- Piaski, Krotoszyn County
- Piaski, Nowy Tomyśl County
- Piaski, Rawicz County

== Kuyavian-Pomeranian Voivodeship ==
- Piaski, Grudziądz County
- Piaski, Świecie County
- Piaski, Toruń
- Piaski, Włocławek County

== Łódź Voivodeship ==
- Piaski, Gmina Bolesławiec
- Piaski, Gmina Grabów
- Piaski, Gmina Kleszczów
- Piaski, Gmina Konopnica
- Piaski, Gmina Lututów
- Piaski, Gmina Świnice Warckie
- Piaski, Gmina Szadek
- Piaski, Gmina Wieluń
- Piaski, Łowicz County
- Piaski, Piotrków County
- Piaski, Radomsko County
- Piaski, Gmina Zduńska Wola

== Lublin Voivodeship ==
- Piaski, Łuków County
- Piaski, Świdnik County
- Piaski, Włodawa County

== Masovian Voivodeship ==
- Piaski, Garwolin County
- Piaski, Piaseczno County
- Piaski, Płock County
- Piaski, Gmina Jedlińsk
- Piaski, Sierpc County
- Piaski, Warsaw
- Piaski, Wołomin County

== Podlaskie Voivodeship ==
- Piaski, Białystok, a district of the city of Białystok
- Piaski, Białystok County
- Piaski, Hajnówka County

== Świętokrzyskie Voivodeship ==
- Piaski, Jędrzejów County
- Piaski, Kielce County
- Piaski, Końskie County

== Warmian-Masurian Voivodeship ==
- Piaski, Ełk County
- Piaski, Iława County
- Piaski, Pisz County

== West Pomeranian Voivodeship ==
- Piaski, Łobez County
- Piaski, Szczecinek County

== Other regions ==
- Piaski, Lesser Poland Voivodeship
- Piaski, Lubusz Voivodeship
- Piaski, Opole Voivodeship
- Piaski, Pomeranian Voivodeship
- Piaski, colloquial name of Nowa Karczma, Krynica Morska in Pomeranian Voivodeship
- Piaski, Częstochowa County in Silesian Voivodeship
- Piaski, Subcarpathian Voivodeship

== See also ==
- Franki-Piaski
- Kolonia Piaski
- Piaski Bankowe
- Piaski Szlacheckie
- Stare Piaski
