= Chocen =

Chocen may refer to:

- Choceň, a town in the Pardubice Region, Czech Republic
- Choceń, a village in Włocławek County, Kuyavian-Pomeranian Voivodeship, Poland
  - Gmina Choceń, an administrative district

== See also ==
- Chocenice, a village and municipality in the Czech Republic
- Chotzen syndrome, an autosomal dominant congenital disorder
