= Bodzanowo =

Bodzanowo may refer to the following places:

- Bodzanowo, Radziejów County in Kuyavian-Pomeranian Voivodeship (central Poland)
- Bodzanowo, Gmina Choceń in Kuyavian-Pomeranian Voivodeship (central Poland)
- Bodzanowo, Gmina Lubraniec in Kuyavian-Pomeranian Voivodeship (central Poland)
