= Koniec =

Koniec may refer to the following places:

- Koniec, Kuyavian-Pomeranian Voivodeship (central Poland)
- Koniec, Lublin Voivodeship (east Poland)
- Koniec, Subcarpathian Voivodeship (south-east Poland)
