= Pivovar Zhůřák =

Craft brewery in the Czech Republic

Coordinates: 49.53764°N 13.51573°E

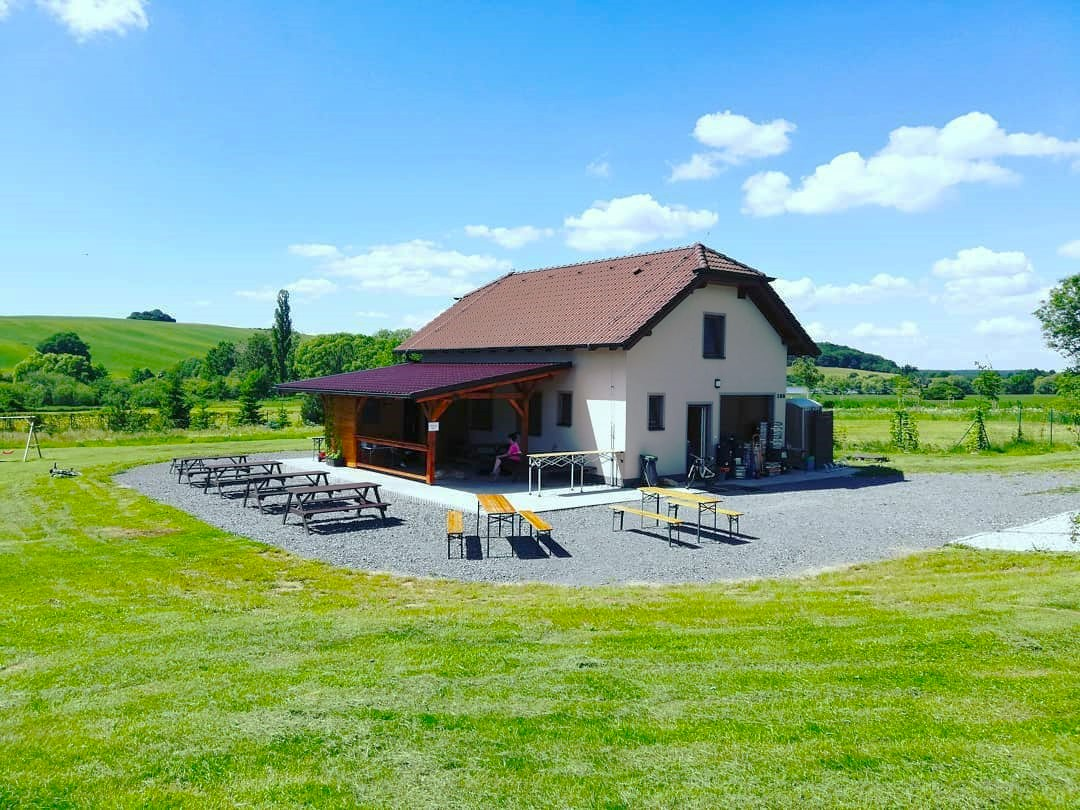
- Pivovar Zhůřák building and beer garden
- Interactive map of Pivovar Zhůřák
- Type: Microbrewery
- Location: Zhůř, Czech Republic
- Opened: 2013
- Annual production volume: approx. 250 L brewhouse
- Owned by: Chris Baerwaldt
- Website: [www.pivovarzhurak.cz

Pivovar Zhůřák is a small independent craft brewery located in Zhůř in the Plzeň Region of the Czech Republic. The brewery was founded in 2013 by American brewer Chris Baerwaldt, who relocated from California to the Czech Republic and established one of the country’s earliest American-style ale breweries.

== History ==
The brewery began operations in 2013 in a converted building in Zhůř, using a 250-liter electric brewhouse. Baerwaldt, who had previously worked in technology and software product management in the United States, moved to the Czech Republic with his Czech wife and started homebrewing before expanding into commercial production.

The brewery’s name derives from the village of Zhůř (hence *Zhůřák* = “from Zhůř”). Its branding features a stylized “Z-sun” logo and bilingual (English-Czech) beer names.

== Beers ==
Pivovar Zhůřák produces mainly top-fermented ales, including American-style IPAs, NEIPAs, and pale ales. Seasonal and experimental releases have included *Kvejčák 14° Kveik NEIPA*, *Sabrosko 13° Single Hop IPA*, *Hopinka*, and *ValHAZEa IPA*. The brewery’s lineup changes frequently, with distribution mainly in kegs to pubs in the Plzeň region and Prague.

== Community and events ==
Pivovar Zhůřák participates regularly in Czech craft-beer events, including the nationwide festival Noc Pivovarů ('Night of Breweries'), which promotes small independent breweries across the country. The brewery has also collaborated with regional peers such as Pivovar Raven (Plzeň) and Pivstro Plzeň on limited releases and festival projects.

== See also ==
- Beer in the Czech Republic
