= Turowo =

Turowo may refer to the following places:

- Turowo, Kuyavian-Pomeranian Voivodeship (central Poland)
- Turowo, Mława County in Masovian Voivodeship (north-central Poland)
- Turowo, Przasnysz County in Masovian Voivodeship (north-central Poland)
- Turowo, Greater Poland Voivodeship (west-central Poland)
- Turowo, Pomeranian Voivodeship (north Poland)
- Turowo, Ełk County in Warmian-Masurian Voivodeship (north-east Poland)
- Turowo, Nidzica County in Warmian-Masurian Voivodeship (north Poland)
- Turowo, Pisz County in Warmian-Masurian Voivodeship (north Poland)
- Turowo, West Pomeranian Voivodeship (north-west Poland)
