= Świerkowo =

Świerkowo may refer to:

- Świerkowo, Kuyavian-Pomeranian Voivodeship, a village in the administrative district of Gmina Choceń
- Świerkowo, Masovian Voivodeship, a village in the administrative district of Gmina Świercze
