= Skibice =

Skibice may refer to the following places:

- Skibice, Kuyavian-Pomeranian Voivodeship (central Poland)
- Skibice, Lublin Voivodeship (east Poland)
- Skibice, Lubusz Voivodeship (west Poland)
