= Lutobórz =

- Village
- Location within Poland
- Coordinates: 52°28′N 19°5′E
- Country: Poland
- Voivodeship: Kuyavian-Pomeranian
- County: Włocławek
- Gmina: Choceń

Lutobórz [luˈtɔbuʂ] is a village in the administrative district of Gmina Choceń, within Włocławek County, Kuyavian-Pomeranian Voivodeship, in north-central Poland.
