= Gmina Lubraniec =

Gmina Lubraniec Lubraniec Commune
- Gmina
- Coat of arms
- Interactive map of Gmina Lubraniec
- Coordinates (Lubraniec): 52°32′31″N 18°50′8″E
- Country: Poland
- Voivodeship: Kuyavian-Pomeranian
- County: Włocławek County
- Seat: Lubraniec

Area
  - Total: 148.18 km^{2} (57.21 sq mi)

Population (2006)
  - Total: 10,003
  - Density: 67.506/km^{2} (174.84/sq mi)
  - Urban: 3,207
  - Rural: 6,796
- Time zone: UTC+1 (CET)
  - Summer (DST): UTC+2 (CEST)
- Vehicle registration: CWL
- Website: http://www.lubraniec.pl/

Gmina Lubraniec is an urban-rural gmina (administrative district) in Włocławek County, Kuyavian-Pomeranian Voivodeship, in central Poland. Its seat is the town of Lubraniec, which lies approximately 19 kilometres (12 mi) south-west of Włocławek and 57 km (35 mi) south of Toruń.

The gmina covers an area of 148.18 square kilometres (57.2 sq mi), and as of 2006 its total population is 10,003 (out of which the population of Lubraniec amounts to 3,207, and the population of the rural part of the gmina is 6,796).

== Villages ==
Apart from the town of Lubraniec, Gmina Lubraniec contains the villages and settlements of Agnieszkowo, Annowo, Bielawy, Biernatki, Bodzanowo, Borek, Czajno, Dąbie Kujawskie, Dąbie Poduchowne, Dęby Janiszewskie, Dobierzyn, Florianowo, Gołębin-Parcele, Gołębin-Wieś, Górniak, Janiszewo, Józefowo, Kazanie, Kłobia, Kłobia Nowa, Kolonia Łódź, Kolonia Piaski, Koniec, Korzeszynek, Krowice, Lubrańczyk, Lubraniec-Parcele, Marysin, Milżyn, Milżynek, Ossowo, Piaski, Rabinowo, Redecz Kalny, Redecz Wielki-Parcele, Redecz Wielki-Wieś, Sarnowo, Siarczyce, Siemnówek, Skaszyn, Smogorzewo, Stok, Sułkowo, Świątniki, Turowo, Wola Sosnowa, Zgłowiączka and Żydowo.

== Neighbouring gminas ==
Gmina Lubraniec is bordered by the gminas of Boniewo, Brześć Kujawski, Choceń, Izbica Kujawska, Osięciny, Topólka and Włocławek.
