= Gajówka, Kuyavian-Pomeranian Voivodeship =

Gajówka
- Village
- Location within Poland
- Coordinates: 52°32′17″N 19°04′55″E
- Country: Poland
- Voivodeship: Kuyavian-Pomeranian
- County: Włocławek
- Gmina: Choceń

Gajówka [ɡaˈjufka] is a village in the administrative district of Gmina Choceń, within Włocławek County, Kuyavian-Pomeranian Voivodeship, in north-central Poland.
