= Krukowo, Kuyavian-Pomeranian Voivodeship =

Krukowo
- Village
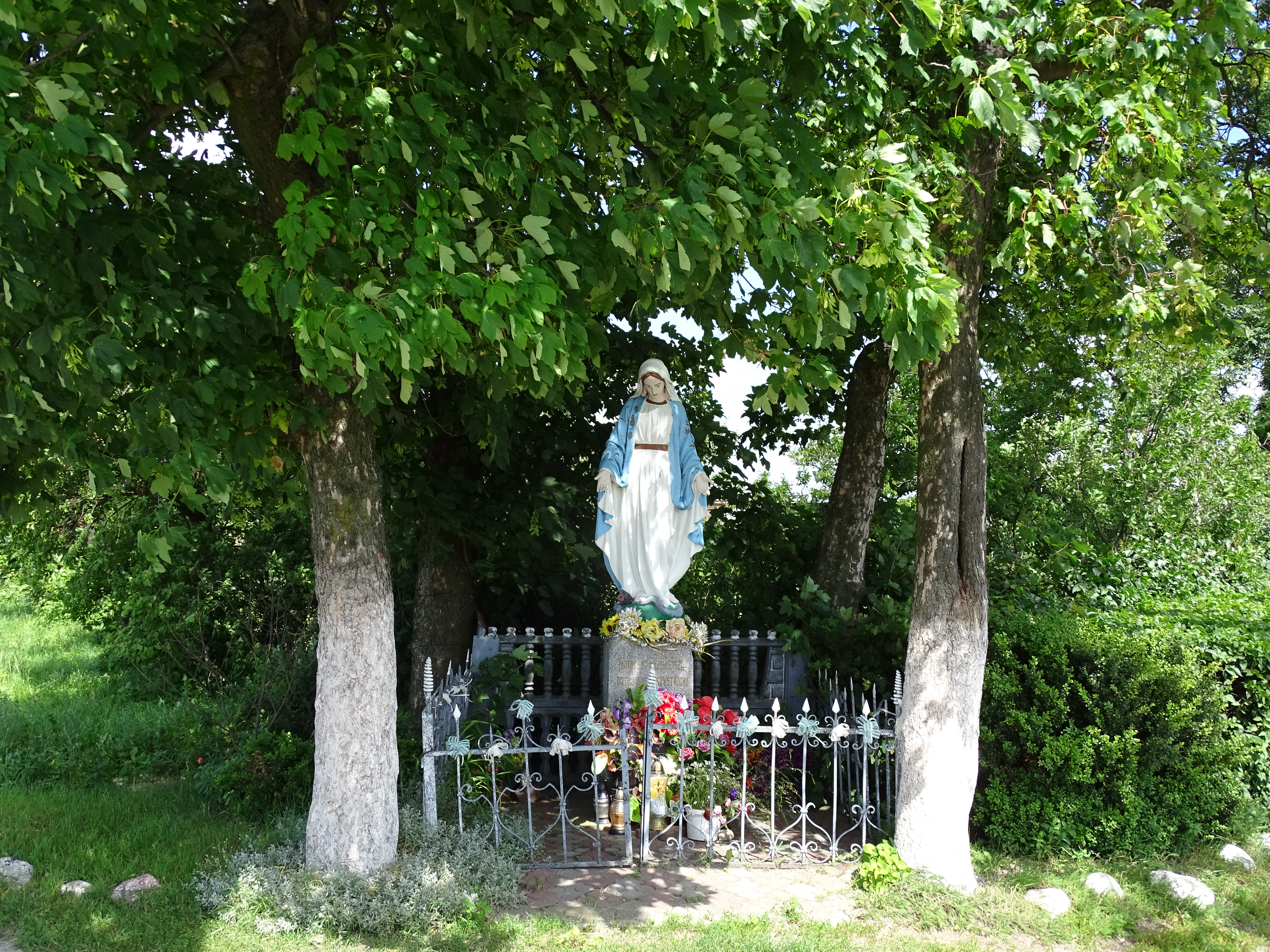
- Roadside figure of Virgin Mary

- Location within Poland
- Coordinates: 52°30′N 19°0′E
- Country: Poland
- Voivodeship: Kuyavian-Pomeranian
- County: Włocławek
- Gmina: Choceń
- Time zone: UTC+1 (CET)
  - Summer (DST): UTC+2 (CEST)

Krukowo [kruˈkɔvɔ] is a village in the administrative district of Gmina Choceń, within Włocławek County, Kuyavian-Pomeranian Voivodeship, in central Poland.
