= Zakrzewek, Włocławek County =

Zakrzewek
- Village
- Location within Poland
- Coordinates: 52°29′36″N 19°02′24″E
- Country: Poland
- Voivodeship: Kuyavian-Pomeranian
- County: Włocławek
- Gmina: Choceń

Zakrzewek [zaˈkʂɛvɛk] is a village in the administrative district of Gmina Choceń, within Włocławek County, Kuyavian-Pomeranian Voivodeship, in north-central Poland.
