= Stare Nakonowo =

- Village
- Location within Poland
- Coordinates: 52°32′52″N 19°02′59″E
- Country: Poland
- Voivodeship: Kuyavian-Pomeranian
- County: Włocławek
- Gmina: Choceń

Stare Nakonowo [ˈstarɛ nakɔˈnɔvɔ] is a village in the administrative district of Gmina Choceń, within Włocławek County, Kuyavian-Pomeranian Voivodeship, in north-central Poland.
