= Florianowo, Kuyavian-Pomeranian Voivodeship =

Florianowo
- Village
- Location within Poland
- Coordinates: 52°31′12″N 18°57′9″E
- Country: Poland
- Voivodeship: Kuyavian-Pomeranian
- County: Włocławek
- Gmina: Lubraniec
- Population: 110
- Time zone: UTC+1 (CET)
  - Summer (DST): UTC+2 (CEST)

Florianowo [flɔrjaˈnɔvɔ] is a village in the administrative district of Gmina Lubraniec, within Włocławek County, Kuyavian-Pomeranian Voivodeship, in central Poland.
