= Grabówka, Kuyavian-Pomeranian Voivodeship =

Grabówka
- Village
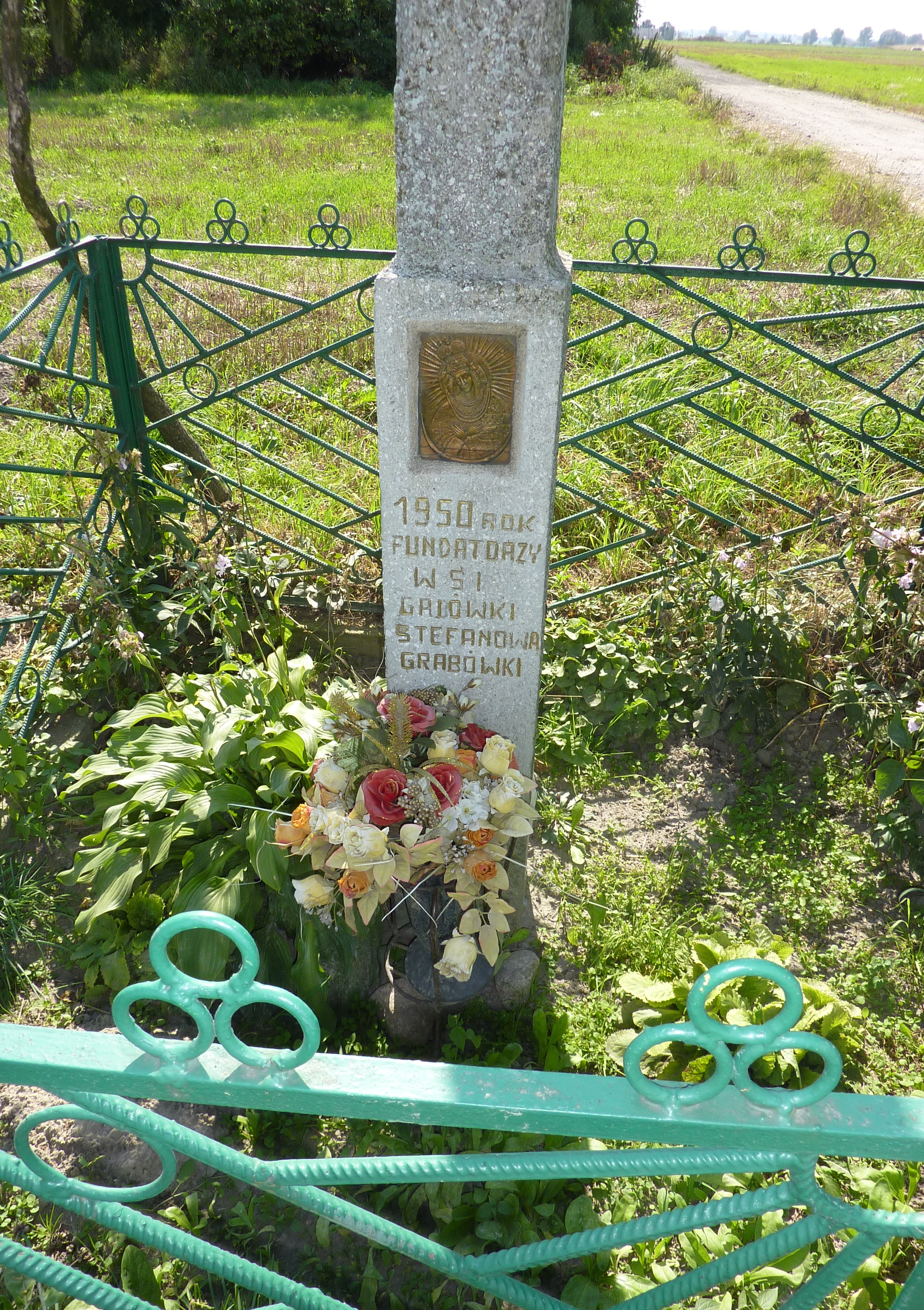
- Wayside crosses in Grabówka

- Location within Poland
- Coordinates: 52°32′26″N 19°03′51″E
- Country: Poland
- Voivodeship: Kuyavian-Pomeranian
- County: Włocławek
- Gmina: Choceń

Grabówka [ɡraˈbufka] is a village in the administrative district of Gmina Choceń, within Włocławek County, Kuyavian-Pomeranian Voivodeship, in north-central Poland.
