= Jerzewo, Kuyavian-Pomeranian Voivodeship =

Jerzewo
- Village
- Location within Poland
- Coordinates: 52°29′28″N 19°01′02″E
- Country: Poland
- Voivodeship: Kuyavian-Pomeranian
- County: Włocławek
- Gmina: Choceń

Jerzewo [jɛˈʐɛvɔ] is a village in the administrative district of Gmina Choceń, within Włocławek County, Kuyavian-Pomeranian Voivodeship, in north-central Poland.
