= Czerniewice, Kuyavian-Pomeranian Voivodeship =

Czerniewice
- Village
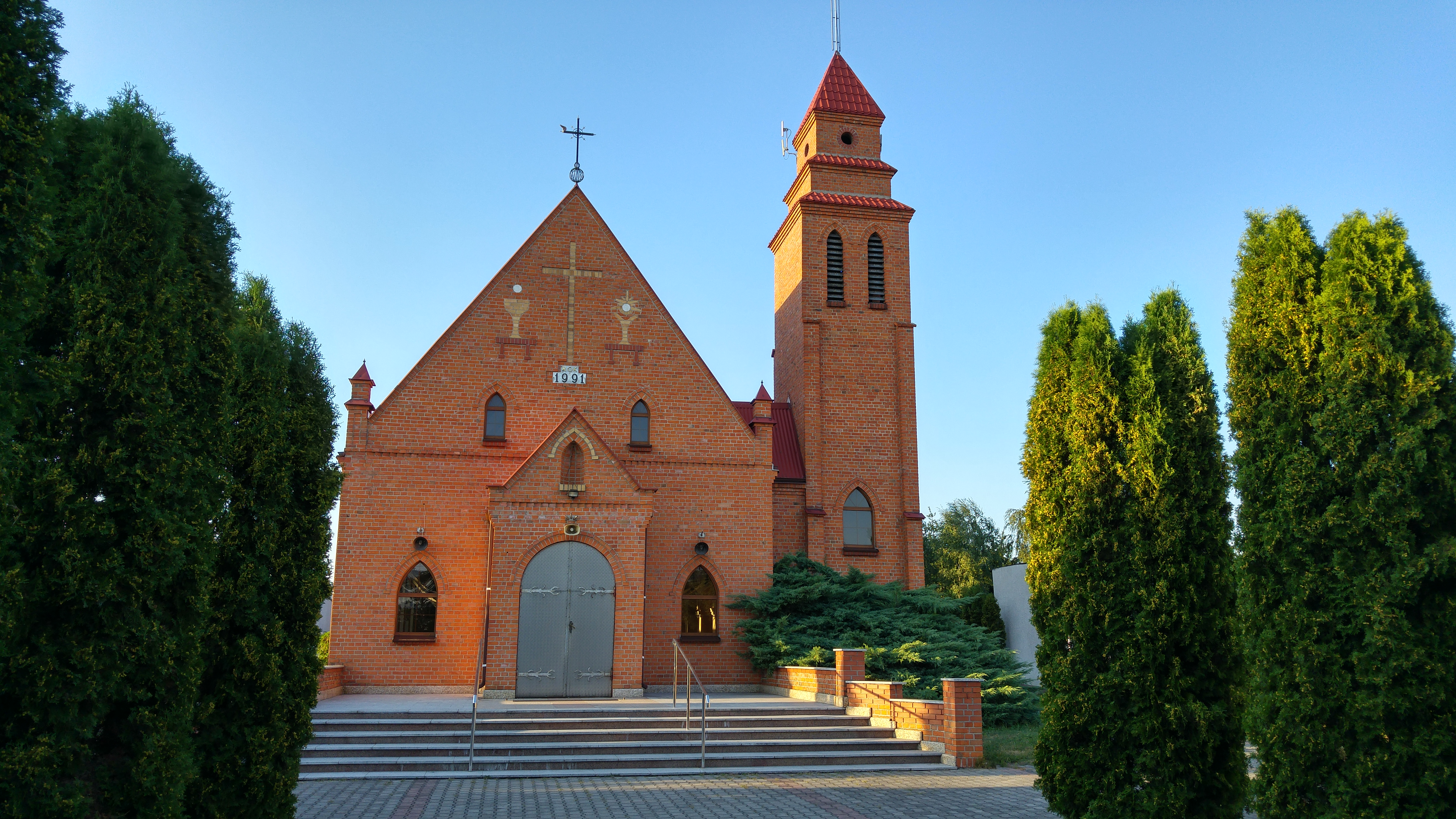
- Saint Anthony church in Czerniewice

- Location within Poland
- Coordinates: 52°31′N 19°6′E
- Country: Poland
- Voivodeship: Kuyavian-Pomeranian
- County: Włocławek
- Gmina: Choceń
- Time zone: UTC+1 (CET)
  - Summer (DST): UTC+2 (CEST)
- Vehicle registration: CWL

Czerniewice [t͡ʂɛrɲɛˈvit͡sɛ] is a village in the administrative district of Gmina Choceń, within Włocławek County, Kuyavian-Pomeranian Voivodeship, in central Poland. It is located in the historic region of Kuyavia.

There is a train station in the village.

== History ==
During the German occupation (World War II), the occupiers carried out expulsions of Poles from Czerniewice in 1940–1941. Expelled Poles were initially sent to a transit camp in Łódź and then deported to the General Government in the more eastern part of German-occupied Poland, while their houses were handed over to German colonists as part of the Lebensraum policy.
