= Borzymowice =

- Village
- Location within Poland
- Coordinates: 52°29′N 18°58′E
- Country: Poland
- Voivodeship: Kuyavian-Pomeranian
- County: Włocławek
- Gmina: Choceń

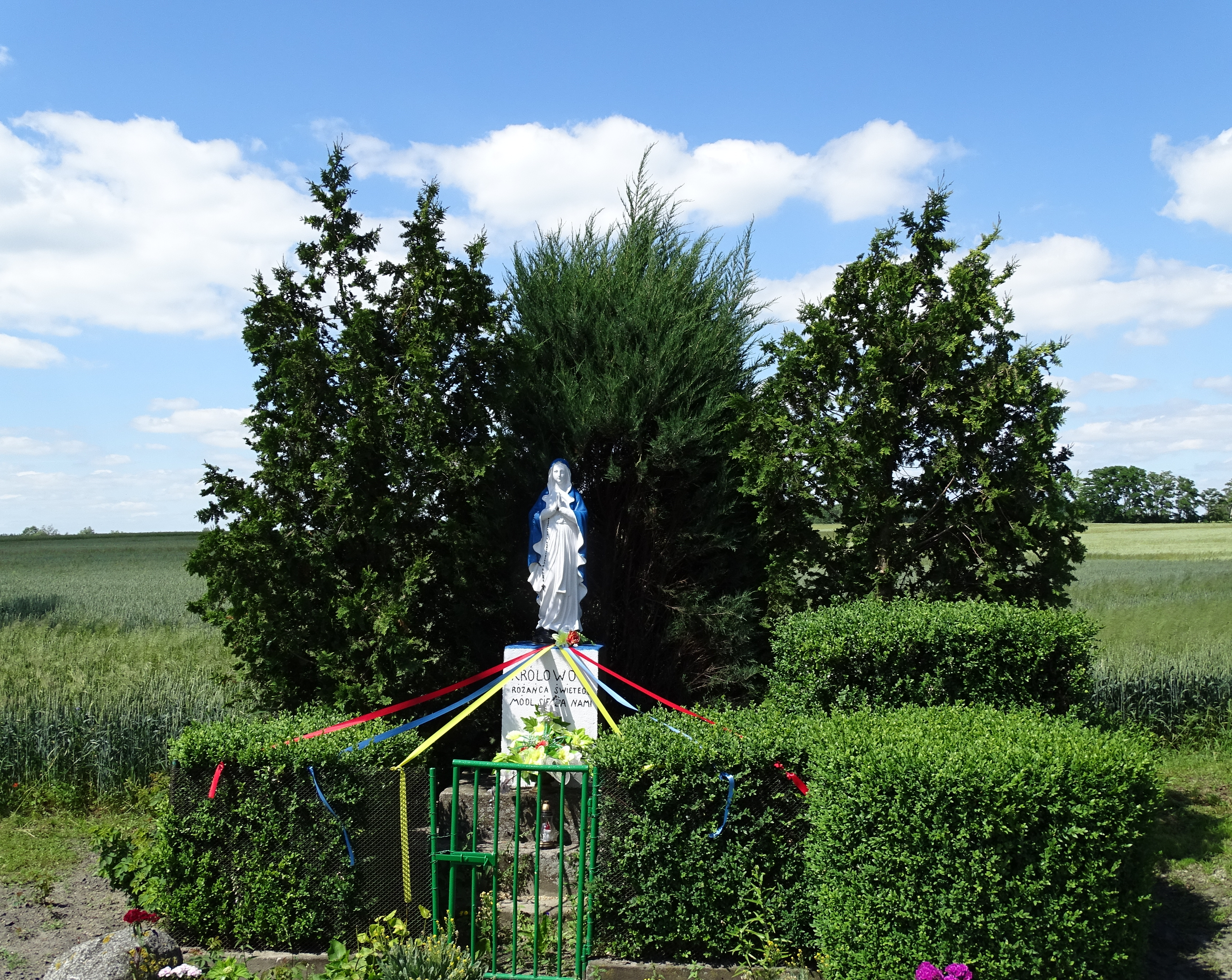
The roadside shrine.

Borzymowice (Polish pronunciation: [bɔʐɨmɔˈvit͡sɛ]) is a village in the administrative district of Gmina Choceń, within Włocławek County, Kuyavian-Pomeranian Voivodeship, in north-central Poland.
