= Redecz Kalny =

- Village
- Location within Poland
- Coordinates: 52°34′N 18°50′E
- Country: Poland
- Voivodeship: Kuyavian-Pomeranian
- County: Włocławek
- Gmina: Lubraniec
- Time zone: UTC+1 (CET)
  - Summer (DST): UTC+2 (CEST)
- Vehicle registration: CWL

Redecz Kalny [ˈrɛdɛt͡ʂ ˈkalnɨ] is a village in the administrative district of Gmina Lubraniec, within Włocławek County, Kuyavian-Pomeranian Voivodeship, in central Poland.
