= Szczytno, Kuyavian-Pomeranian Voivodeship =

Szczytno
- Village
- Location within Poland
- Coordinates: 52°28′6″N 18°57′25″E
- Country: Poland
- Voivodeship: Kuyavian-Pomeranian
- County: Włocławek
- Gmina: Choceń
- Population: 150

Szczytno [ˈʂt͡ʂɨtnɔ] is a village in the administrative district of Gmina Choceń, within Włocławek County, Kuyavian-Pomeranian Voivodeship, in north-central Poland. The village has an approximate population of 150.
