= Lubraniec =

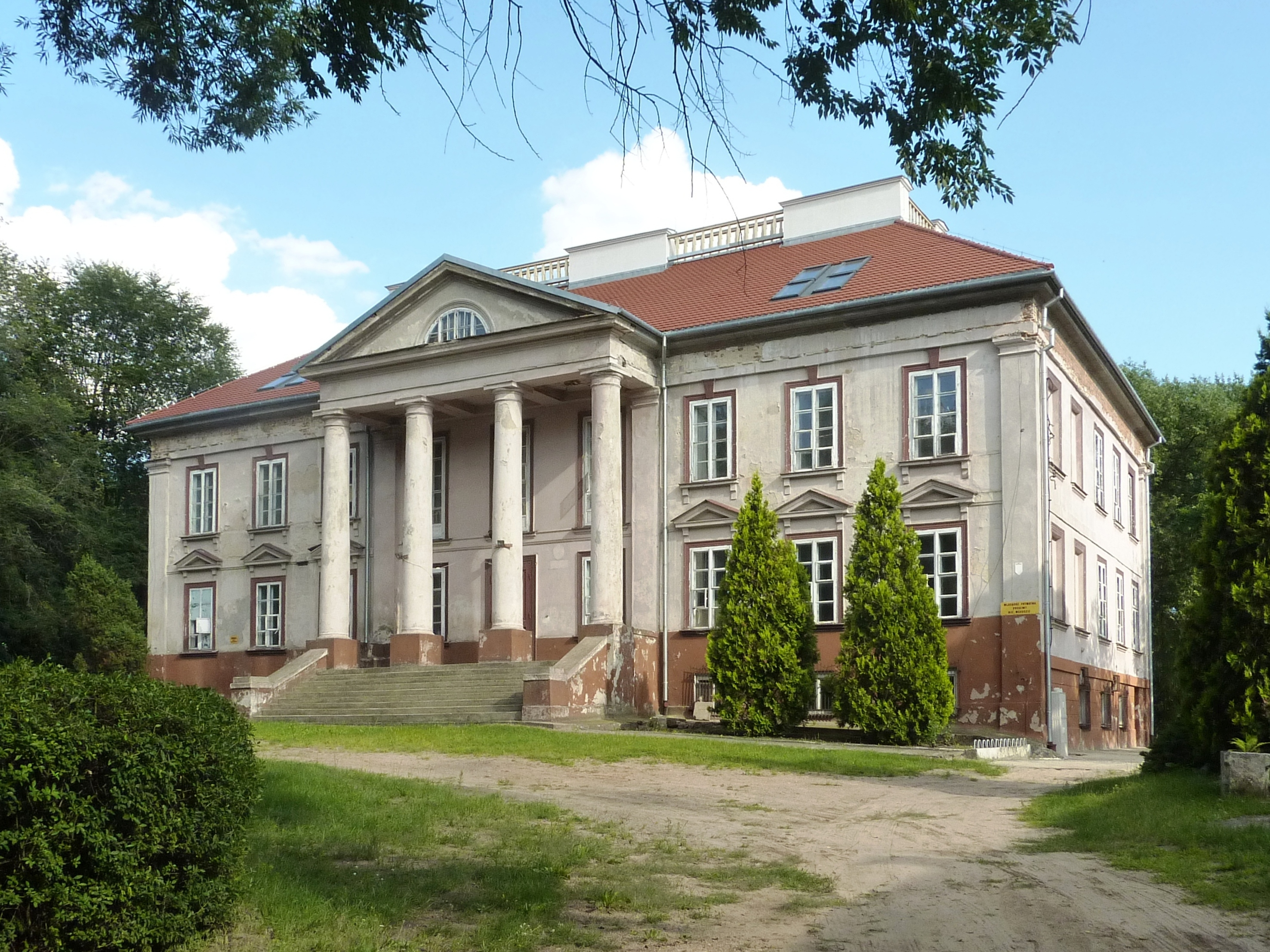
- The palace, built 1827

- Coat of arms

- Location within Poland
- Coordinates: 52°32′31″N 18°50′8″E
- Country: Poland
- Voivodeship: Kuyavian-Pomeranian
- County: Włocławek
- Gmina: Lubraniec
- Town rights: 1509

Area
  - Total: 1.97 km^{2} (0.76 sq mi)

Population (2010)
  - Total: 3,130
  - Density: 1,590/km^{2} (4,120/sq mi)
- Time zone: UTC+1 (CET)
  - Summer (DST): UTC+2 (CEST)
- Postal code: 87-890
- Vehicle registration: CWL
- Website: http://www.lubraniec.pl

Lubraniec [luˈbraɲɛt͡s] is a town in the Włocławek County in the Kuyavian-Pomeranian Voivodeship in central Poland, with 3,130 inhabitants (2010). It is located in the historic region of Kuyavia.

== History ==
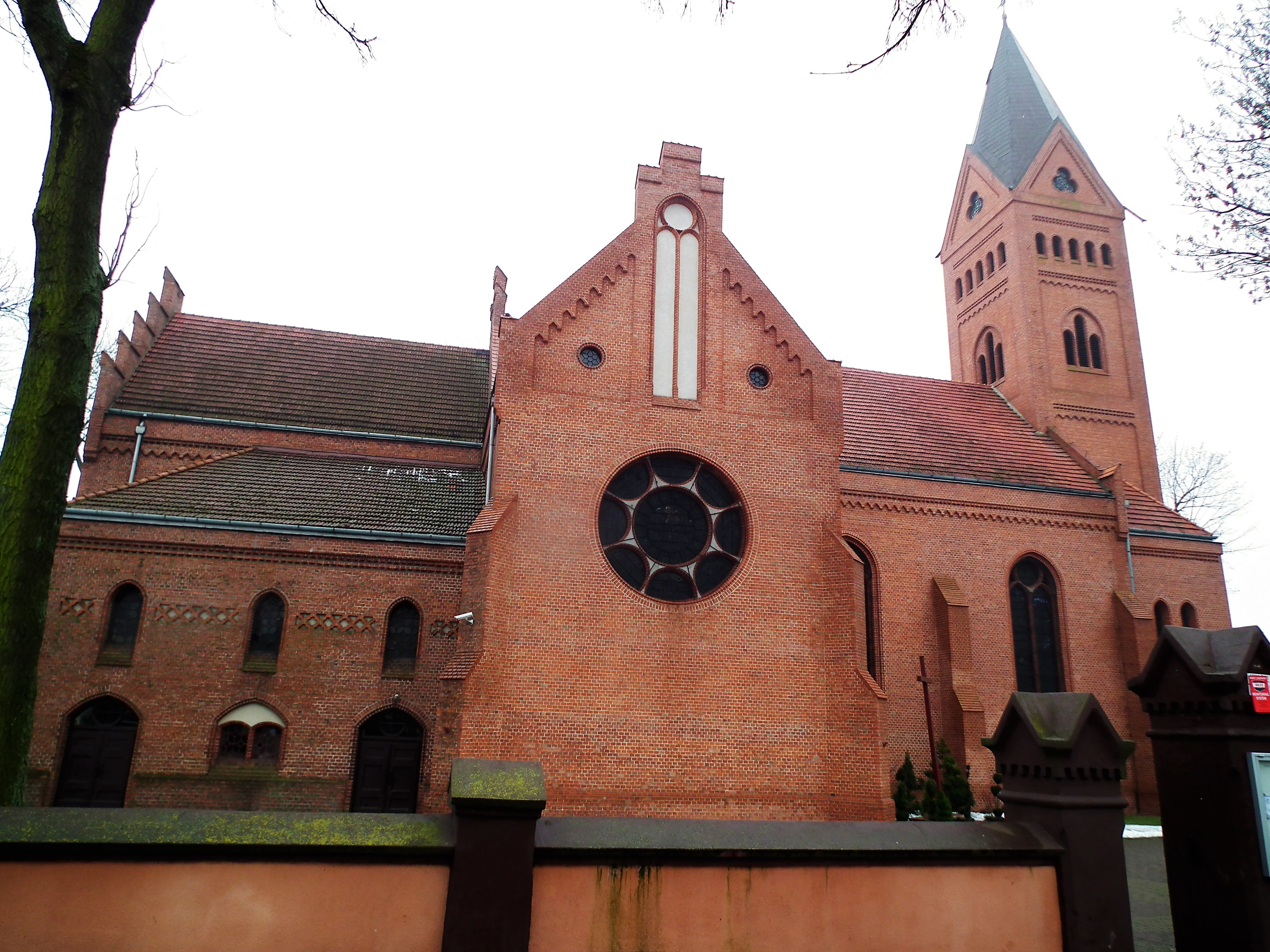
Our Lady of the Scapular church

Lubraniec was the ancestral seat of the Lubrański noble family. Lubraniec was granted town rights in 1509 by King Sigismund I the Old. It was a private town, administratively located in the Brześć Kujawski County in the Brześć Kujawski Voivodeship in the Greater Poland Province of the Kingdom of Poland. After the Lubrański family became extinct, the town passed to the Dąbski family. Paweł Dąbski, castellan of Brześć Kujawski, granted various privileges to local Jews, confirmed in 1780 by King Stanisław August Poniatowski.

Following the joint German-Soviet invasion of Poland, which started World War II in September 1939, the village was occupied by Germany until 1945. In 1941, the occupiers carried out expulsions of 300 Poles, who were deported to forced labour in Germany, while their houses were handed over to German colonists as part of the Lebensraum policy.

== Demographics ==
Historical population
Year	Pop.	±%
1921	2,196	—
1931	2,559	+16.5%
2010	3,130	+22.3%

== Transport ==
Lubraniec is bypassed by voivodeship road 270 to the west. This road connects Lubraniec to Brześć Kujawski to the north and to Koło to the south.

The nearest railway station is in Włocławek.

== International relations ==
=== Twin towns and sister cities ===
Lubraniec is a twinned with Dutch Winsum.
