= Wilkowice, Kuyavian-Pomeranian Voivodeship =

Wilkowice
- Village
- Location within Poland
- Coordinates: 52°30′19″N 19°02′44″E
- Country: Poland
- Voivodeship: Kuyavian-Pomeranian
- County: Włocławek
- Gmina: Choceń
- Time zone: UTC+1 (CET)
  - Summer (DST): UTC+2 (CEST)

Wilkowice [vilkɔˈvit͡sɛ] is a village in the administrative district of Gmina Choceń, within Włocławek County, Kuyavian-Pomeranian Voivodeship, in central Poland.

Seven Polish citizens were murdered by Nazi Germany in the village during World War II.
