= Podgórz, Toruń =

District of Toruń, Poland

Podgórz
- District of Toruń
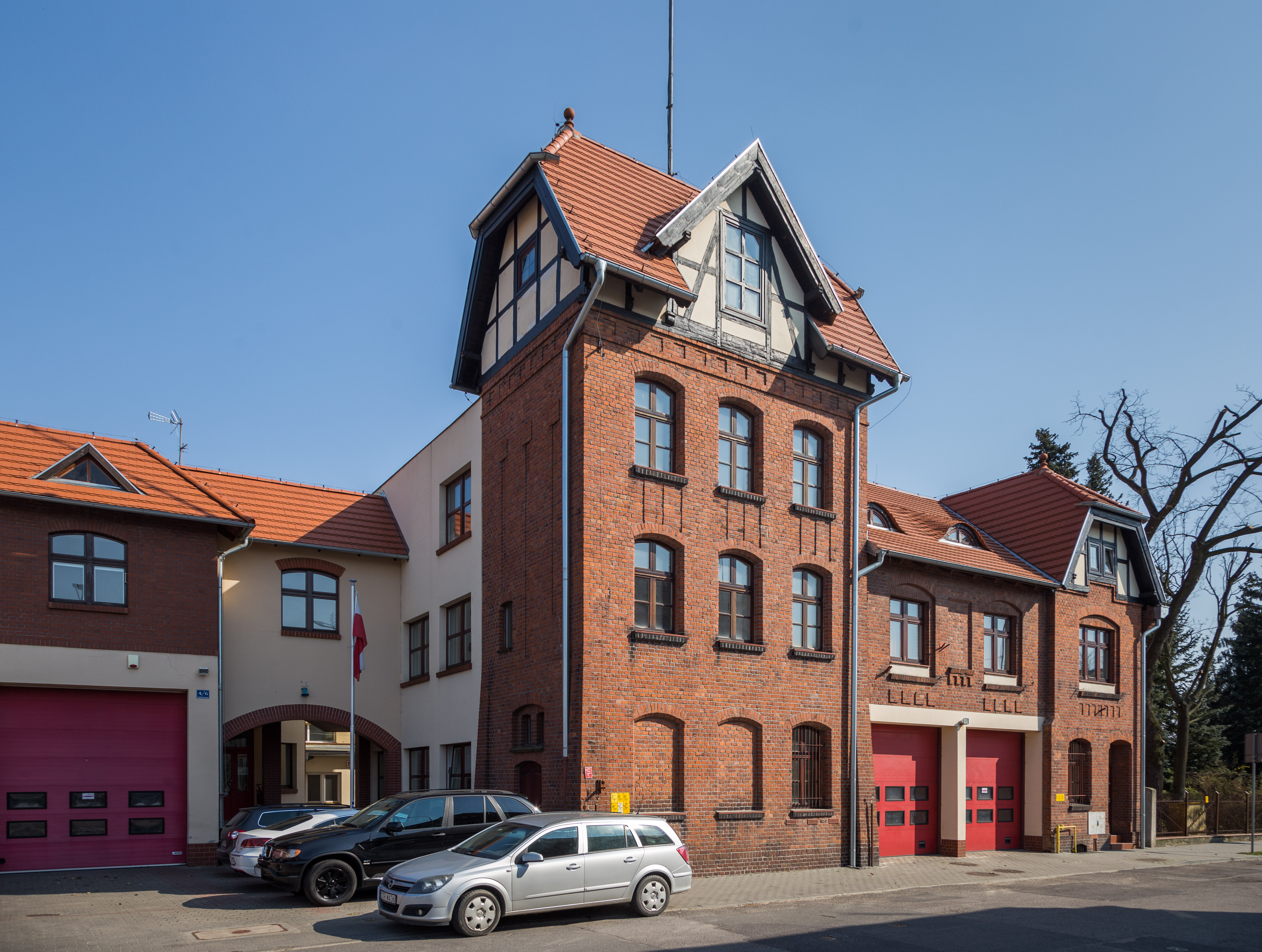
- Fire station in Podgórz

- Coat of arms

- Location of Podgórz within Toruń
- Coordinates: 52°59′16″N 18°35′16″E
- Country: Poland
- Voivodeship: Kuyavian-Pomeranian
- County/City: Toruń
- Within city limits: 1938
- Time zone: UTC+1 (CET)
  - Summer (DST): UTC+2 (CEST)
- Vehicle registration: CT

Podgórz [ˈpɔdɡuʂ] is a district of Toruń, Poland, located in the southern part of the city, within its part located in the historic region of Kuyavia.

== History ==
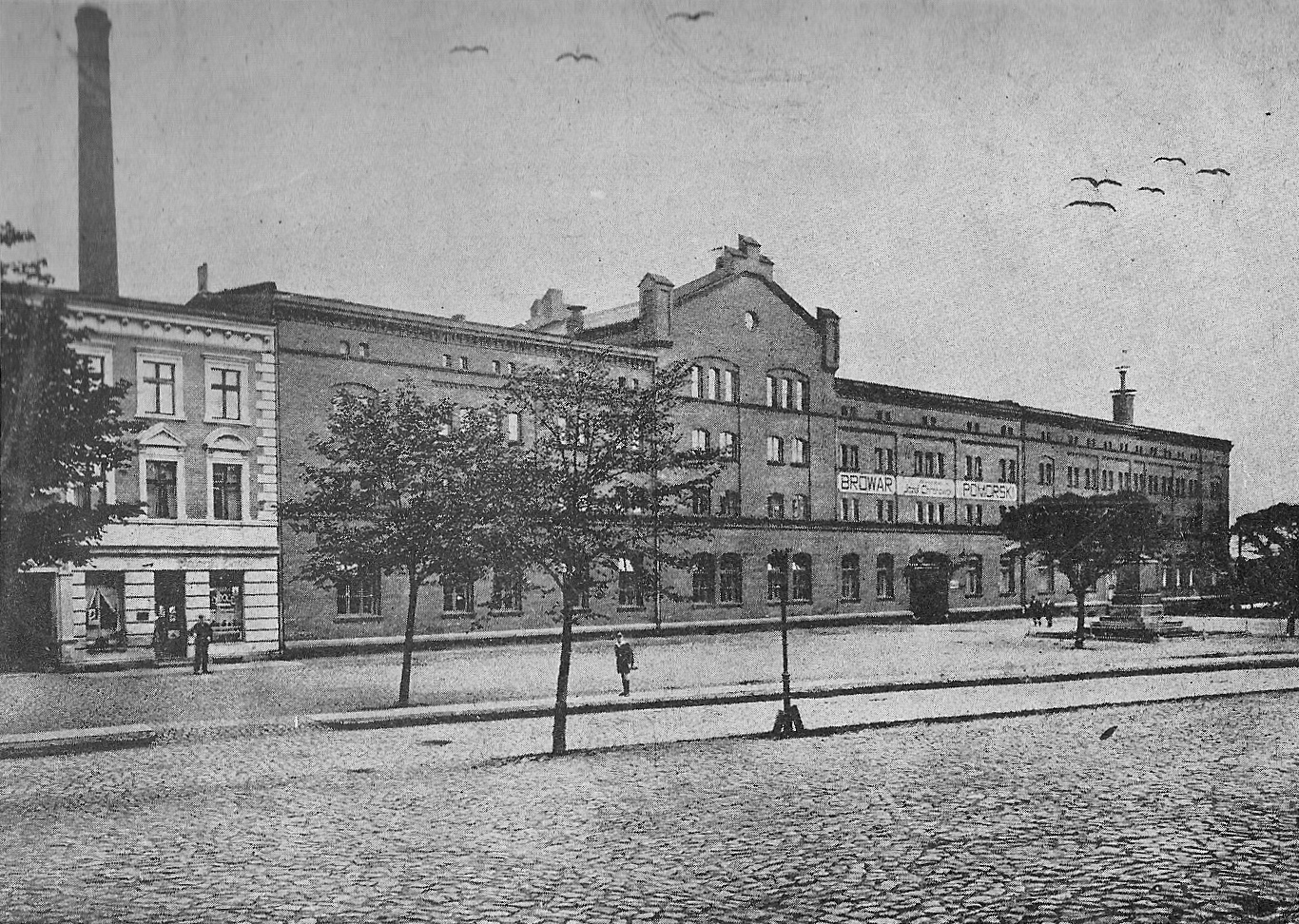
Browar Pomorski, local brewery, in the interbellum

Podgórz was a royal town of the Kingdom of Poland, administratively located in the Inowrocław County in the Inowrocław Voivodeship in the Greater Poland Province. In 1644, the Franciscans moved from Toruń to Podgórz, and castellan of Bydgoszcz and starost of Dybów Stanisław Sokołowski funded the construction of a monastery. After the annexation of Inowrocław by Prussia in 1773, the county seat of the Inowrocław County was moved to Podgórz in 1776. In 1813, the town was devastated by French troops.

In 1934, the adjacent settlement of Piaski was included within the town limits of Podgórz. In 1938, Podgórz was included within the city limits of Toruń, as its left-bank district.
