= Ługowiska =

- Village
- Location within Poland
- Coordinates: 52°27′9″N 18°58′10″E
- Country: Poland
- Voivodeship: Kuyavian-Pomeranian
- County: Włocławek
- Gmina: Choceń
- Population: 150

Ługowiska [wuɡɔˈviska] is a village in the administrative district of Gmina Choceń, within Włocławek County, Kuyavian-Pomeranian Voivodeship, in north-central Poland.
