= Jarantowice, Włocławek County =

Jarantowice
- Village
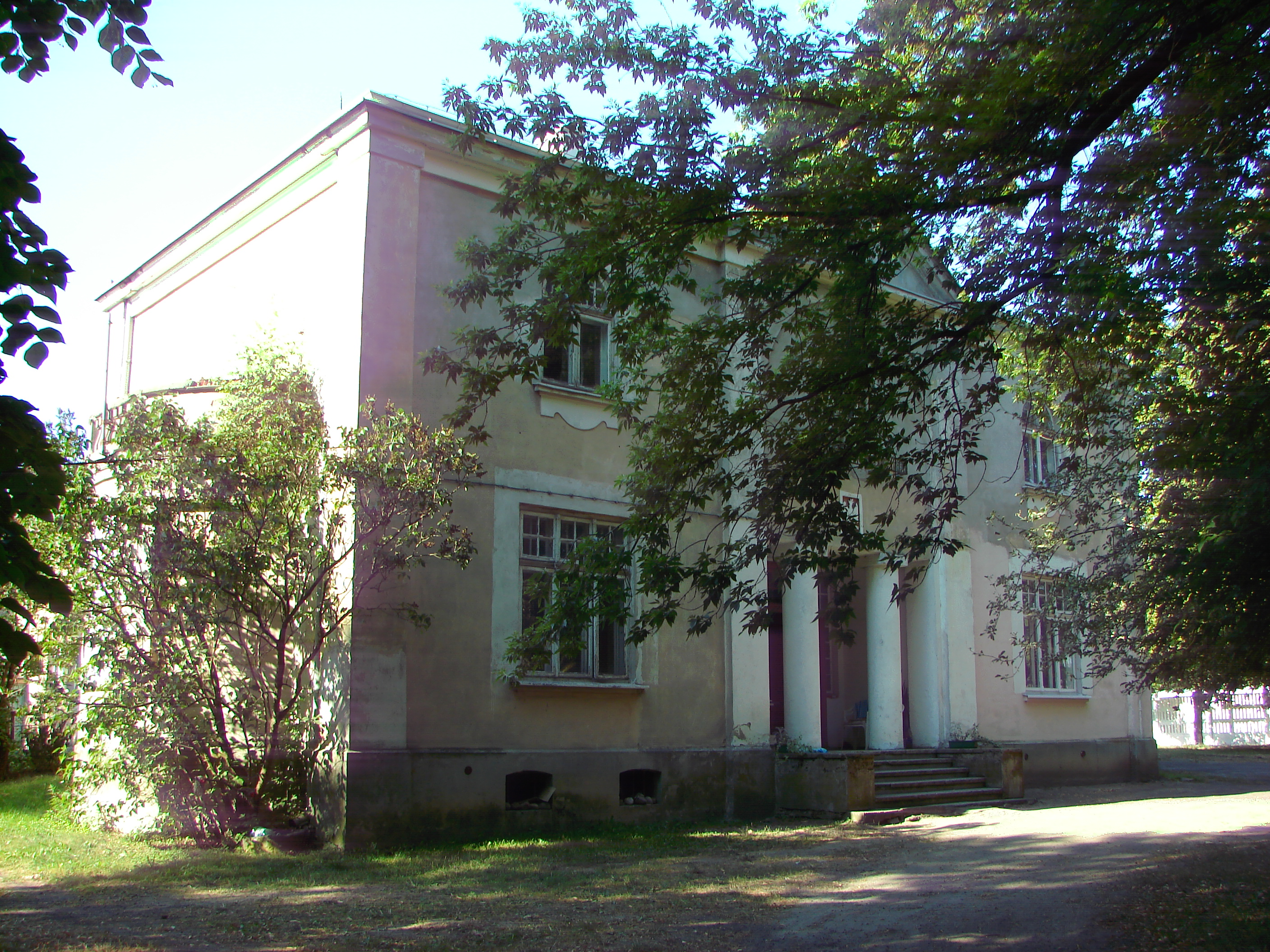

- Location within Poland
- Coordinates: 52°29′48″N 19°00′34″E
- Country: Poland
- Voivodeship: Kuyavian-Pomeranian
- County: Włocławek
- Gmina: Choceń

Jarantowice [jarantɔˈvit͡sɛ] is a village in the administrative district of Gmina Choceń, within Włocławek County, Kuyavian-Pomeranian Voivodeship, in north-central Poland.
