= Stefanowo, Włocławek County =

Stefanowo
- Village
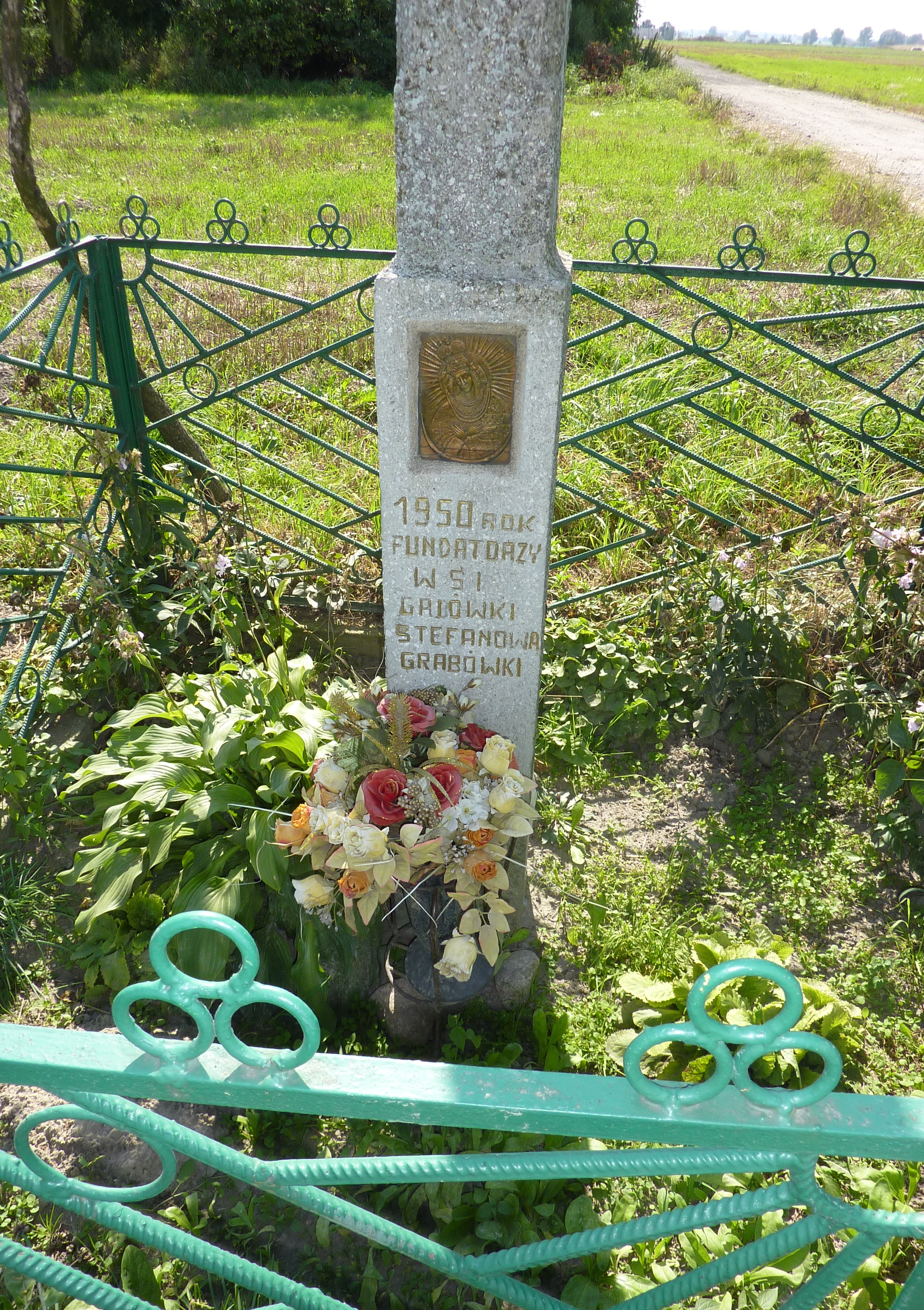

- Location within Poland
- Coordinates: 52°32′14″N 19°04′16″E
- Country: Poland
- Voivodeship: Kuyavian-Pomeranian
- County: Włocławek
- Gmina: Choceń

Stefanowo [stɛfaˈnɔvɔ] is a village in the administrative district of Gmina Choceń, within Włocławek County, Kuyavian-Pomeranian Voivodeship, in north-central Poland.
