= Czajno =

- Village
- Location within Poland
- Coordinates: 52°30′36″N 18°47′17″E
- Country: Poland
- Voivodeship: Kuyavian-Pomeranian
- County: Włocławek
- Gmina: Lubraniec
- Time zone: UTC+1 (CET)
  - Summer (DST): UTC+2 (CEST)

Czajno [ˈt͡ʂai̯nɔ] is a village in the administrative district of Gmina Lubraniec, within Włocławek County, Kuyavian-Pomeranian Voivodeship, in central Poland.

Two Polish citizens were murdered by Nazi Germany in the village during World War II.
