= Zapust, Kuyavian-Pomeranian Voivodeship =

Zapust
- Village
- Location within Poland
- Coordinates: 52°27′42″N 18°57′12″E
- Country: Poland
- Voivodeship: Kuyavian-Pomeranian
- County: Włocławek
- Gmina: Choceń

Zapust [ˈzapust] is a village in the administrative district of Gmina Choceń, within Włocławek County, Kuyavian-Pomeranian Voivodeship, in north-central Poland.
