= Dąbie Kujawskie =

- Village
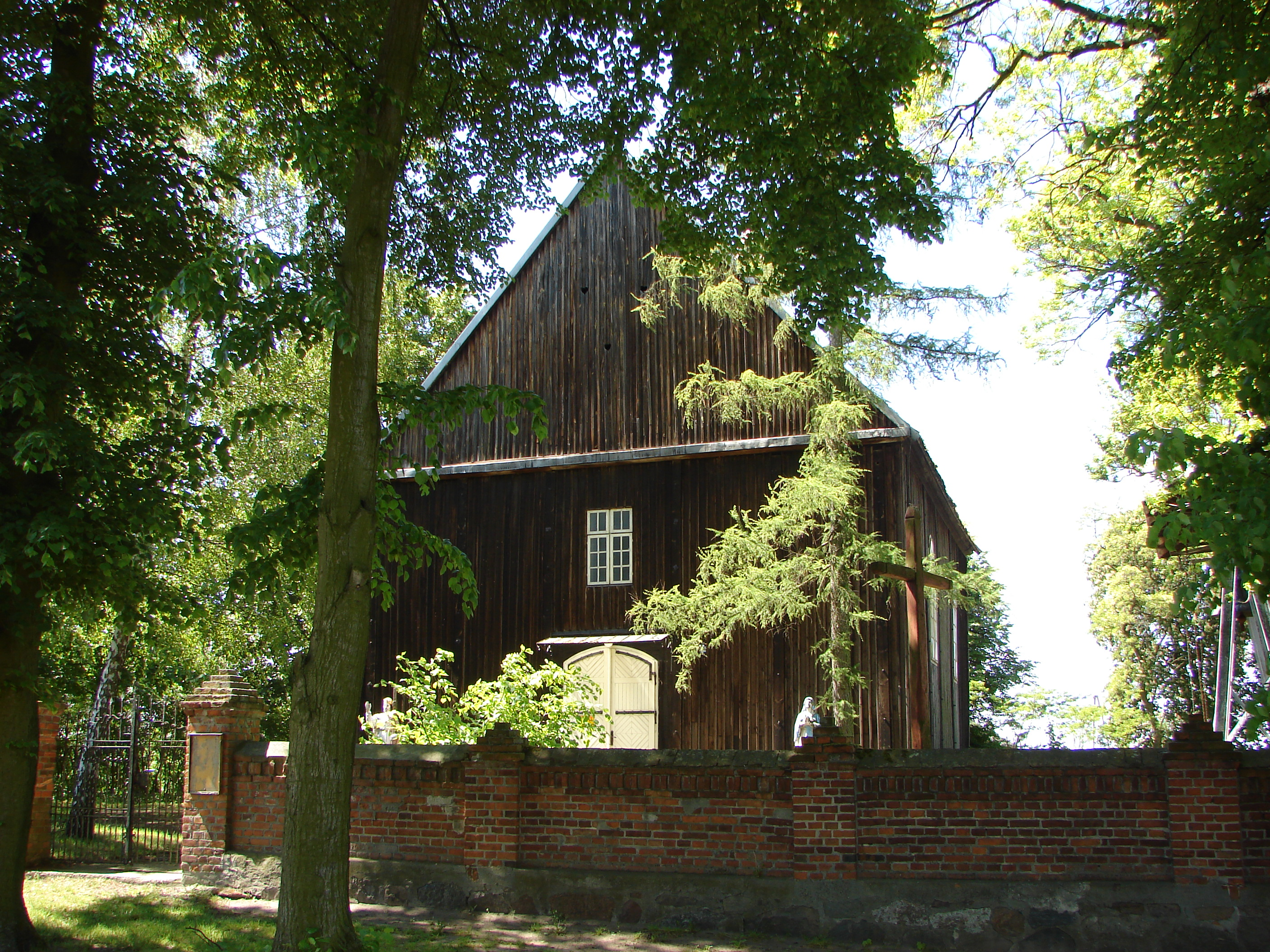
- The Saint Trinity wooden church from 1789 – 1790

- Location within Poland
- Coordinates: 52°34′00″N 18°46′00″E
- Country: Poland
- Voivodeship: Kuyavian-Pomeranian
- County: Włocławek
- Gmina: Lubraniec
- Time zone: UTC+1 (CET)
  - Summer (DST): UTC+2 (CEST)

Dąbie Kujawskie [ˈdɔmbjɛ kuˈjafskʲɛ] is a village in the administrative district of Gmina Lubraniec, within Włocławek County, Kuyavian-Pomeranian Voivodeship, in central Poland.
