= Olganowo =

- Village
- Location within Poland
- Coordinates: 52°31′07″N 18°59′08″E
- Country: Poland
- Voivodeship: Kuyavian-Pomeranian
- County: Włocławek
- Gmina: Choceń

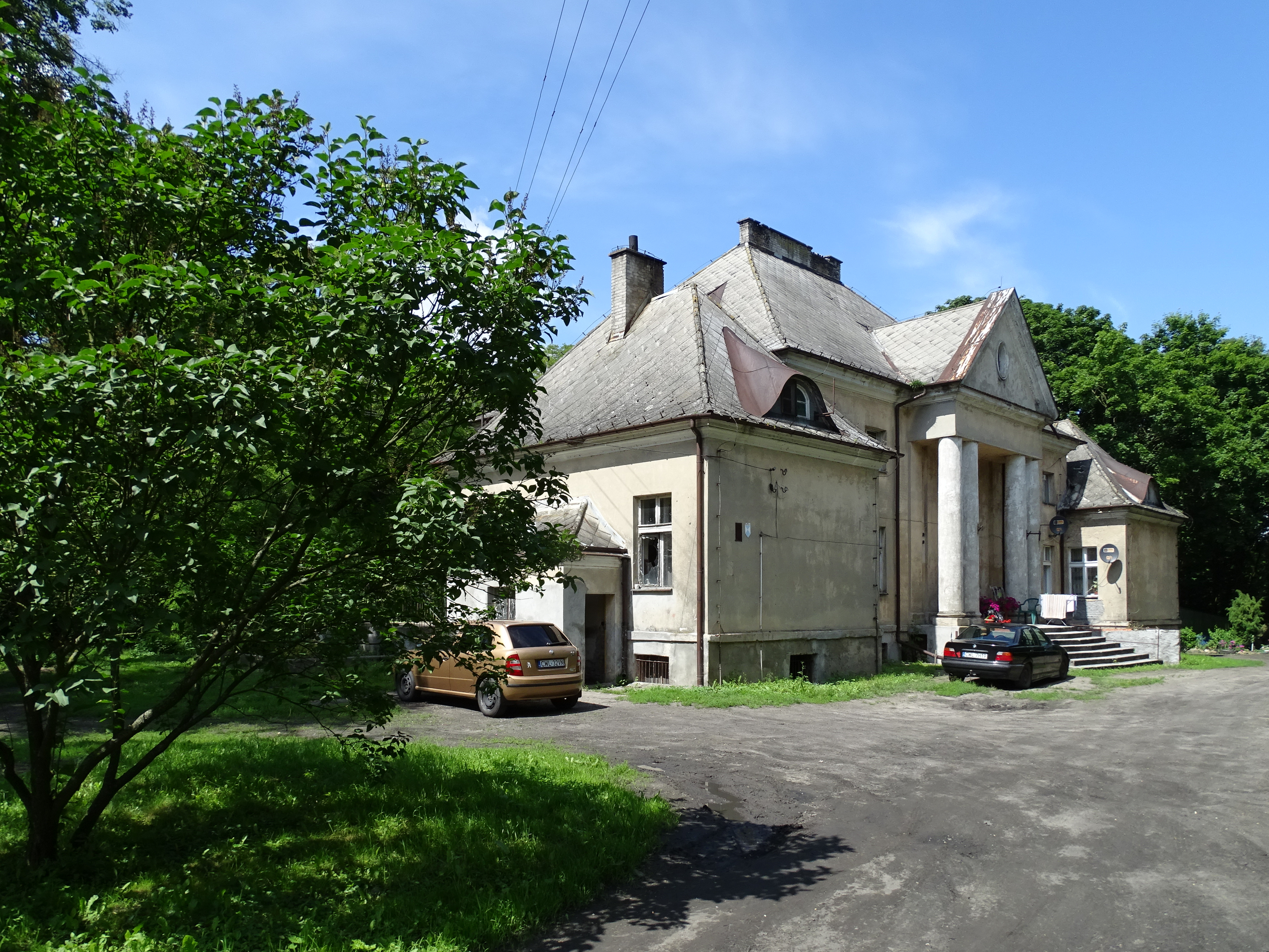
The manor house.

Olganowo [ɔlɡaˈnɔvɔ] is a village in the administrative district of Gmina Choceń, within Włocławek County, Kuyavian-Pomeranian Voivodeship, in north-central Poland.
