= Lubraniec-Parcele =

- Village
- Location within Poland
- Coordinates: 52°33′10″N 18°49′57″E
- Country: Poland
- Voivodeship: Kuyavian-Pomeranian
- County: Włocławek
- Gmina: Lubraniec
- Time zone: UTC+1 (CET)
  - Summer (DST): UTC+2 (CEST)
- Vehicle registration: CWL

Lubraniec-Parcele [luˈbraɲɛt͡s parˈt͡sɛlɛ] is a village in the administrative district of Gmina Lubraniec, within Włocławek County, Kuyavian-Pomeranian Voivodeship, in central Poland.
