= Filipki, Kuyavian-Pomeranian Voivodeship =

Filipki
- Village
- Location within Poland
- Coordinates: 52°31′53″N 19°3′15″E
- Country: Poland
- Voivodeship: Kuyavian-Pomeranian
- County: Włocławek
- Gmina: Choceń

Filipki (Polish pronunciation: [fiˈlipkʲi]) is a village in the administrative district of Gmina Choceń, within Włocławek County, Kuyavian-Pomeranian Voivodeship, in north-central Poland.
