= Śmiłowice, Kuyavian-Pomeranian Voivodeship =

Śmiłowice
- Village
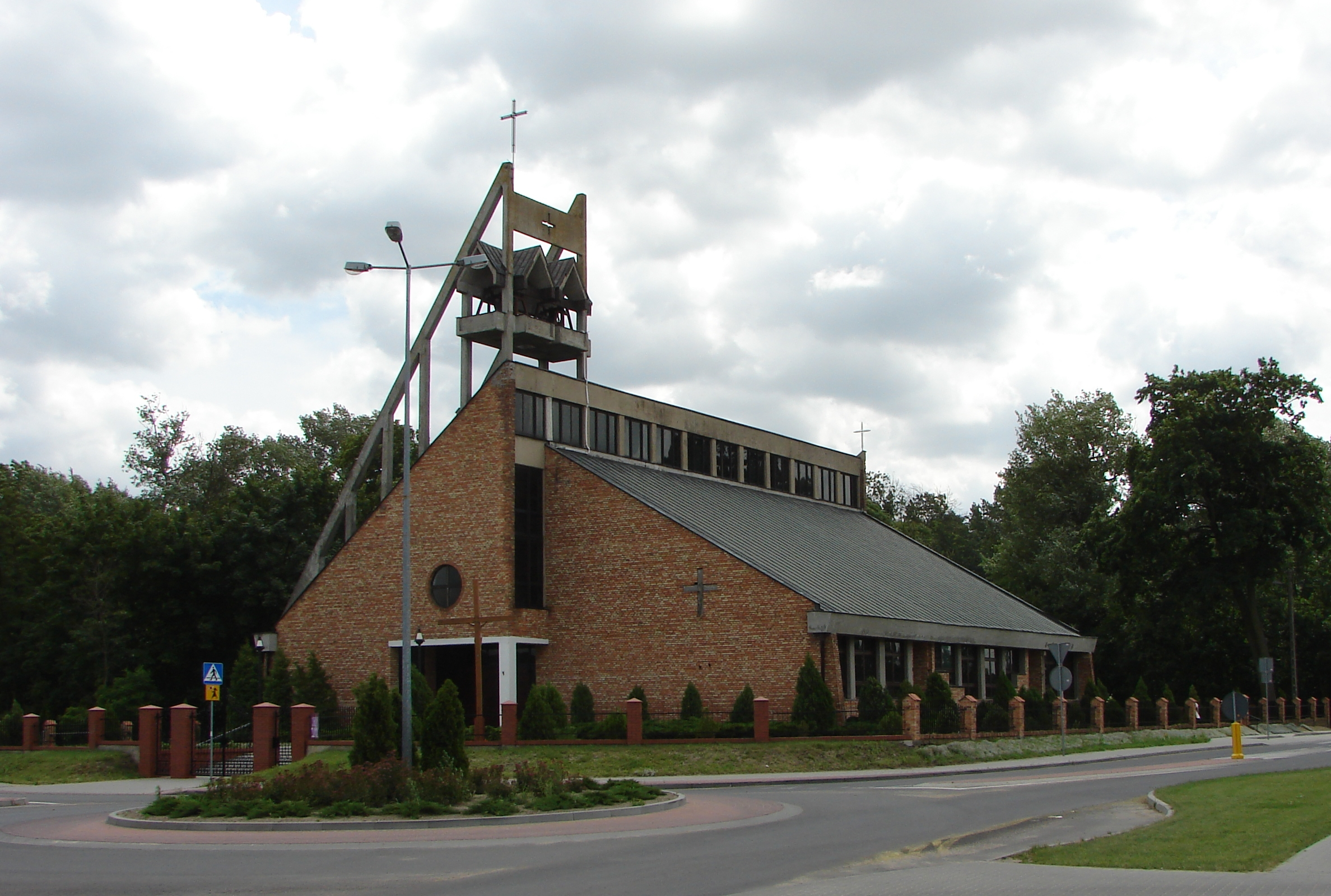
- Parish church

- Location within Poland
- Coordinates: 52°31′10″N 19°1′5″E
- Country: Poland
- Voivodeship: Kuyavian-Pomeranian
- County: Włocławek
- Gmina: Choceń

Śmiłowice [ɕmiwɔˈvit͡sɛ] is a village in the administrative district of Gmina Choceń, within Włocławek County, Kuyavian-Pomeranian Voivodeship, in north-central Poland.
