= Nowa Wola, Kuyavian-Pomeranian Voivodeship =

Nowa Wola
- Village
- Location within Poland
- Coordinates: 52°31′35″N 19°4′13″E
- Country: Poland
- Voivodeship: Kuyavian-Pomeranian
- County: Włocławek
- Gmina: Choceń
- Time zone: UTC+1 (CET)
  - Summer (DST): UTC+2 (CEST)

Nowa Wola [ˈnɔva ˈvɔla] is a village in the administrative district of Gmina Choceń, within Włocławek County, Kuyavian-Pomeranian Voivodeship, in central Poland.
