= Redecz Wielki-Wieś =

- Village
- Location within Poland
- Coordinates: 52°32′35″N 18°46′52″E
- Country: Poland
- Voivodeship: Kuyavian-Pomeranian
- County: Włocławek
- Gmina: Lubraniec
- Time zone: UTC+1 (CET)
  - Summer (DST): UTC+2 (CEST)
- Vehicle registration: CWL

Redecz Wielki-Wieś (Polish pronunciation: [ˈrɛdɛtʂ ˈfjɛlkʲi ˈvjɛɕ]) is a village in the administrative district of Gmina Lubraniec, within Włocławek County, Kuyavian-Pomeranian Voivodeship, in central Poland.
