= Janowo, Gmina Choceń =

Janowo
- Village
- Location within Poland
- Coordinates: 52°27′58″N 19°01′35″E
- Country: Poland
- Voivodeship: Kuyavian-Pomeranian
- County: Włocławek
- Gmina: Choceń

Janowo [jaˈnɔvɔ] is a village in the administrative district of Gmina Choceń. It is situated within the Włocławek County, Kuyavian-Pomeranian Voivodeship, in north-central Poland.
