= Bodzanówek, Włocławek County =

Bodzanówek
- Village
- Location within Poland
- Coordinates: 52°27′43″N 19°02′13″E
- Country: Poland
- Voivodeship: Kuyavian-Pomeranian
- County: Włocławek
- Gmina: Choceń

Bodzanówek [bɔd͡zaˈnuvɛk] is a village in the administrative district of Gmina Choceń, within Włocławek County, Kuyavian-Pomeranian Voivodeship, in north-central Poland. Its current population is around 50.

The main landmarks in Bodzanówek are a series of wind turbines, and a distribution center used to export blueberries from the region by local company OWB.
