= Choceń =

- Village
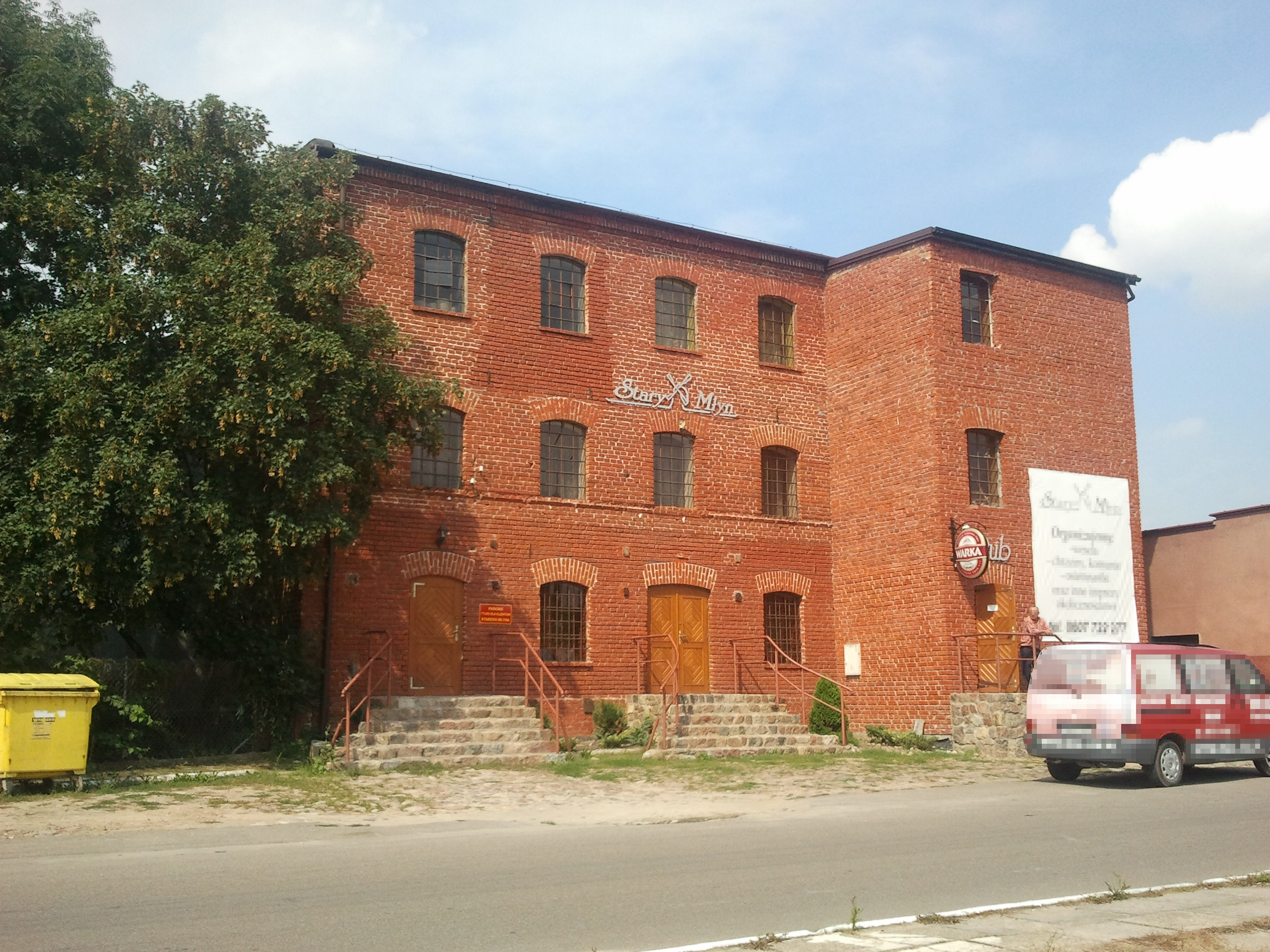
- Old Mill in Choceń

- Location within Poland
- Coordinates: 52°29′5″N 19°1′3″E
- Country: Poland
- Voivodeship: Kuyavian-Pomeranian
- County: Włocławek
- Gmina: Choceń

Population
  - Total: 980
- Postal code: 87-860
- Area code: +48 54
- Vehicle registration: CWL
- Website: http://www.chocen.pl/

Choceń [ˈxɔt͡sɛɲ] is a village in Włocławek County, Kuyavian-Pomeranian Voivodeship, in north-central Poland. It is the seat of the gmina (administrative district) called Gmina Choceń.
