= Piaski, Toruń =

District of Toruń, Poland

Piaski
- District of Toruń
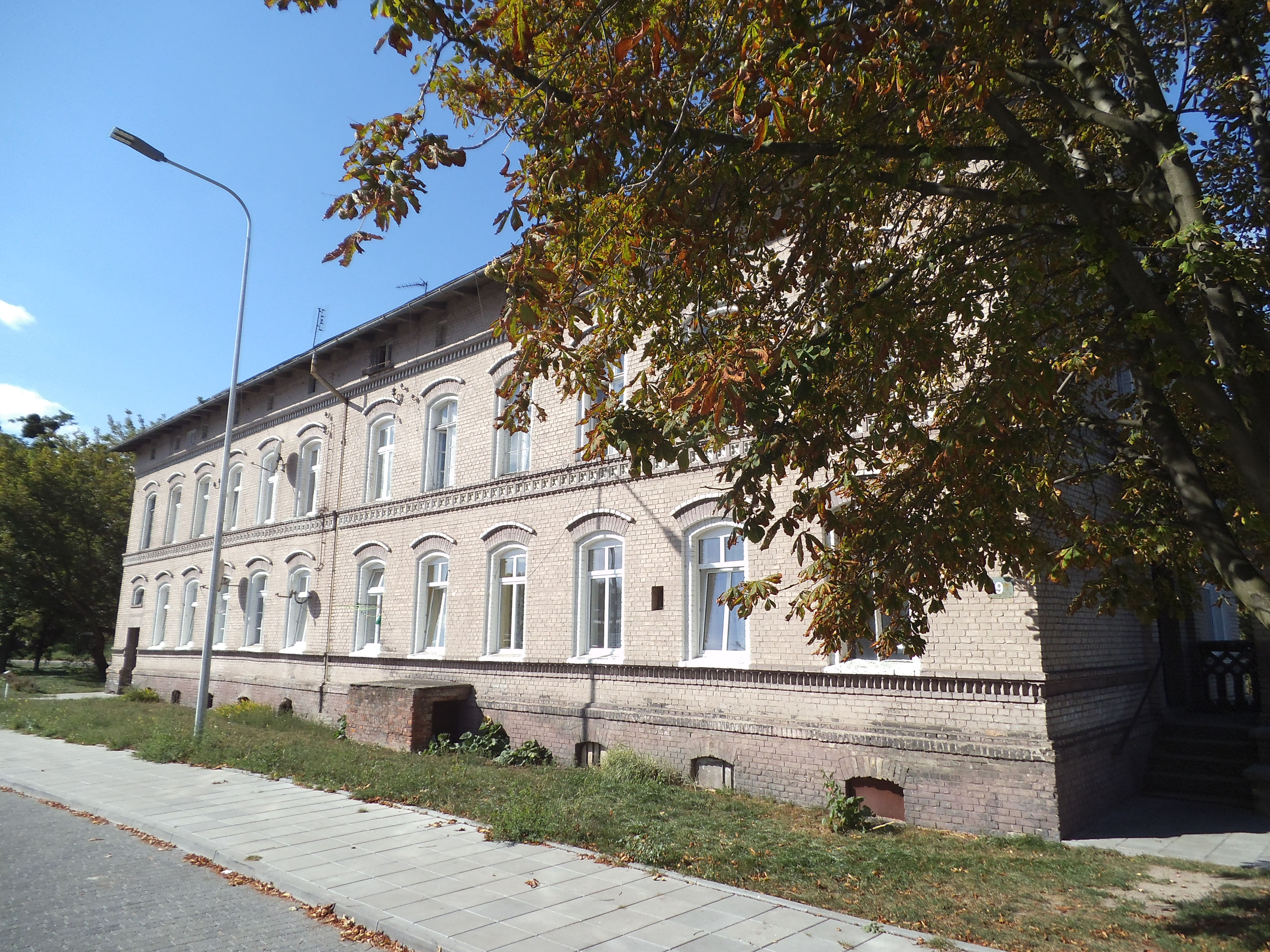

- Location of Piaski within Toruń
- Coordinates: 52°59′57″N 18°35′35″E
- Country: Poland
- Voivodeship: Kuyavian-Pomeranian
- County/City: Toruń
- Time zone: UTC+1 (CET)
  - Summer (DST): UTC+2 (CEST)
- Vehicle registration: CT

Piaski (Polish pronunciation: [ˈpjaskʲi]) is a district of Toruń, Poland, located in the southern part of the city, within its part located in the historic region of Kuyavia.

In 1934 Piaski was included within the town limits of Podgórz, which in turn was included within the city limits of Toruń in 1938.
