= Świerkowo, Kuyavian-Pomeranian Voivodeship =

Świerkowo
- Village
- Location within Poland
- Coordinates: 52°31′43″N 19°05′37″E
- Country: Poland
- Voivodeship: Kuyavian-Pomeranian
- County: Włocławek
- Gmina: Choceń

Świerkowo (Polish: [ɕfjɛrˈkɔvɔ]) is a village in the administrative district of Gmina Choceń, within Włocławek County, Kuyavian-Pomeranian Voivodeship, in north-central Poland.
