= Gmina Choceń =

Gmina Choceń Choceń Commune
- Gmina
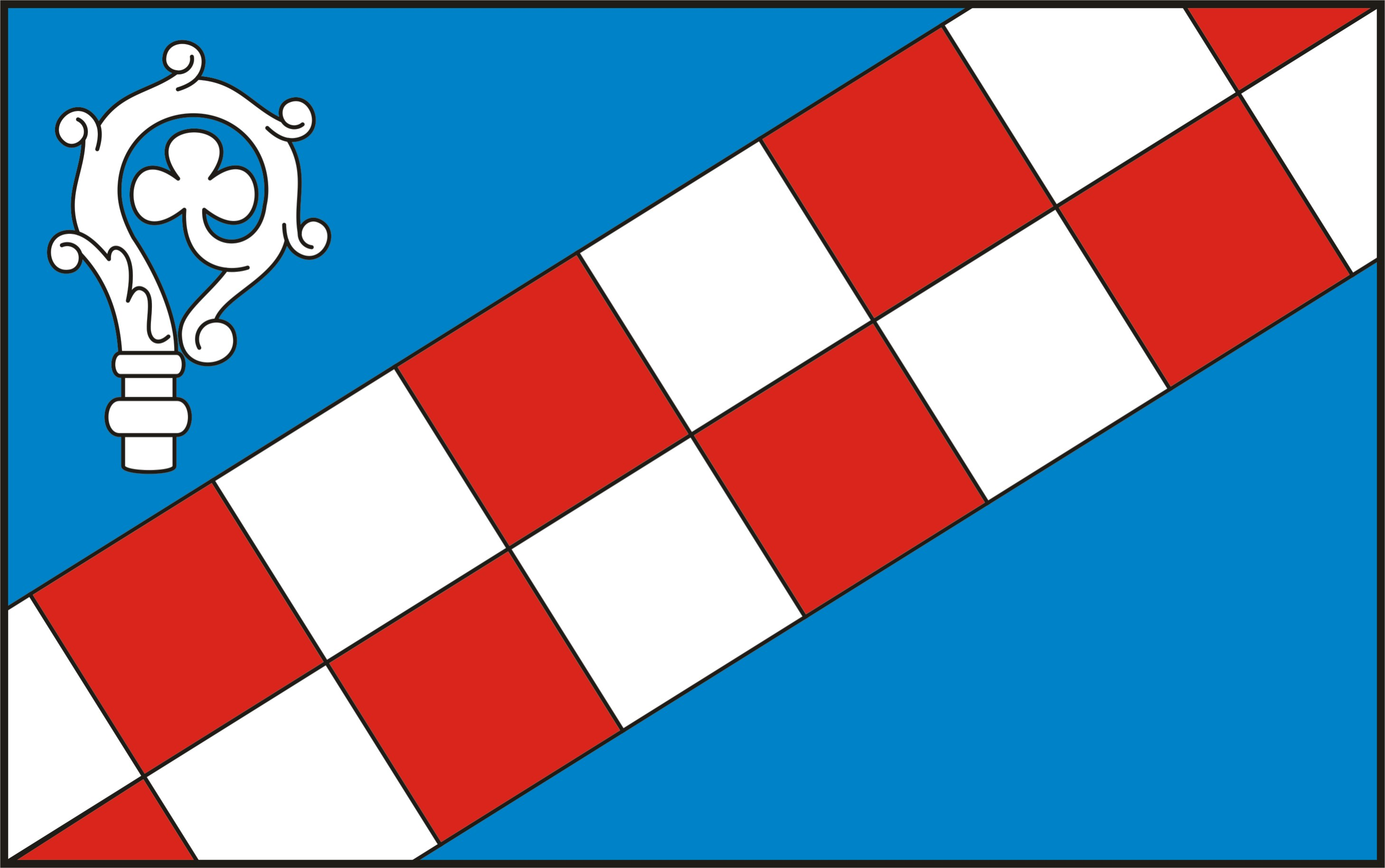
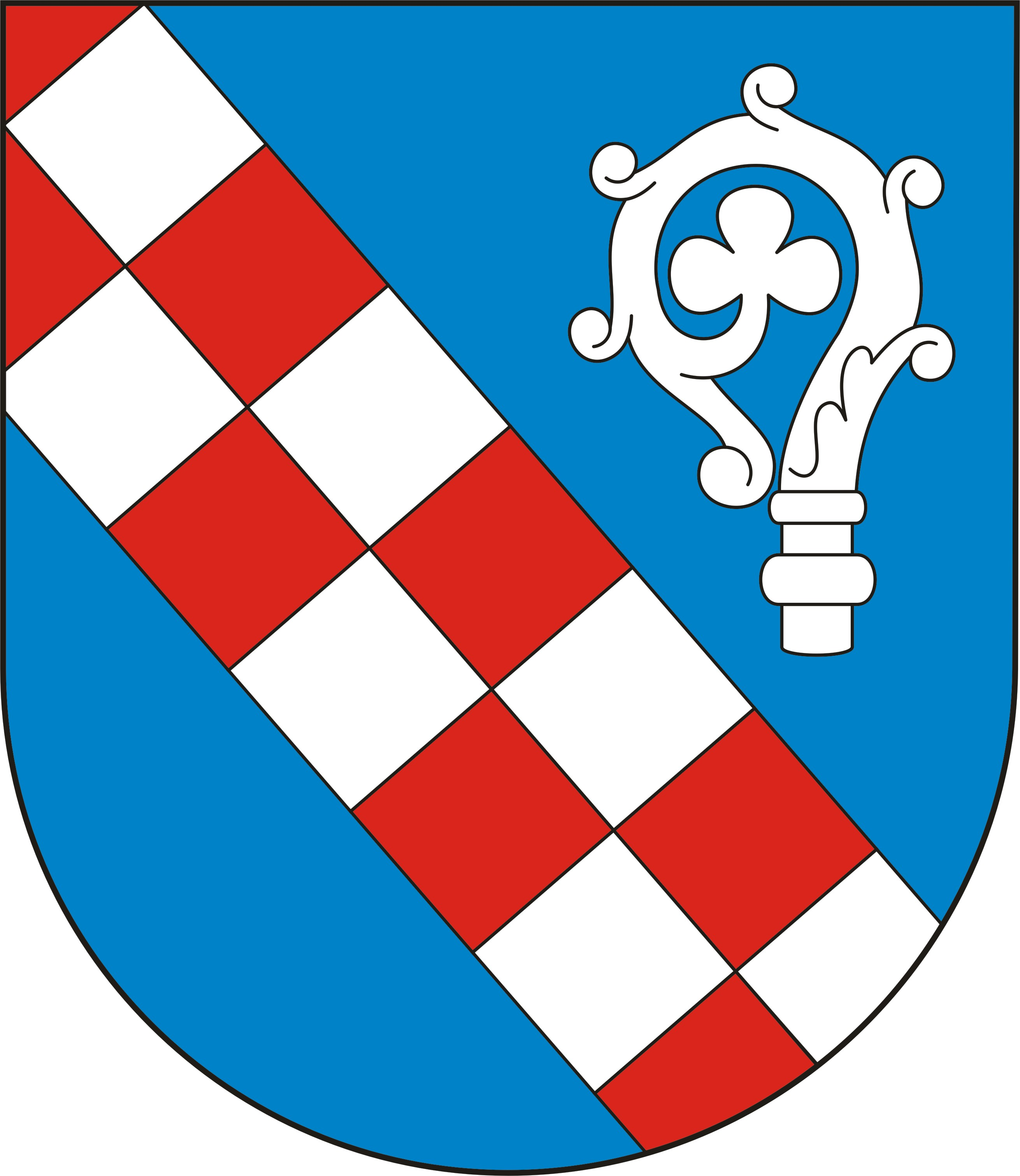
- Flag Coat of arms
- Interactive map of Gmina Choceń
- Coordinates (Choceń): 52°29′5″N 19°1′3″E
- Country: Poland
- Voivodeship: Kuyavian-Pomeranian
- County: Włocławek County
- Seat: Choceń

Area
  - Total: 99.68 km^{2} (38.49 sq mi)

Population (2006)
  - Total: 7,894
  - Density: 79.19/km^{2} (205.1/sq mi)
- Time zone: UTC+1 (CET)
  - Summer (DST): UTC+2 (CEST)
- Vehicle registration: CWL
- Website: http://www.chocen.pl/

Gmina Choceń is a rural gmina (administrative district) in Włocławek County, Kuyavian-Pomeranian Voivodeship, in central Poland. Its seat is the village of Choceń, which lies approximately 19 kilometres (12 mi) south of Włocławek and 67 km (42 mi) south-east of Toruń.

The gmina covers an area of 99.68 square kilometres (38.5 sq mi), and as of 2006 its total population is 7,894.

== Villages ==
Gmina Choceń contains the villages and settlements of Bodzanówek, Bodzanowo, Borzymie, Borzymowice, Choceń, Czerniewice, Filipki, Gajówka, Grabówka, Janowo, Jarantowice, Jerzewo, Kępka Szlachecka (part), Krukowo, Kuźnice, Lijewo, Łopatki, Ługowiska, Lutobórz, Niemojewo, Nowa Wola, Olganowo, Pustki Śmiłowskie, Skibice, Śmiłowice, Stare Nakonowo, Stefanowo, Świerkowo, Szatki, Szczutkowo, Szczytno, Wichrowice, Wilkowice, Wilkowiczki, Wola Nakonowska, Ząbin, Zakrzewek and Zapust.

== Neighbouring gminas ==
Gmina Choceń is bordered by the gminas of Boniewo, Chodecz, Kowal, Lubień Kujawski, Lubraniec and Włocławek.
