= Bodzanowo, Gmina Choceń =

Bodzanowo
- Village
- Location within Poland
- Coordinates: 52°28′00″N 19°03′23″E
- Country: Poland
- Voivodeship: Kuyavian-Pomeranian
- County: Włocławek
- Gmina: Choceń

Bodzanowo [bɔd͡zaˈnɔvɔ] is a village in the administrative district of Gmina Choceń, within Włocławek County, Kuyavian-Pomeranian Voivodeship, in north-central Poland.
