= Skibice, Kuyavian-Pomeranian Voivodeship =

Skibice
- Village
- Location within Poland
- Coordinates: 52°32′30″N 18°59′28″E
- Country: Poland
- Voivodeship: Kuyavian-Pomeranian
- County: Włocławek
- Gmina: Choceń

Skibice [skiˈbit͡sɛ] is a village in the administrative district of Gmina Choceń, within Włocławek County, Kuyavian-Pomeranian Voivodeship, in central Poland.

Five Polish citizens were murdered by Nazi Germany in the village during World War II.
