= Chocenice =

- Municipality
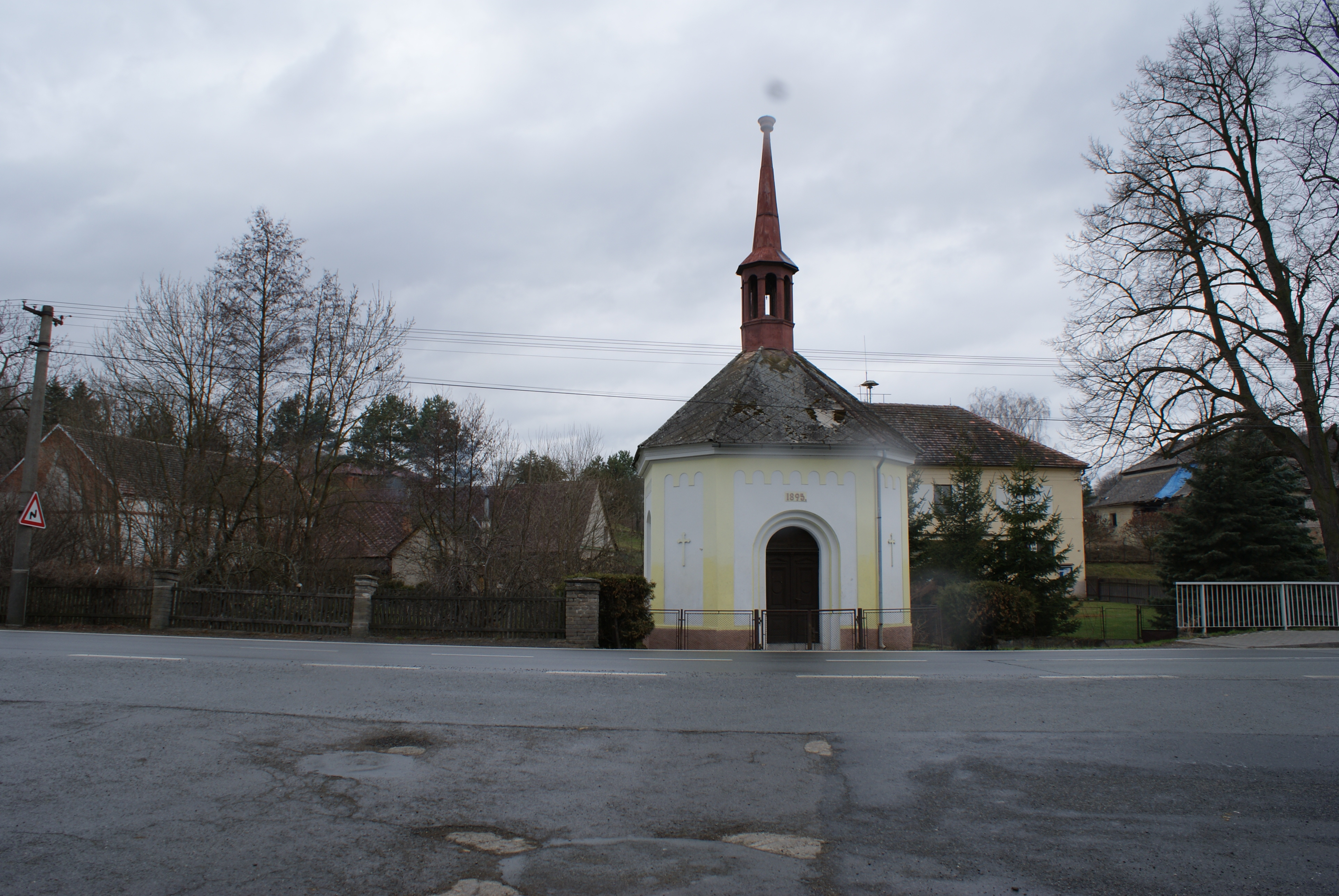
- Chapel of the Virgin Mary at the main road

- Location in the Czech Republic
- Coordinates: 49°32′51″N 13°31′12″E
- Country: Czech Republic
- Region: Plzeň
- District: Plzeň-South
- First mentioned: 1115

Area
  - Total: 13.18 km^{2} (5.09 sq mi)
- Elevation: 413 m (1,355 ft)

Population (2026-01-01)
  - Total: 650
  - Density: 49/km^{2} (130/sq mi)
- Time zone: UTC+1 (CET)
  - Summer (DST): UTC+2 (CEST)
- Postal codes: 335 01, 336 01
- Website: www.chocenice.cz

Chocenice is a municipality and village in Plzeň-South District in the Plzeň Region of the Czech Republic. It has about 700 inhabitants.

Chocenice lies approximately 25 kilometres (16 mi) south-east of Plzeň and 89 kilometres (55 mi) south-west of Prague.

== Administrative division ==
Chocenice consists of four municipal parts (in brackets population according to the 2021 census):

- Chocenice (420)
- Chocenická Lhota (68)
- Kotousov (31)
- Zhůř (61)

== Demographics ==
Historical population
Year	Pop.	±%
1869	920	—
1880	943	+2.5%
1890	844	−10.5%
1900	839	−0.6%
1910	869	+3.6%
1921	863	−0.7%
1930	880	+2.0%
1950	684	−22.3%
1961	626	−8.5%
1970	563	−10.1%
1980	583	+3.6%
1991	532	−8.7%
2001	520	−2.3%
2011	573	+10.2%
2021	580	+1.2%
Source: Censuses
