= Kasia =

Kasia ([ˈkaɕa]) is a Polish diminutive form of given name, a shortened version of the name Katarzyna.

== Notable people ==
- Kasia Cerekwicka (born 1980), singer
- Kasia Domanska (born 1972), painter
- Kasia Haddad (born 1979), British actress
- Kasia Kowalska (born 1973), singer
- Kasia Kulesza (born 1976), Canadian Olympic medallist in synchronized swimming
- Kasia Madera (born 1974), British television news presenter at the BBC
- Kasia Miednik (born 1995), singer
- Kasia Niewiadoma (born 1994), cyclist
- Kasia Nosowska (born 1971), singer
- Kasia Popowska (born 1989), singer
- Kasia Selwand, curling player
- Kasia Smutniak (born 1979), actress
- Kasia Stankiewicz (born 1977), singer
- Kasia Struss (born 1987), model
- Kasia Al Thani (born 1976), third wife of Sheikh Abdulaziz Khalifa Al Thani
- Kasia Vuorinen (born 1988), social media celebrity and businesswomen
- Kasia Wilk (born 1982), singer

Fictional characters

- Kasia, character in Uprooted by Naomi Novik

Kasia may also refer to:

- Kushinagar, Uttar Pradesh – Kasia is the nearest town to the holy place, Kushinagar
- Kasia i Tomek, Polish title of Un gars, une fille
- Kasia 100/170 mine, Polish anti vehicle mines
- Kassia (fl. 9th-century), Byzantine abbess, poet, and hymnographer
- Adam kasia, or the "hidden Adam" in Mandaeism
- Zihrun Raza Kasia ("Zihrun the Hidden Mystery"), a Mandaean text

== See also ==
- Katarzyna (disambiguation)
