= Kozy (disambiguation) =

Kozy is an urban area in Silesian Voivodeship in southern Poland.

Kozy may also refer to:

- Kozy, Kuyavian-Pomeranian Voivodeship (north-central Poland)
- Kozy, Pomeranian Voivodeship (north Poland)
- Kozy, Gmina Lipnica in Pomeranian Voivodeship (north Poland)
- Kozy, West Pomeranian Voivodeship (north-west Poland)
