= Slavianski Bazaar in Vitebsk =

Annual music festival in Vitebsk, Belarus

Slavic Bazaar in Vitebsk
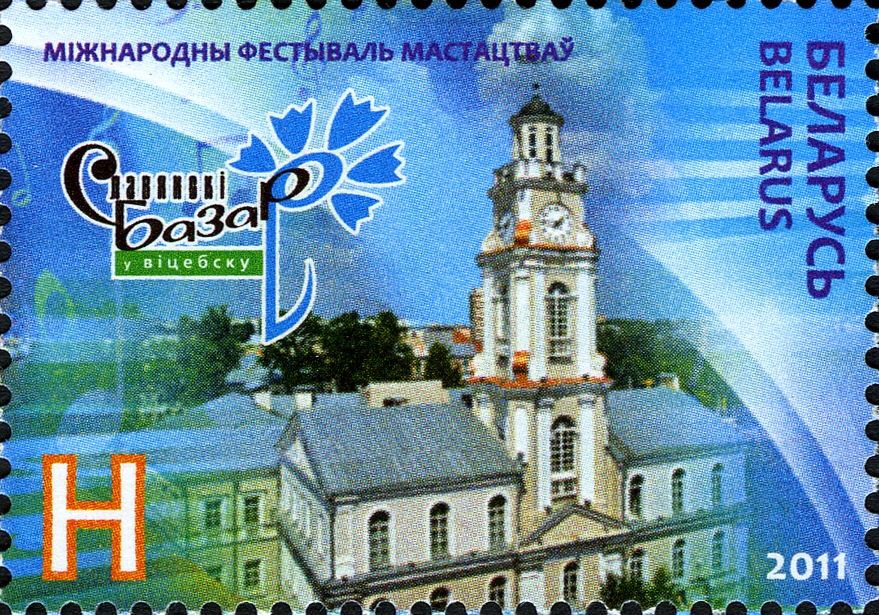
- 2011 stamp of Belarus
- Genre: Folk, pop, folk-rock
- Locations: Vitebsk, Belarus
- Years active: 18 July 1992 – present
- Founders: Belarusian Government

The International Festival of Arts "Slavianski Bazaar in Vitebsk", (Note: Belarusian: Міжнародны фестываль мастацтваў «Славянскі базар у Віцебску», romanized: Mižnarodny fiestyvaĺ mastactvaŭ "Slavianski bazar u Vitsiebsku"; Ukrainian: Міжнародний фестиваль мистецтв «Слов'янський базар у Вітебську», romanized: Mizhnarodnyi festyval mystetstv "Slovianskyi bazar u Vitebsku"; Russian: Международный фестиваль искусств "Славянский базар в Витебске", romanized: Mezhdunarodnyy festival' iskusstv "Slavyanskiy bazar v Vitebske".) also known as Slavic Bazaar, is an annual festival held in Vitebsk, Belarus, under the auspices of the Belarusian Government since 1992. Its main program is devoted to Slavic music. The majority of participants are artists from Slavic nations but there are also many non-Slavic guests, mostly from the countries of the former Eastern Bloc, Soviet Union and Yugoslavia.

A vocal competition is taking place within the framework of the festival. There is also a children's music competition. A special award "Through Art – to Peace and Understanding" is awarded at the festival; the names of the award winners are immortalized on the "Square of Stars" in Vitebsk.

Famous musicians and performers from around the world performed at the festival as headliners, including Michael Bolton, Alla Pugacheva, Thomas Anders, Sumi Jo, Alessandro Safína, Patricia Kaas, Lou Bega, Maryla Rodowicz, Valery Leontiev, Svetlana Loboda, Bosson and others.

== History ==
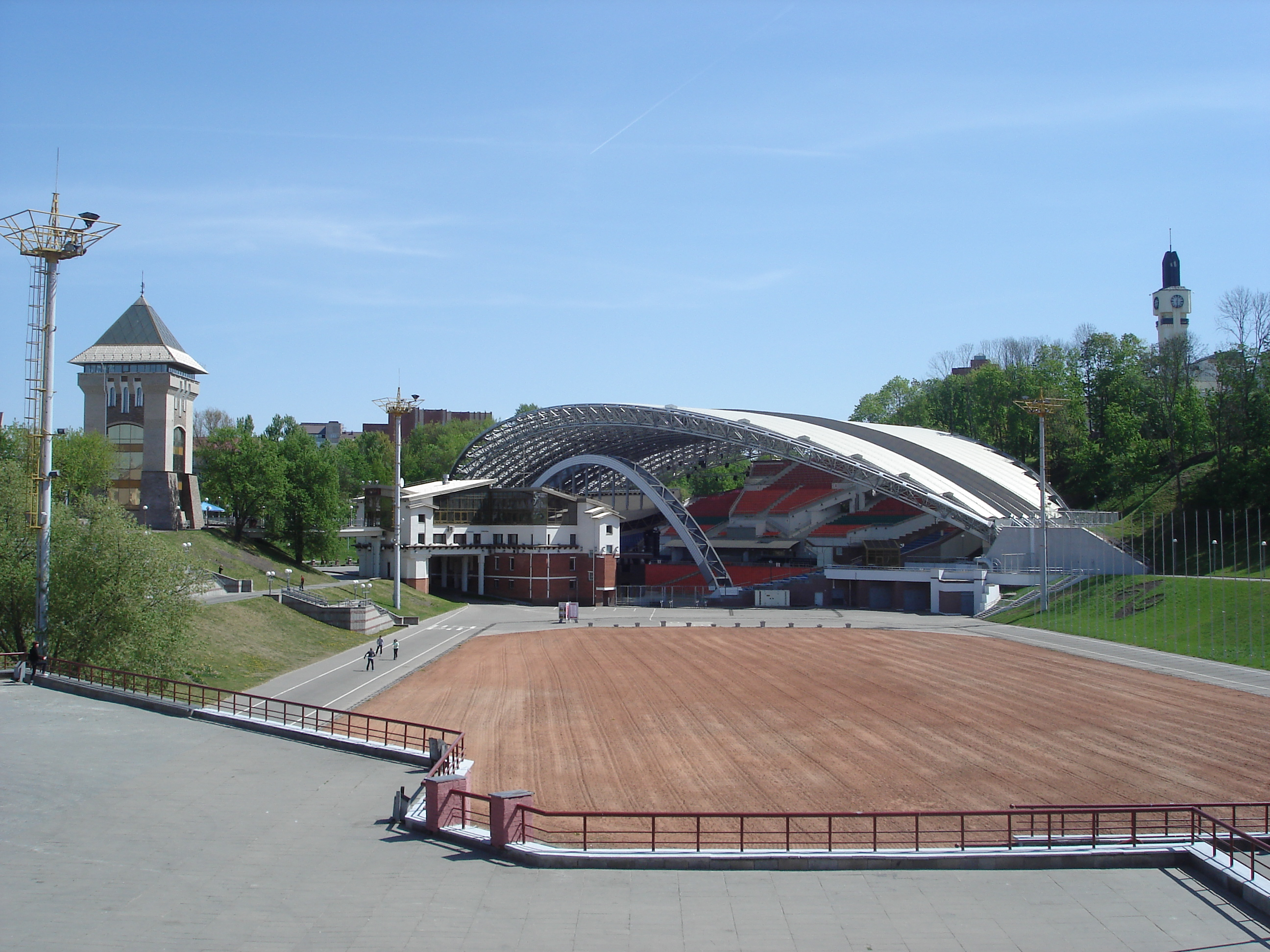
Amphitheatre in Vitebsk

The predecessor of the festival was the "Polish Song Festival in Vitebsk" (Polish: Festiwal Piosenki Polskiej w Witebsku). Vitebsk was chosen to host the festival according to the agreements with Polish city Zielona Góra where the "Soviet Song Festival" (Polish: Festiwal Piosenki Radzieckiej) was held since 1965. The main venue of the present-day festival, the Amphitheatre, was constructed especially for such occasion in 1988.

Only two editions of the "Polish Song Festival in Vitebsk" were held: in 1988 and 1990. After the Dissolution of the Soviet Union the artificial ties between the former eastern bloc countries have broken. So there emerged an idea to organize a cultural arrangement in order to show the cultural diversity of Slavic nations. The first Slavianski Bazaar was opened on 18 July 1992. It was organized by the Belarusian Government with the financial support from Russia and Ukraine. The main goal of the very first festival was an attempt to acquaint the Belarusian audience with pop and folk trends from Slavic countries.

In 1993 the festival became a member of the International Federation of Festival Organizations (FIDOF).

The festival was awarded the diploma 'FIDOF Festival of the Year 2000' "for impeccable quality of organization, professionalism, hospitality, and promotion of noble humanistic aims on the international level".

Due to Belarus's involvement in the 2022 invasion of Ukraine, many countries have limited their participation in the festival. The last time a Polish representative participated was in 2021.

== The contest ==
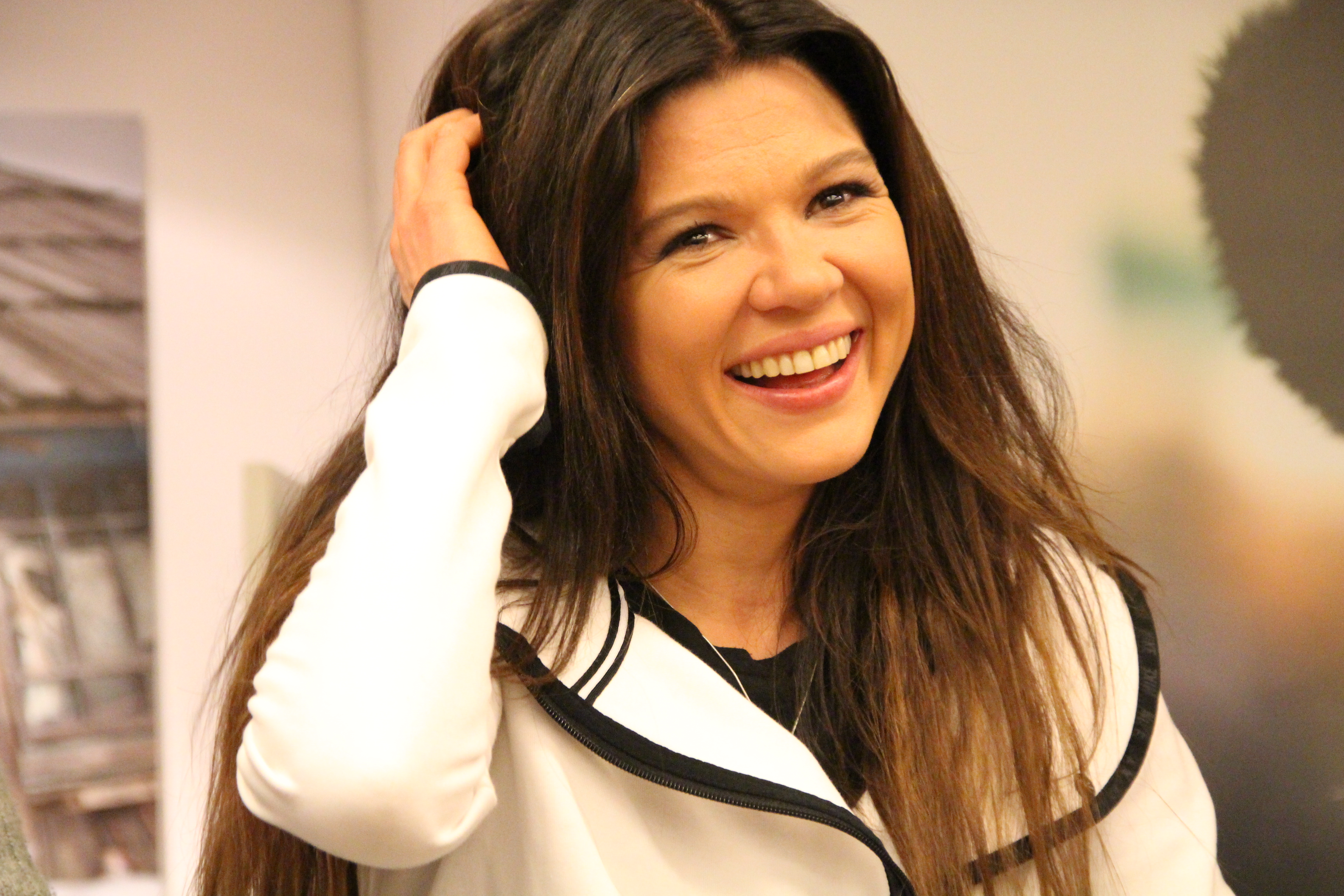
Ruslana the most successful winner of the Contest

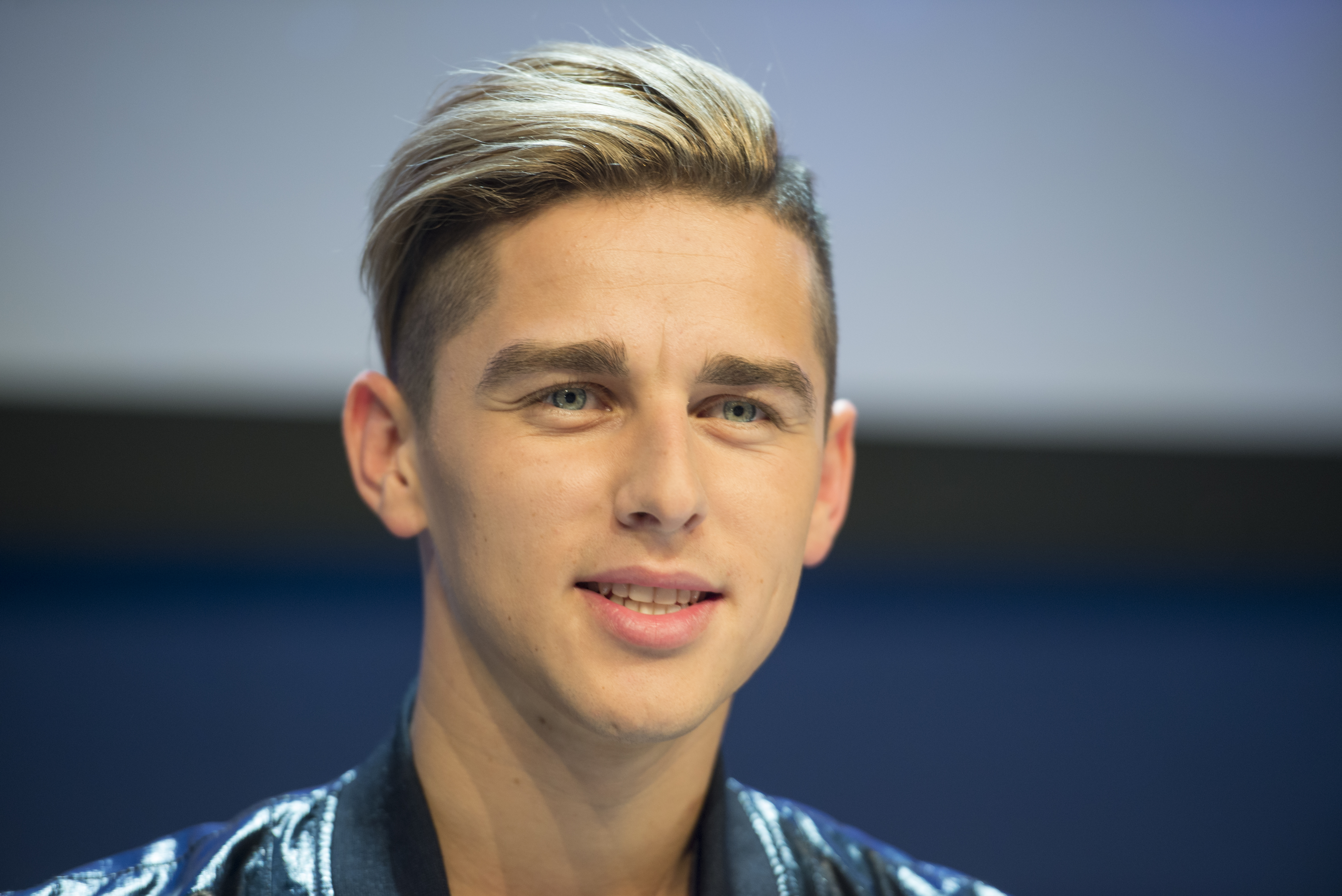
Donny Montell, winner in 2008

During the festival, two international competitions are held: for the adult singers and for the young singers (since 2003). It has two stages, each held on a separate day. On the first day, the contestants should perform the song in a national language of the country the contestant represents. All vocals are sung live using backing track. On the second day, the contestants perform the song written by a composer from any Slavic country in any of the Slavic languages.

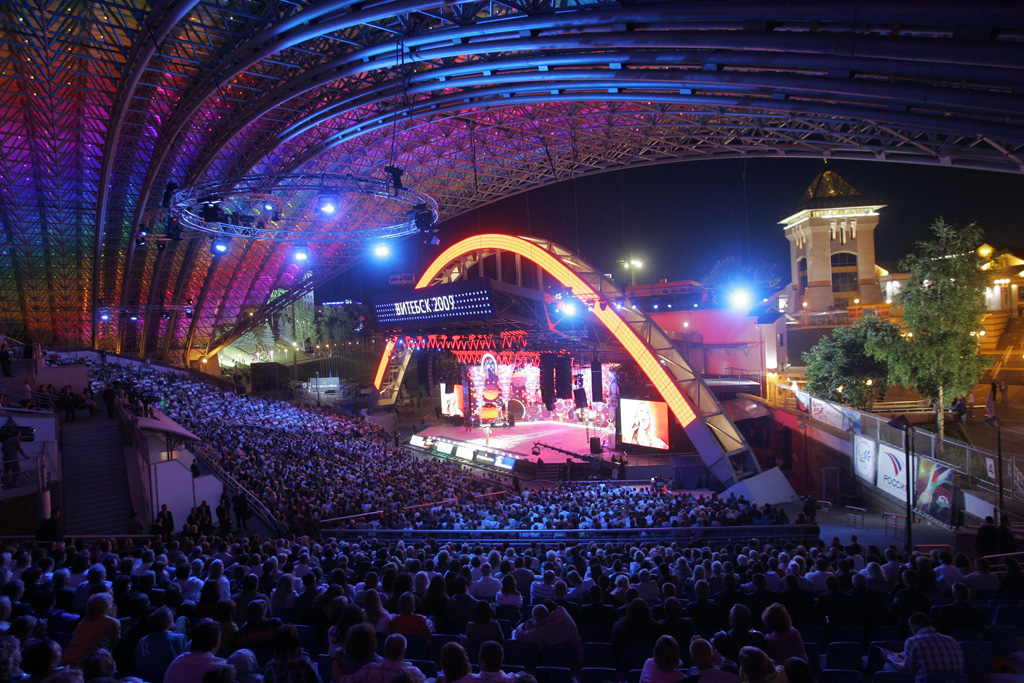
The 18th International Art Festival Slavyansky Bazar opening ceremony. 2009

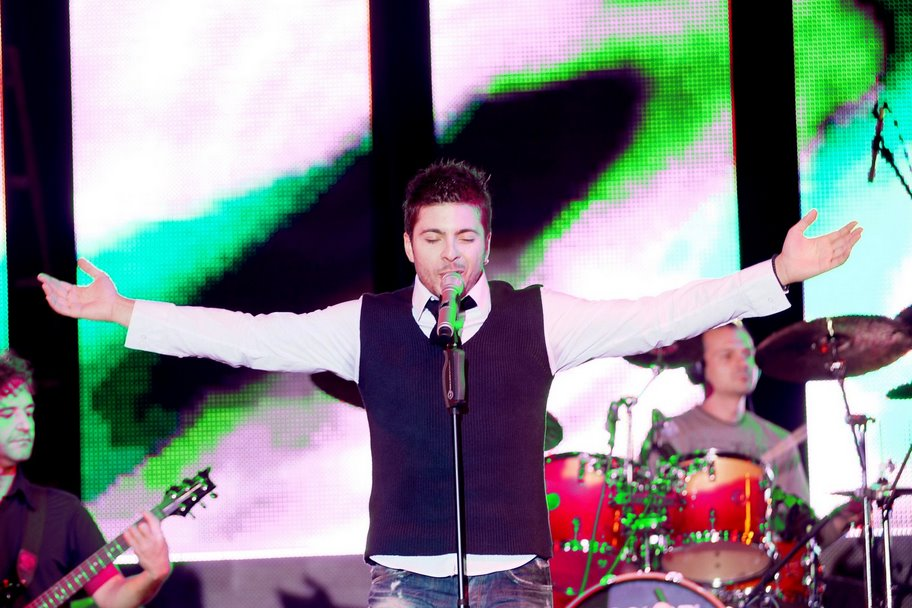
Toše Proeski, the Macedonian superstar won the festival in 2000

The awards include Grand Prix, as well, as the first, second, and third prizes.

Adult Grand Prix winners
Year	Country	Performer
1992	Ukraine	Oleksa Berest
1993	Ukraine	Taisia Povaliy
1994	FR Yugoslavia	Milan Šćepović - Šćepa
1995	FR Yugoslavia	Filip Žmaher
1996	Ukraine	Ruslana
1997	FR Yugoslavia	Svetlana Slavković
1998	Israel	Rafael Dahan
1999	FR Yugoslavia	Željko Joksimović
2000	Macedonia	Toše Proeski
2001	Russia	Theona Dolnikova
2002	FR Yugoslavia	Milovan Zimonjić
2003	Belarus	Maxim Sapatskov
2004	Belarus	Pyotr Elfimov
2005	Belarus	Polina Smolova
2006	Russia	Oksana Bogoslovskaya
2007	Ukraine	Natalya Krasnyanskaya
2008	Lithuania	Donny Montell
2009	Russia	Dmitry Danilenko
2010	Croatia	Damir Kedžo
2011	Belarus	Alyona Lanskaya
2012	Macedonia	Bobi Mojsovski
2013	Poland	Michał Kaczmarek
2014	Mexico	Rodrigo de la Cadena
2015	Kazakhstan	Dimash Kudaibergen
2016	Belarus	Alexey Gross
2017	Ukraine	Vlad Sytnik
2018	Romania	Marcel Roșca
2019	Kazakhstan	Ädilxan Makïn
2020	Belarus	Roman Voloznev
2021	Kazakhstan	Rukhiya Baydukenova
2022	Belarus	Anna Trubetskaya
2023	Armenia	Masha Mnjoyan
2024	Moldova	Carolina Bălan
2025	Kazakhstan	Almagul Battalieva
2026	Italy	Soraya

== Children's contest winners ==
The children's contest during the festival in Vitebsk was first held in 2003, an expansion of the cultural and artistic diversity of the event. It has become one of the mainstay events in the Eurasian Region (North Asia, Eastern Europe, Central Asia) for child performers making their way to Junior Eurovision Song Contest.

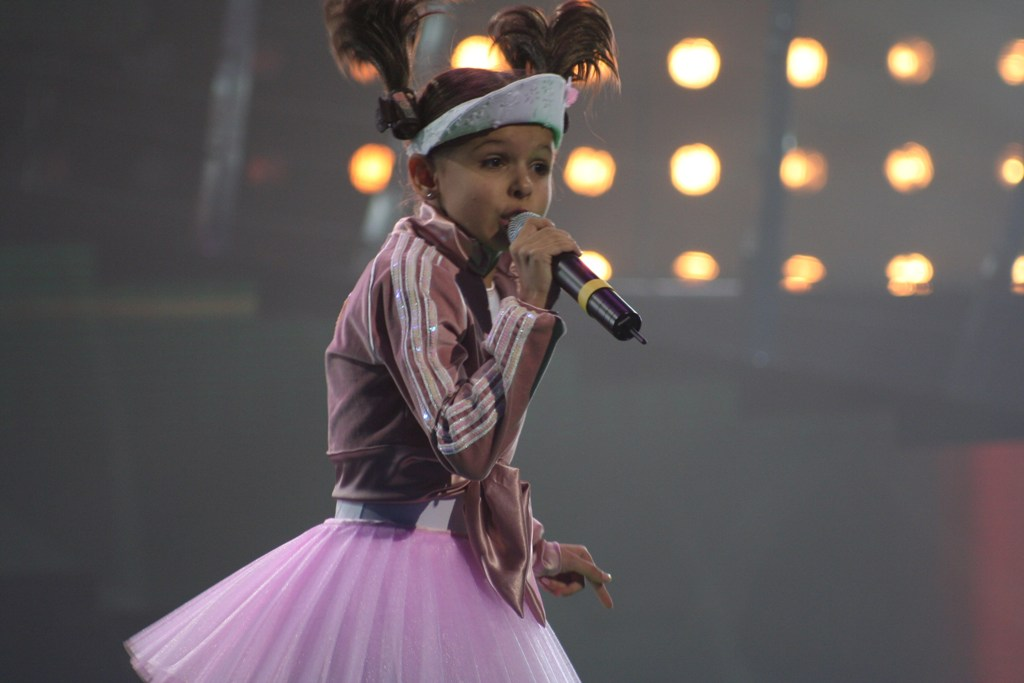
Ksenia Sitnik's victory in Vicebsk lead her to the triumph in the Junior Eurovision Song Contest 2005

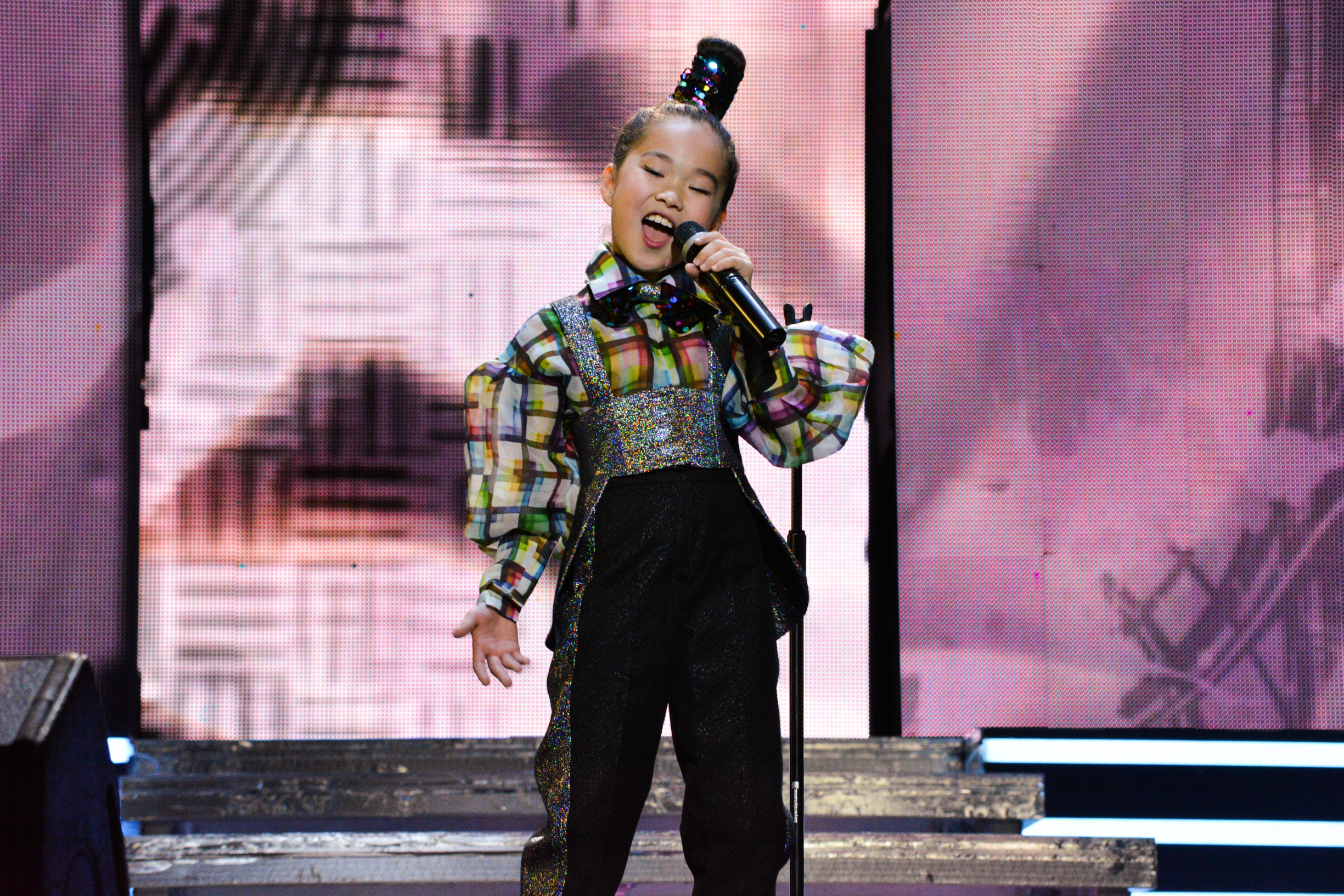
Luisa Nurkuatova. Grand Prix of Slavianski Bazaar 2015

Year	Country	Performer
2003	Romania	Noni Răzvan Ene
2004	Russia	Roman Grechushnikov
2005	Belarus	Ksenia Sitnik
2006	Poland	Katarzyna Miednik
2007	Belarus	Andrey Kunets
2008	Russia	Luara Hayrapetyan
2009	Romania	Maria Cristina Crăciun
2010	Romania	Mario Galatanu
2011	Romania	Raluca-Elena Ursu
2012	Georgia	Mariam Bichoshvili
2013	Bulgaria	Presijana Dimitrova
2014	Ukraine	Anastasiya Baginska
2015	Kazakhstan	Luisa Nurkuatova
2016	Russia	Anastasiya Gladilina
2017	Belarus	Marija Mаhilnaja
2018	Ukraine	Oleksandr Balabanov
2019	Belarus	Ksenia Haletskaja
2020	Belarus	Angelina Lаmaka
2021	Montenegro	Komnen Vuković
2022	Belarus	Elisey Kasich
2023	Kazakhstan	Şerxan Arıstan
2024	Uzbekistan	Yasmina Xusniddinova
2025	Belarus	Amaliya Sukhan
2026	Belarus	Lizaveta Tsuprik
