= Higinio =

Higinio is a given name. Notable people with the name include:

- Higinio Anglés (1888–1969), Spanish musicologist
- Higinio Carrocera Mortera
- Higinio Cazón (1866–1914), musician and Songwriter
- Higinio Marín Escavy (born 1993), Spanish footballer
- Higinio García Fernández (1956–2017), Spanish footballer
- Higinio Fernández (born 1988), Spanish racing cyclist riding for Team Ecuador
- Higinio Chávez García (born 1959), Mexican politician affiliated with the Party of the Democratic Revolution
- José Higinio Gómez González (1932–2008), Spanish Roman Catholic bishop
- Higinio Moríñigo (1897–1983), general and political figure in Paraguay
- Higinio Ochoa
- Higinio Ortúzar (1915–1982), retired Chilean footballer
- Higinio Ruvalcaba (1905–1976), Mexican violinist and composer
- Higinio Uriarte (1843–1909), Paraguayan politician and President from 1877 to 1878
- Higinio Vélez (1947–2021), Cuban baseball manager

== See also ==
- General Higinio Morínigo, town in the Caazapá department of Paraguay
- Higieniewo
