= Bycz =

Bycz may refer to the following places in Poland:

- Bycz, Kuyavian-Pomeranian Voivodeship
- Bycz, Lubusz Voivodeship
