= Iza Moszczeńska =

Polish feminist journalist and suffragette

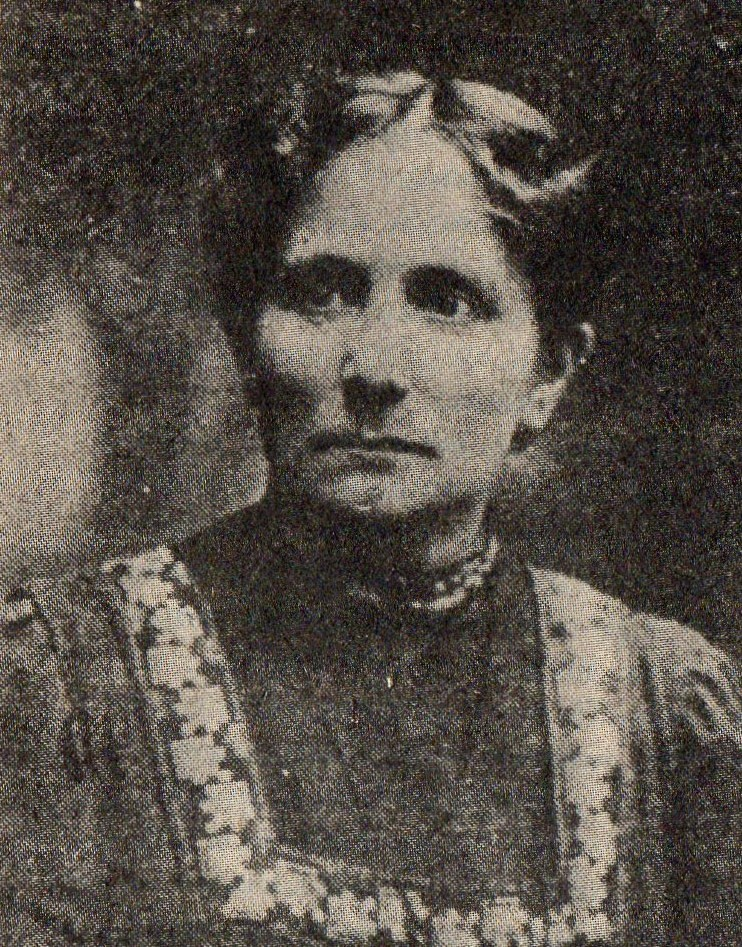
- Born: 28 October 1864; Rzeczyca, Kingdom of Prussia (now Poland)
- Died: 20 March 1941 (aged 76); Warsaw, Poland
- Other names: Izabela Moszczeńska-Rzepecka
- Occupations: Feminist, journalist, translator, and suffragette
- Spouse: Kazimierz Rzepecki

Izabela (Iza) Moszczeńska or Moszczeńska-Rzepecka (28 October 1864 – 20 March 1941) was a Polish feminist journalist, translator and suffragette. She was the first Polish author to advocate sex education for both girls and boys.

== Life ==
Iza Moszczeńska was born on the family estate in Rzeczyca, Kingdom of Prussia (now Rzeczyca, Poland) on 28 October 1864. She was mostly educated at home, only receiving two years of formal schooling, although she gained fluency in English, French and German in addition to Polish. Before 1890 she taught the local children and began writing articles for various newspapers and magazines. During this time she visited Warsaw, the capital of Russian-controlled Congress Poland, to attend lectures at the Flying University (Polish: Uniwersytet Latający), a covert school for women who were forbidden to university by the Russians. Her father died in 1890 and the family estate had to be sold off so Moszczeńska and her mother moved to Warsaw where they started a secret girl's boarding school. She married Kazimierz Rzepecki, editor of the newspaper Great Poland Courier (Polish: Goniec Wielkopolski) in 1894 and moved to Prussian-controlled Poznań where she was co-editor of the newspaper. They moved to Lviv, in the Kingdom of Galicia and Lodomeria of the Austro-Hungarian Empire in 1897 where she wrote for the local newspapers before moving to Warsaw the following year. Her husband died in 1902 and Moszczeńska translated books by William James and Ellen Key in addition to writing articles that appeared in numerous newspapers and literary magazines such as Życie. She worked for the Warsaw Courier (Polish: Kurier Warszawski) from 1926 to 1939 and served on the Warsaw City Council from 1927 to 1934. After suffering two strokes in 1934 and 1937, she died in Warsaw on 20 March 1941.

== Activities ==
While living in Poznań, Moszczeńska began participating in the activities of local women's organizations, much to the displeasure of her husband's family.
