= Rogalin (disambiguation) =

MS Aallotar, a ship who frequently bore name MS Rogalin

Rogalin may also refer to the following places in Poland:

- Rogalin, a village and landscape park near Poznań
- Rogalin, Radziejów County in Kuyavian-Pomeranian Voivodeship (north-central Poland)
- Rogalin, Sępólno County in Kuyavian-Pomeranian Voivodeship (north-central Poland)
- Rogalin, Lublin Voivodeship (east Poland)
