= Jadwiga Golcz =

Polish photographer

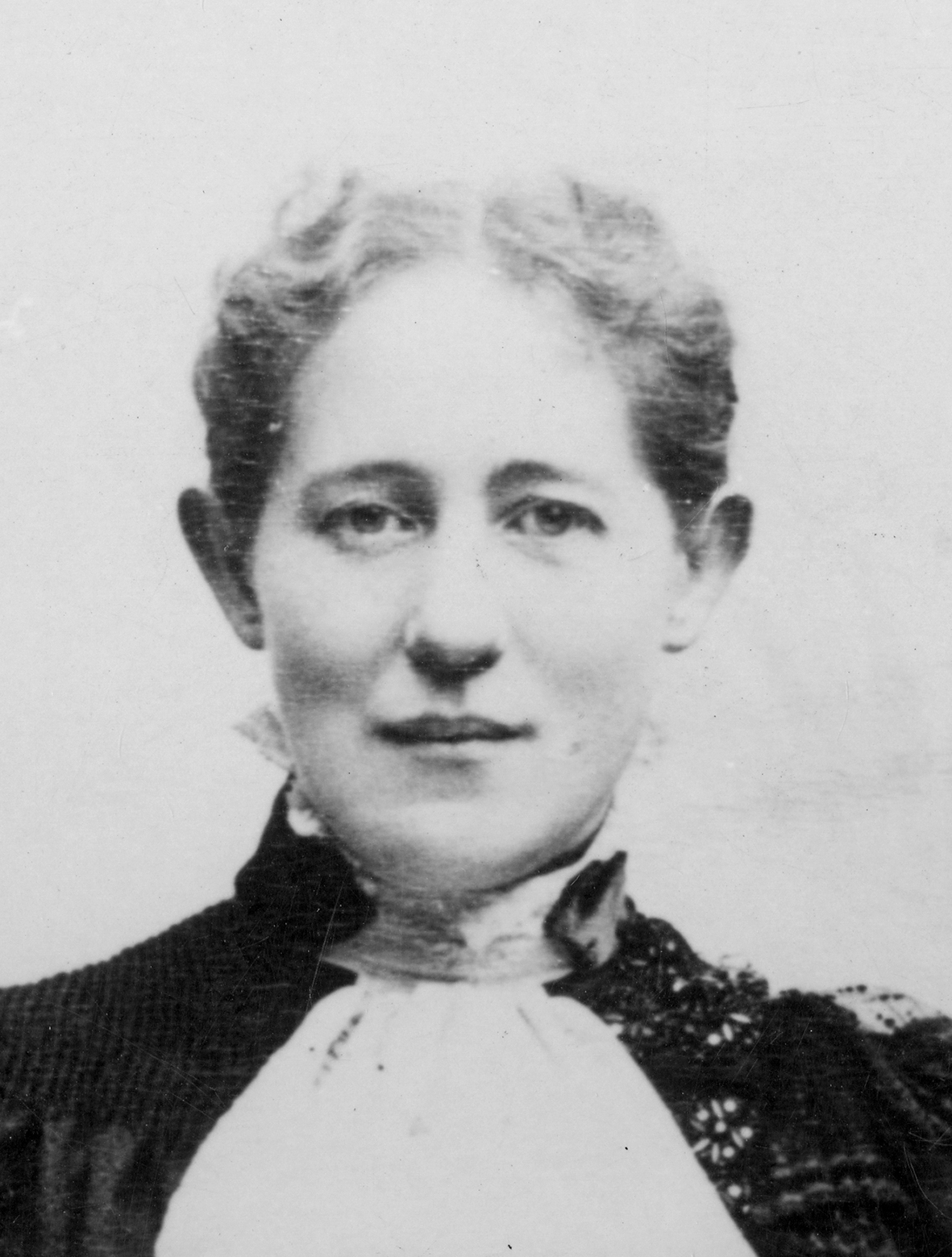
- Born: August 13, 1866
- Died: 1936
- Known for: Photography

Jadwiga Irena Golcz (1866–1936) was a Polish photographer, one of the pioneering women of the medium in Poland. Golcz owned a studio in Warsaw and took portraits of leading Polish artists.

== Early life and education ==
Jadwiga Golcz was born on 13 August 1866 in Gradowo, to a wealthy family of Polish landed gentry. She took an interest in photography in Wojciech Gerson's painting studio and went to Vienna, Paris and Berlin to study the medium.

== Career ==
Golcz took portraits and open-air photographs, as well as pictures documenting works of art. She was the first woman photographer to have her works published in the Polish press; her photographs appearing in Wędrowiec and Tygodnik Illustrowany. In the latter, she started the first photography competition of the weekly. With her press photography, Golcz documented the life of the Warsaw elite.

She was among the few Polish women of the time to open her own atelier. From the mid-1890s, she ran her own photography studio in Warsaw, first located at Erywańska Street, then moved to Hotel Bristol. Her atelier was frequented by many well-known artists, such as Ignacy Jan Paderewski or Bolesław Prus. She also took portraits of, among others, Henryk Sienkiewicz, Ferdynand Ruszczyc or Henryk Siemiradzki.

In 1899, a company Golcz ran with Szalay played a role in creating the first distribution networks of foreign films in Warsaw and Łódź. Two years later, Golcz ran the first exhibition of film and cinematic equipment in Warsaw.

Golcz initiated and published a photography magazine called Światło and was among the founders of an association of photographers in Warsaw (Towarzystwo Fotograficzne w Warszawie). In 1907, together with priest Włodzimierz Kirchner, she cofounded a photography school in Warsaw which was attended mainly by women. Due to the incompetence of Kirchner, Golcz was eventually forced to close the school, after sinking all of her savings into the endeavour. The event led to her gradual withdrawal from public life.

== Death ==
Golcz died forgotten, in 1936.

== Collections ==
Photographs taken by Jadwiga Golcz can be found in the collections of the National Museum of Warsaw, the National Library of Poland, Museum of Warsaw and Museum of Art in Łódź.
