= Brunon Kwiecień =

Brunon Leszek Kwiecień (21 June 1967 – 6 August 2019) was a Polish chemist and university lecturer who became the first person in the Third Polish Republic to be convicted of terrorism. A doctor of chemistry and former employee of the Agricultural University of Kraków, Kwiecień, Kwiecień was arrested in 2012 for planning a terrorist attack on Sejm, the Polish parliament, using a car bomb.

== Career ==
In 1982, at the age of 15, he caused an explosion of an amateur pyrotechnic mixture in his own home, which damaged his hands, depriving them of several fingers, and led to damage to his eyesight.

He graduated from the Chemical Technical School in Kraków and then from chemical technology at the Tadeusz Kościuszko Kraków University of Technology. On 16 May 1996, he began his doctoral studies, and on 27 November 2000, he obtained his doctorate at the Institute of Organic Chemistry of the Polish Academy of Sciences, based on his doctoral thesis entitled "Selected issues of spectroscopy and applications in the synthesis of β-sulfonylenamine". The thesis supervisor was professor Lech Jan Kozerski. He obtained a PhD in chemical sciences in chemistry, specializing in organic chemistry. In November 2012, he joined the National Rebirth of Poland, an far-right political party.

== Accusation and trial for preparing an attack ==
He was accused of preparing an attack between July and November 2012, which was to be carried out at the Sejm of the Republic of Poland, where a budget session took place when high-ranking state authorities, including then-President Bronisław Komorowski and Prime Minister Donald Tusk, were in attendance. The attack was to be carried out using a modified SKOT armoured personnel carrier (its sides were to be weakened by appropriate cuts, which would cause the energy of the explosion to spread more along its sides rather than upwards), in which four tonnes of potassium nitrate-based explosives were to be placed. He had recruited four other people for his cause, however they were actually Internal Security Agency (ABW) agents and one secret service collaborator. During the investigation, the 35 weapons he was accused of possessing, the armored personnel carrier, and the explosives allegedly used in the attack were not found. However, approximately half a kilogram of explosives, including hexagon, was found.

Kwiecień tried to arm himself in 1997, however the authorities refused his application for a firearm permit. He later started arming himself illegally, mostly with weapons bought in Belgium.

Kwiecień was an admirer of Anders Behring Breivik, the perpetrator of the 2011 Norway attacks, and was further inspired by the 1995 Oklahoma City bombing. Internal Security Agency first found out about Kwiecień after it launched investigation into Breivik's Polish contacts when it became known that Breivik had ordered some of the chemicals for his bomb from Poland via the internet. According to ABW, Kwiecień was preparing an attack against the Sejm. According to Kwiecień's account, it was prepared specifically at the request of ABW agents to blow up the Jewish martyrdom monument in Białystok. Furthermore, some witnesses who were Kwiecień's acquaintances spoke of his belief in an impending revolution in Poland and that the government should be overthrown by force. Apart from targeting the parliament, Kwiecień was also preparing murders of Monika Olejnik, an influential journalist, and Hanna Gronkiewicz-Waltz, the mayor of Warsaw.

Kwiecień himself vehemently denied engaging in any activities aimed at committing such a crime. He further claimed that he had been incited to do so by third parties, disguised agents of the secret services, without himself having initiated them. After their suggestions regarding the recruitment of other members of the terrorist organization, he allegedly agreed to invite two of the most active students from his explosives lectures to participate in the project, but they steadfastly refused. He was then contacted by members of the far-right organization Blood & Honour, who were allegedly interested in organizing an attack. Kwiecień's role was supposedly limited to conducting theoretical lectures on explosives. He emphasized that he refused to conduct practical lectures, as he did not have a permit or license for such attempts, but agreed to prepare the group for the attack. The preparations were to include familiarizing them with the use of explosives, the production of explosive mixtures, and the arming and detonation of explosives. At some point he tried to withdraw from it, suspecting that he was involved in an operational game.

In 2012, the body of his murdered mother-in-law was found in a forest, approximately 30 km from his home. Her blood was found, among other things, in Kwiecień's car and at her home. He claimed during the investigation that he was only questioned as a witness, and the blood found was the result of his mother-in-law's frequent nosebleeds or an accidental injury while cleaning his car.

=== Trial and death ===
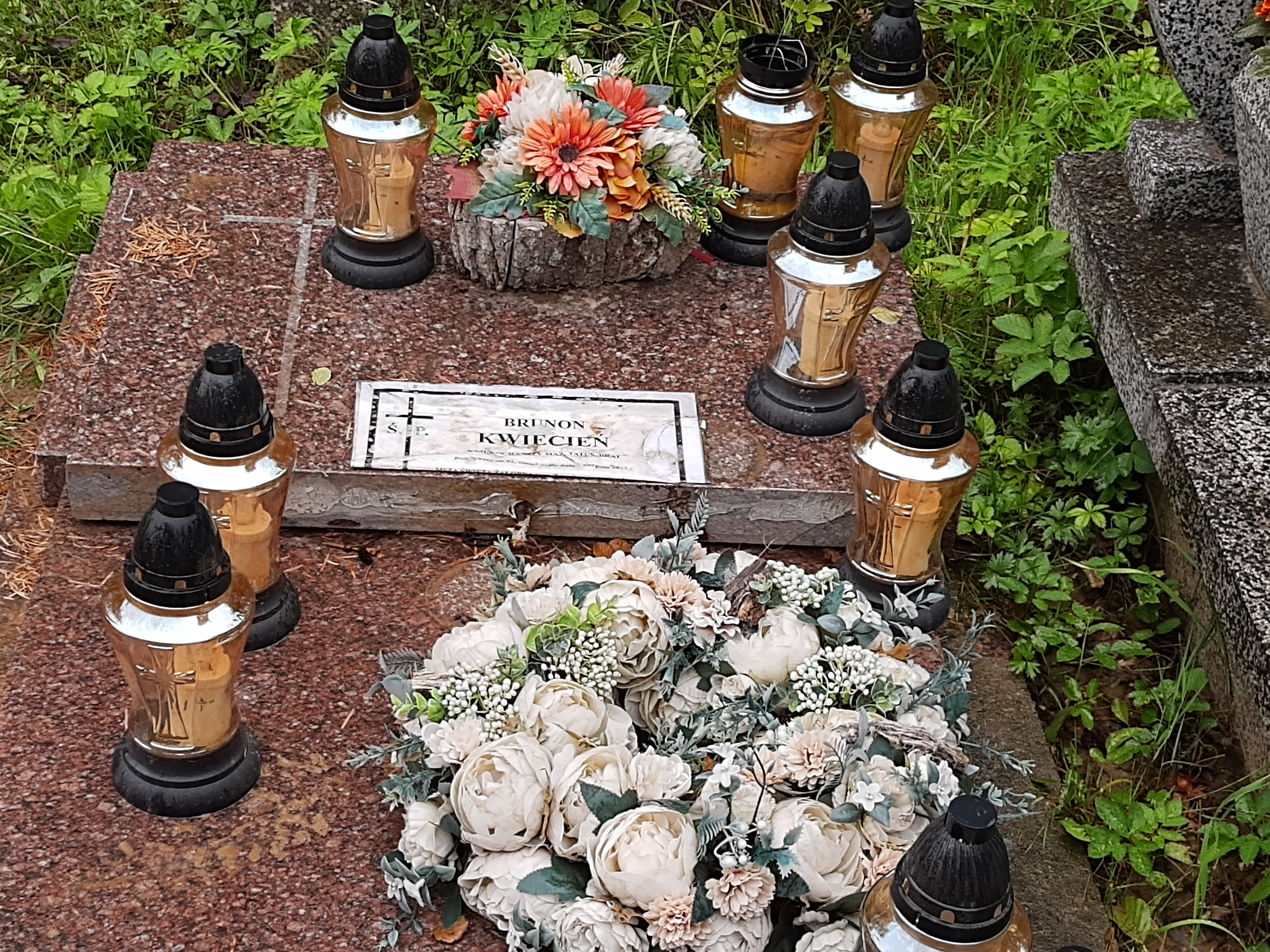
The grave of Brunon Kwiecień at the Prądnik Czerwony Cemetery

He was arrested on 9 November 2012 and the trial began on 28 January 2014. On 21 December 2015, the District Court in Kraków sentenced Kwiecień to 13 years' imprisonment. In early April 2017, he was questioned by the prosecutor's office as a witness in the case of the murder of Katarzyna Zowada in 1998. The questioning concerned his acquaintance with one of the suspects, a researcher at the Jagiellonian University Medical College. As a result of an appeal, on 19 April 2017, the court issued a judgment in which it reduced the absolute prison sentence to 9 years. On 19 April 2018, the Supreme Court of Poland dismissed the cassation appeal. The long duration of the trial, during which Kwiecień was held in pre-trial detention, as well as the manner of conducting the investigation, were the subject of controversy in the media.

He was imprisoned in Wrocław Prison No. 1, where he died on 6 August 2019. An autopsy determined the cause to be a subarachnoid intracranial hemorrhage resulting from natural disease causes. He was buried at the Prądnik Czerwony Cemetery.

== Personal life ==
Kwiecień was married and had two sons.

== See also ==
- Far-right politics in Poland
- Copycat crime
- Christchurch mosque shootings, a mass shooting in New Zealand partly inspired by the Norway attacks
