= Katarzyna (disambiguation) =

Katarzyna is a Polish given name (the article also includes a list of persons with the name).

Katarzyna may also refer to:

- Katarzyna, Greater Poland Voivodeship (west-central Poland)
- Katarzyna, Kuyavian-Pomeranian Voivodeship (north-central Poland)
- Święta Katarzyna, Lower Silesian Voivodeship (south-west Poland)
- Święta Katarzyna, Świętokrzyskie Voivodeship (south-central Poland)
