= Higino =

Higino is a given name and surname. Notable people with the name include:

== Given name ==
- Higino A. Acala Sr. (1925–1968), Filipino lawyer and civil servant
- Higino Carneiro (born 1962), Angolan politician

== Surname ==
- Carlos Higino (born 1972), Brazilian economist and politician
- Diego Higino (born 1986), Brazilian footballer

== See also ==
- Higinio
