= Wincentowo =

Wincentowo may refer to the following places:

- Wincentowo, Kuyavian-Pomeranian Voivodeship (north-central Poland)
- Wincentowo, Płock County in Masovian Voivodeship (east-central Poland)
- Wincentowo, Wyszków County in Masovian Voivodeship (east-central Poland)
- Wincentowo, Słupca County in Greater Poland Voivodeship (west-central Poland)
- Wincentowo, Szamotuły County in Greater Poland Voivodeship (west-central Poland)
- Wincentowo, Wolsztyn County in Greater Poland Voivodeship (west-central Poland)
- Wincentowo, Lubusz Voivodeship (west Poland)
