= Życie =

Polish weekly journal

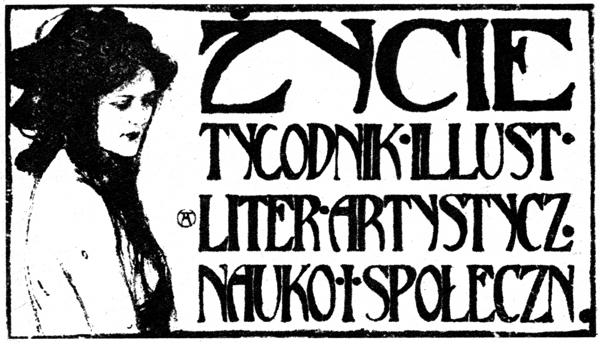
- The Życie banner as designed by Teodor Axentowicz
- Editor: Stanisław Przybyszewski
- Frequency: Fortnightly
- Format: Broadsheet
- Publisher: Ignacy Sewer-Maciejowski
- Founder: Ludwik Szczepański
- Founded: 1897
- First issue: 1897
- Final issue: 1900
- Country: Austria-Hungary
- Based in: Kraków and Lwów
- Language: Polish

Życie ([ˈʐɨ.t͡ɕɛ], "Life") was an illustrated weekly established in 1897 and published in Kraków and Lwów in the Austrian partition of Poland. Founded by Ludwik Szczepański, with time it became one of the most popular Polish literary and artistic journals. Although short-lasting (it went bankrupt in 1900), it shaped an entire generation of Polish artists and art critics, notably those associated with the so-called Young Poland.

== Content ==
Initially the weekly was focused on current news, politics, social and national matters in what was then the Austro-Hungarian Galicia. Among its collaborators and correspondents in the early period were Socialist journalists Kazimierz Kelles-Krauz, Iza Moszczeńska and Wilhelm Feldman.

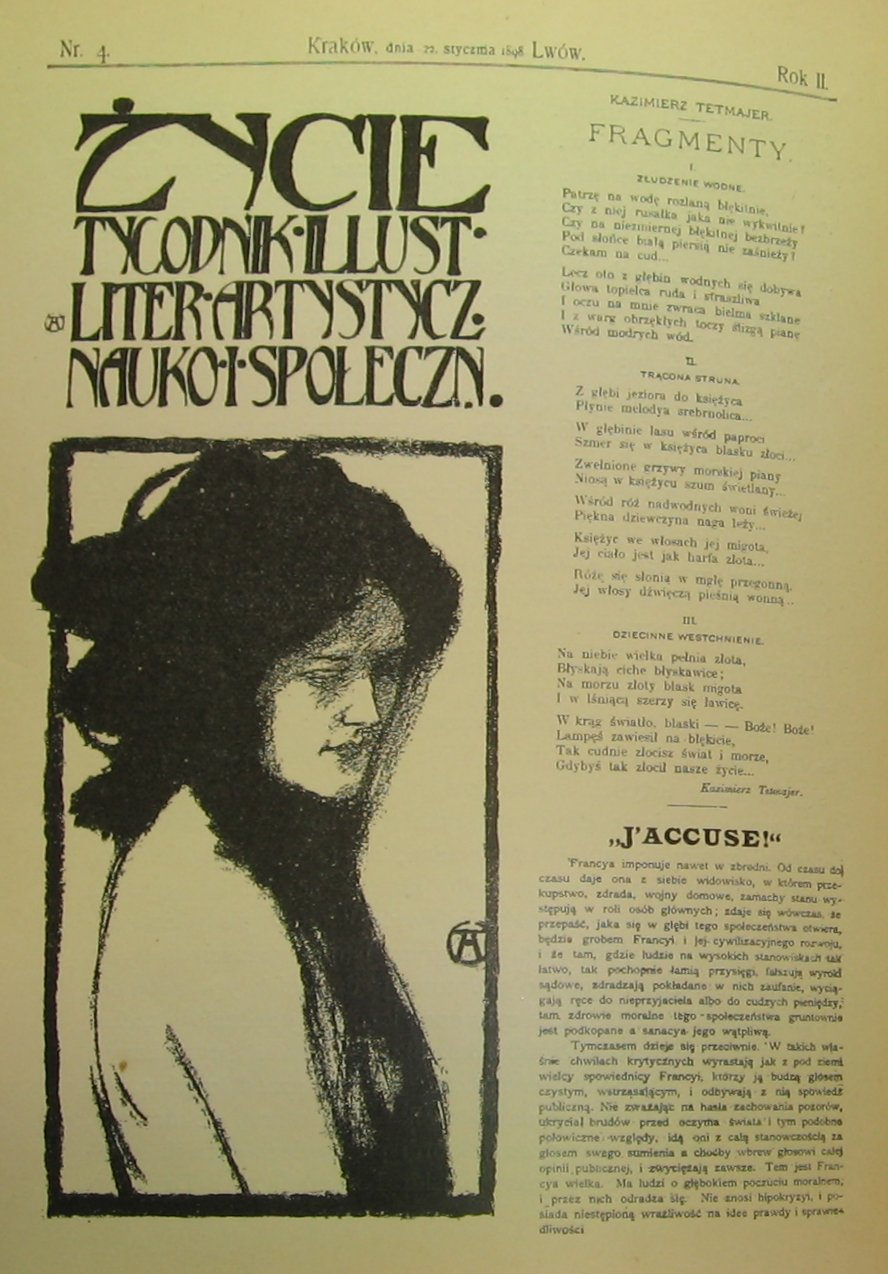
Edition of the Życie reporting on Zola's J'Accuse letter and the Dreyfus affair

The magazine was initially a commercial failure and failed to gain enough readership. Under such circumstances the title was bought by Ignacy Sewer-Maciejowski, who offered the job of editor in chief to Stanisław Przybyszewski, who refocused the magazine to art and literary matters. Since then Życie gained much popularity thanks to publishing literary works by some of the most renowned Polish writers of the epoch, including Stanisław Przybyszewski, Kazimierz Przerwa-Tetmajer, Gabriela Zapolska, Jan Kasprowicz, Maria Konopnicka, Adolf Dygasiński and Adam Asnyk. Stanisław Wyspiański became the new art director of the magazine. Thanks to his efforts each edition was richly illustrated with reproductions of symbolist, impressionist and Art Nouveau paintings and prints

The reformed Życie was soon turned into a bi-weekly published in large, broadsheet format, but on coated paper and in full colour. In addition to numerous reproductions and gravures published in every issue, the magazine also ordered a distinctive, elaborate font. Apart from the aforementioned authors, Wyspiański and Przybyszewski themselves, the Życie frequently also published texts by Kazimiera Zawistowska, Wincenty Brzozowski, Jerzy Żuławski and Tadeusz Rittner. It also published many works of foreign literature, including French, Czech and Scandinavian.

Among the most outstanding examples of Życie's influence on contemporary Polish culture was the January 10th, 1899 issue that contained Confiteor by Stanisław Przybyszewski (a monumental essay on the role of artist) and a set of essays by Artur Górski under a common title Young Poland that gave the name to the entire modernist period in Polish literature, graphic art and music.

Despite relatively high influence and readership, the Życie struggled constantly with Austro-Hungarian State Censorship Office, which on numerous occasions ordered all the copies of several consecutive issues of the journal to be confiscated and destroyed. This resulted in financial difficulties and eventual bankruptcy in 1900.
