= Przewóz, Kuyavian-Pomeranian Voivodeship =

Przewóz
- Village
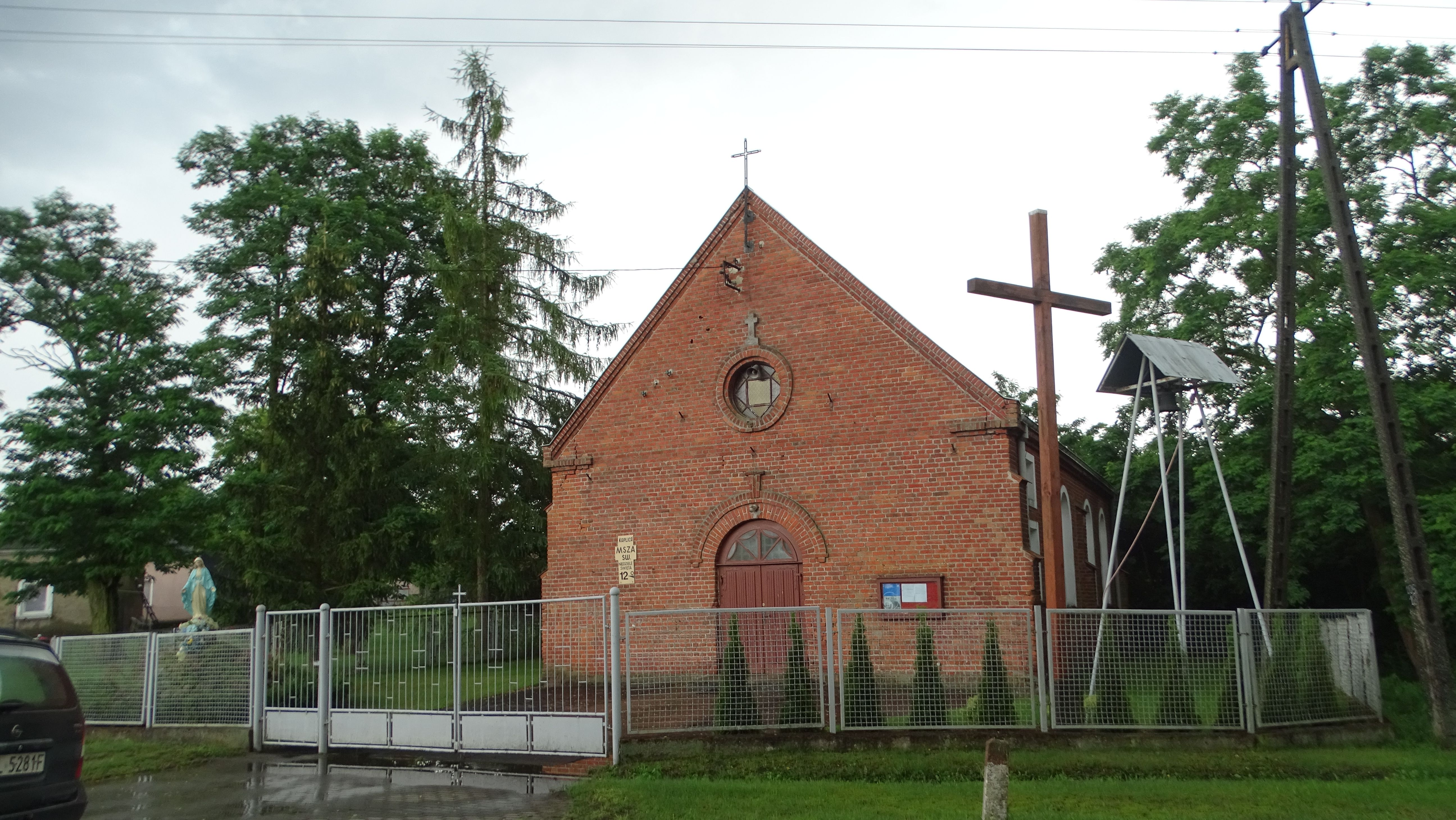
- Chapel of Our Lady of Częstochowa in Przewóz

- Location within Poland
- Coordinates: 52°29′N 18°24′E
- Country: Poland
- Voivodeship: Kuyavian-Pomeranian
- County: Radziejów
- Gmina: Piotrków Kujawski
- Time zone: UTC+1 (CET)
  - Summer (DST): UTC+2 (CEST)

Przewóz [ˈpʂɛvus] is a village in the administrative district of Gmina Piotrków Kujawski, within Radziejów County, Kuyavian-Pomeranian Voivodeship, in central Poland.
