= Palczewo, Kuyavian-Pomeranian Voivodeship =

Palczewo
- Village
- Location within Poland
- Coordinates: 52°33′N 18°31′E
- Country: Poland
- Voivodeship: Kuyavian-Pomeranian
- County: Radziejów
- Gmina: Piotrków Kujawski

Palczewo [palˈt͡ʂɛvɔ] is a village in the administrative district of Gmina Piotrków Kujawski, within Radziejów County, Kuyavian-Pomeranian Voivodeship, in north-central Poland.
