= Trojaczek =

- Village
- Location within Poland
- Coordinates: 52°31′N 18°35′E
- Country: Poland
- Voivodeship: Kuyavian-Pomeranian
- County: Radziejów
- Gmina: Piotrków Kujawski
- Time zone: UTC+1 (CET)
  - Summer (DST): UTC+2 (CEST)
- Vehicle registration: CRA

Trojaczek [trɔˈjat͡ʂɛk] is a village in the administrative district of Gmina Piotrków Kujawski, within Radziejów County, Kuyavian-Pomeranian Voivodeship, in central Poland.

As of 1827, Trojaczek had a population of 44.
