= Dębołęka, Kuyavian-Pomeranian Voivodeship =

Dębołęka
- Village
- Location within Poland
- Coordinates: 52°30′N 18°28′E
- Country: Poland
- Voivodeship: Kuyavian-Pomeranian
- County: Radziejów
- Gmina: Piotrków Kujawski

Dębołęka [dɛmbɔˈwɛnka] is a village in the administrative district of Gmina Piotrków Kujawski, within Radziejów County, Kuyavian-Pomeranian Voivodeship, in north-central Poland.
