= Byszewo, Radziejów County =

Byszewo
- Location within Poland
- Coordinates: 52°31′35″N 18°23′48″E
- Country: Poland
- Voivodeship: Kuyavian-Pomeranian
- County: Radziejów
- Gmina: Piotrków Kujawski
- Time zone: UTC+1 (CET)
  - Summer (DST): UTC+2 (CEST)
- Postal code: 88–230
- Car plates: CRA

Byszewo is a village in Kuyavian-Pomeranian Voivodeship, Poland in the Gmina Piotrków Kujawski, Radziejów County.

== History ==
Between 1975 and 1998, the village was located in the Włocławek Voivodeship.
