= Katarzyna =

- Pronunciation: [kataˈʐɨna]
- Gender: female

Origin
- Region of origin: Poland

Other names
- Related names: Catherine

Katarzyna [kataˈʐɨna] is a Polish given name, equivalent to English "Catherine". Its diminutive forms include Kasia, Katarzynka, Kasieńka, Kasiunia, Kasiulka; augmentative – Kaśka, Kacha, Kachna.

Individuals named Katarzyna may choose their name day from the following dates: February 2, February 13, March 9, March 22, March 24, April 1, April 6, April 17, April 29, April 30, May 21, September 4, September 15, November 25, or December 31.

== Notable people ==
=== Nobility ===
- Joanna Katarzyna Radziwiłł, Polish noble lady
- Katarzyna Barbara Radziwiłł, Polish-Lithuanian szlachcianka
- Katarzyna Branicka, Polish noblewoman
- Katarzyna Juszczak, Polish-born Italian judoka and freestyle wrestler
- Katarzyna Karolina Radziwiłł, Polish noble lady
- Katarzyna Kostka, Polish noble lady
- Katarzyna Lubomirska, Polish szlachcianka
- Katarzyna Ostrogska (1560–1579), Polish noble lady
- Katarzyna Ostrogska (1602–1642), Polish szlachcianka
- Katarzyna Potocka, Polish noble lady
- Katarzyna Sobieska, the sister of King of Poland Jan III Sobieski and a noble lady
- Katarzyna Tomicka, Polish noble lady

=== Artists ===
- Katarzyna Kobro, Polish sculptor
- Katarzyna Kozyra, one of main Polish video artists

=== In other fields ===
- Katarzyna Bachleda-Curuś, Polish speed skater and Olympic medallist
- Katarzyna Cichopek, Polish actress
- Katarzyna Dolinska, one of the contestants on America's Next Top Model, Cycle 10
- Katarzyna Figura, Polish actress
- Katarzyna Gałązka, Polish actress
- Katarzyna Jurkowska-Kowalska, Polish artistic gymnast
- Katarzyna Kawa, Polish tennis player
- Katarzyna de Lazari-Radek , Polish philosopher
- Katarzyna Lubnauer, Polish politician
- Katarzyna Łaniewska, Polish actress
- Katarzyna Niewiadoma, Polish racing cyclist
- Katarzyna Majchrzak, Polish high jumper
- Katarzyna Piter, Polish tennis player
- Katarzyna Rogowiec, Polish Paralympian
- Katarzyna Skowrońska, Polish volleyball player
- Katarzyna Pakosińska, member of Polish cabaret group Kabaret Moralnego Niepokoju
- Katarzyna Strusińska known as Kasia Strus, Polish fashion model
- Katarzyna Zillmann, Polish rower
- Katarzyna Zowada, Polish murder victim
