= Gmina Piotrków Kujawski =

Gmina Piotrków Kujawski Piotrków Kujawski Commune
- Gmina
- Coat of arms
- Interactive map of Gmina Piotrków Kujawski
- Coordinates (Piotrków Kujawski): 52°32′49″N 18°30′3″E
- Country: Poland
- Voivodeship: Kuyavian-Pomeranian
- County: Radziejów
- Seat: Piotrków Kujawski

Area
  - Total: 138.62 km^{2} (53.52 sq mi)

Population (2006)
  - Total: 9,646
  - Density: 69.59/km^{2} (180.2/sq mi)
  - Urban: 4,509
  - Rural: 5,137
- Time zone: UTC+1 (CET)
  - Summer (DST): UTC+2 (CEST)
- Vehicle registration: CRA
- Website: http://www.piotrkowkujawski.pl/

Gmina Piotrków Kujawski is an urban-rural gmina (administrative district) in Radziejów County, Kuyavian-Pomeranian Voivodeship, in central Poland. Its seat is the town of Piotrków Kujawski, which lies approximately 10 kilometres (6 mi) south of Radziejów and 55 km (34 mi) south of Toruń.

The gmina covers an area of 138.62 square kilometres (53.5 sq mi), and as of 2006 its total population is 9,646 (out of which the population of Piotrków Kujawski amounts to 4,509, and the population of the rural part of the gmina is 5,137).

The gmina contains part of the protected area called Gopło Landscape Park.

== Villages ==
Apart from the town of Piotrków Kujawski, Gmina Piotrków Kujawski contains the villages and settlements of Anusin, Bycz, Byszewo, Czarnotka, Dębołęka, Gradowo, Higieniewo, Jerzyce, Kaczewo, Kaspral, Katarzyna, Kozy, Łabędzin, Lubsin, Malina, Nowa Wieś, Palczewo, Połajewek, Połajewo, Przedłuż, Przewóz, Rogalin, Rudzk Duży, Rudzk Mały, Rzeczyca, Stawiska, Świątniki, Szewce, Teodorowo, Trojaczek, Wincentowo, Wójcin, Zakręta and Zborowiec.

== Neighbouring gminas ==
Gmina Piotrków Kujawski is bordered by the gminas of Bytoń, Kruszwica, Radziejów, Skulsk, Topólka and Wierzbinek.
