= Przedłuż =

- Village
- Location within Poland
- Coordinates: 52°32′36″N 18°24′35″E
- Country: Poland
- Voivodeship: Kuyavian-Pomeranian
- County: Radziejów
- Gmina: Piotrków Kujawski

Przedłuż [ˈpʂɛdwuʂ] is a village in the administrative district of Gmina Piotrków Kujawski, within Radziejów County, Kuyavian-Pomeranian Voivodeship, in north-central Poland.
