= Polish Song Festival in Vitebsk =

The All-Union Polish Song Festival in Vitebsk (Polish: Festiwal Piosenki Polskiej w Witebsku; Russian: Всесоюзный фестиваль польской песни в Витебске) was a music festival held between 1988 and 1990 in Vitebsk, in the Byelorussian Soviet Socialist Republic (now the Republic of Belarus. The event brought together young performers of Polish music from all Soviet republics as well as guests from Poland. It was conceived as a counterpart to the Soviet Song Festival, held annually in Zielona Góra, Zielona Góra Voivodeship, Poland. The location of the Polish Song Festival was related to a partnership agreement between Vitebsk and Zielona Góra. For the purposes of the Polish Song Festival, an amphitheater with a capacity of approximately 5,000 was built in the city in 1988. viewers, where the Slavic Bazaar Festival has been held since 1992. The Polish Song Festival had only two editions: in 1988 and 1990. After the first festival, held on July 17–22, 1988, the Soviet record label; Melodiya released an album with a selection of songs from the competition. The then leaders of Poland and the USSR, Wojciech Jaruzelski and Mikhail Gorbachev, sent their congratulations to the participants. One of its more famous participants from the Polish side was Maryla Rodowicz, Halina Frąckowiak, Michał Bajor and Ireneusz Dudek.
