= Agricultural University of Kraków =

Agricultural school in Kraków, Poland

Coordinates: 50°3′52″N 19°55′33″E

- Uniwersytet Rolniczy im. Hugona Kołłątaja w Krakowie
- Latin: Universitas Rerum Rusticarum Cracoviensis
- Type: Public
- Established: 1890
- Rector: Professor Sylwester Tabor, PhD. Eng.
- Students: 6,707 (12.2023)
- Location: Al. Mickiewicza 21, 31-103 Kraków, Kraków, Poland
- Campus: Urban
- Website: https://urk.edu.pl/en/

The Agricultural University of Kraków (Polish: Uniwersytet Rolniczy im. Hugona Kołłątaja w Krakowie), located in Kraków, Poland, became a university by decree of the Council of Ministers as of 28 September 1972. Formerly, it was known as the Higher College of Agriculture, as well as other names, since its establishment in 1890. The university is named after the prominent Polish constitutional reformer and educationalist Hugo Kołłątaj.

== History ==
As early as 1776 the university's patron Hugo Kołłątaj, then a member of the National Education Commission, postulated creating a Department of Agriculture as part of the reformed Kraków Academy. The department existed for a very short period between 1806 and 1809 due to the partitions of Poland that ended the existence of the sovereign Polish state. Over 80 years later, a three-year Agricultural Study was established at the Faculty of Philosophy of the Jagiellonian University in 1890, at the Collegium Iuridicum.

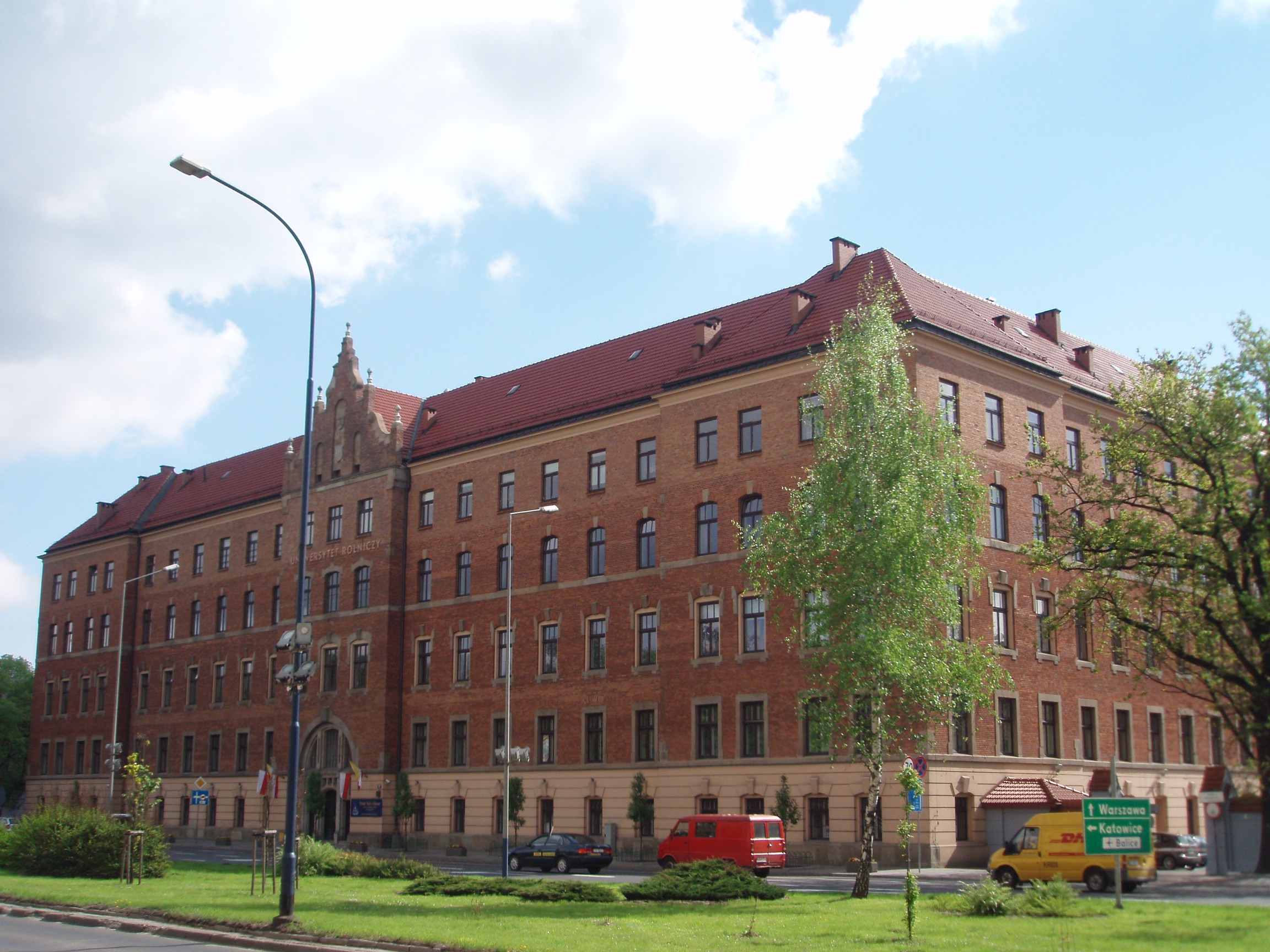
Collegium Godlewskiego

Professor Emil Godlewski became the Head of the Study in 1892. It was thanks to his efforts that the Collegium Agronomicum was built in 1906–1910 for Agricultural Study. The building, later named after him, is now the seat of the Rector's office, and the university's Senate. The Study existed till 1923 when it was transformed into the Faculty of Agriculture of the Jagiellonian University. In 1924 the faculty offered Europe's first Higher Academic Cooperative Course. The studies took four years and graduates obtained a BSc degree. In the same year horticultural courses were offered, later transformed into a three-year Horticultural Study.

The Second World War caused considerable losses to the university, most seriously among the Faculty of Agriculture staff (see: Operation Sonderaktion Krakau). In spite of considerable difficulties posed by the German occupation secret courses in agronomy were conducted, headed by a temporary Dean Anatol Listowski. After the war, the faculty resumed its activity in January 1945. In 1946 it was renamed as the Agriculture and Forestry Faculty, and later (1949) transformed into two separate faculties.

In 1953 the Faculty of Agriculture and Forestry became the Higher College of Agriculture. In 1963 the Faculty of Animal Science branched out from the faculty. Further development of the university took place in the following years. New faculties were created: the Faculty of Land Reclamation (1955) with the Geodesy Division (since 1960); Forestry (reactivated in 1963), and the Faculty of Horticulture.

By decree of the Council of Ministers as of 28 September 1972 the Higher College of Agriculture became a University of Agriculture. A new division of Mechanization and Energetics in Agriculture was formed and later changed into a separate faculty in 1977.

An out-of-town branch called the Faculty of Economics and Agricultural Commerce was created in Rzeszów in 1973, then changed into the Faculty of Economy - Rzeszów Branch. Currently, since 1 April 1997 it has regained its status as the Faculty of Economy. A Division of Food Technology was created at the Faculty of Agriculture in 1974 and became a separate Faculty of Food Technology twenty years later.

Between the years 1923 and 1990 over 26 thousand students graduated from the Agricultural Study, later Faculty of Agriculture of the Jagiellonian University and the Agricultural University of Kraków, out of which 260 became associate or full professors, almost half of them employed at higher educational institutions or research institutes. 8105 students pursued studies at the Agricultural University in the academic year 1995–96, including 5582 internal and 2523 external students.

== Organizational structure ==
Faculties (since 1997)

- Agriculture and Economics
- Animal Sciences
- Environmental Engineering and Geodesy
- Food Technology
- Forestry
- Horticulture
- Production Engineering and Energetics
- Biotechnology
- Landscaping
- University Center of Veterinary Medicine (joint faculty with Jagiellonian University)
- Branch Faculty of Economy in Rzeszów

== Enrollment ==
Over 8,000 students pursue vocational, undergraduate and graduate programmes (both internal and external) at the Agricultural University. They may choose from among nine majors. The university offers various post-graduate programmes and four-year doctoral studies. The university employs over 800 research workers, 175 professors and associate professors. All faculties, except the one in Rzeszów offer degrees of Doctor of Science and Doctor habilitated.

== See also ==
- Brunon Kwiecień
- Science in Poland
- Commission of National Education
- Agricultural University's ranking among Polish universities
