= Teodorowo, Radziejów County =

Teodorowo
- Village
- Location within Poland
- Coordinates: 52°28′33″N 18°34′07″E
- Country: Poland
- Voivodeship: Kuyavian-Pomeranian
- County: Radziejów
- Gmina: Piotrków Kujawski

Teodorowo [tɛɔdɔˈrɔvɔ] is a village in the administrative district of Gmina Piotrków Kujawski, within Radziejów County, Kuyavian-Pomeranian Voivodeship, in north-central Poland.
