= Malina, Kuyavian-Pomeranian Voivodeship =

Malina
- Village
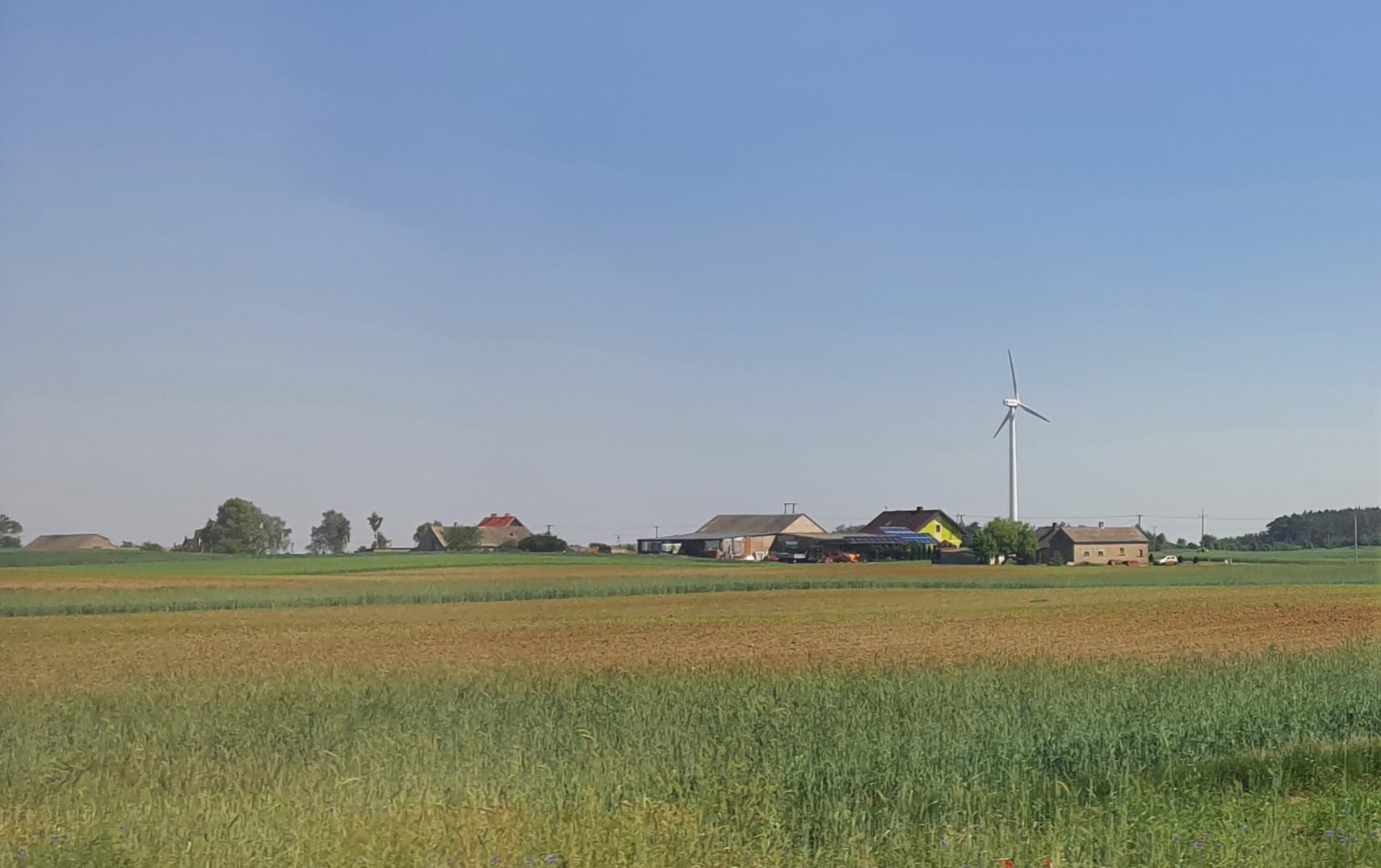

- Location within Poland
- Coordinates: 52°29′55″N 18°32′59″E
- Country: Poland
- Voivodeship: Kuyavian-Pomeranian
- County: Radziejów
- Gmina: Piotrków Kujawski
- Population: 60

Malina [maˈlina] is a village in the administrative district of Gmina Piotrków Kujawski, within Radziejów County, Kuyavian-Pomeranian Voivodeship, in north-central Poland.
