= Tadeusz Rittner =

Polish dramatist, prose writer and literary critic

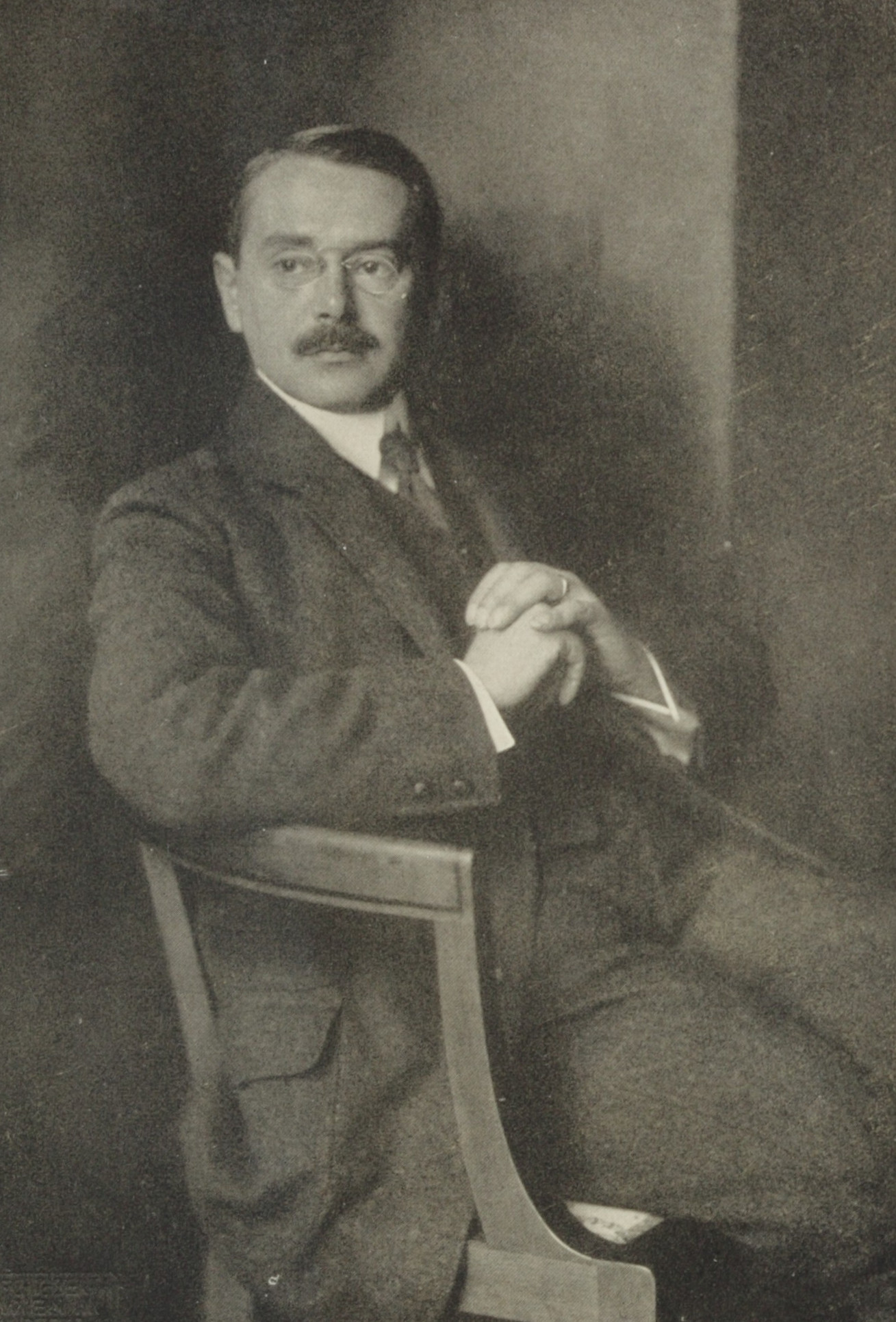
Image of Tadeusz Rittner, c. 1913

Tadeusz Rittner (pseudonym: Tomasz Czaszka; May 31, 1873 – June 19, 1921) was a Polish dramatist, prose writer, and literary critic.

Rittner was born in Lemberg, Austro-Hungarian Empire.

He also wrote a number of books.

== Sources ==
- Austria Encyclopedia
