= Wincentowo, Kuyavian-Pomeranian Voivodeship =

Wincentowo
- Village
- Location within Poland
- Coordinates: 52°30′N 18°37′E
- Country: Poland
- Voivodeship: Kuyavian-Pomeranian
- County: Radziejów
- Gmina: Piotrków Kujawski
- Population: 80

Wincentowo [vint͡sɛnˈtɔvɔ] is a village in the administrative district of Gmina Piotrków Kujawski, within Radziejów County, Kuyavian-Pomeranian Voivodeship, in north-central Poland.
