= Higinio Ruvalcaba =

Mexican violinist and composer

Higinio Ruvalcaba (11 January 1905 in Yahualica, Jalisco – 15 January 1976 in Mexico City) was a Mexican violinist and composer.

He received his first lessons when he was 4, from his father, who was an upholsterer who played cello in the local band. In 1917, at age twelve, Higinio Ruvalcaba gives his first concert as a soloist, at the Teatro Degollado in Guadalajara.

He replaced Jenö Léner, founder and namesake of Léner String Quartet, touring with second violin José Smilovitz; viola Herbert Froelich, and Hungarian cellist Imre Hartman after Léner left the group in 1943 due to internal disagreements.
