= Kasia 100/170 mine =

Polish anti vehicle mines

The Kasia 100, Kasia 170, and Kasia 2 x 100 are Polish off-route anti-vehicle mines. The mines consist of a warhead, and are mounted on a four-legged metal frame. The warheads are either 100 or 170 millimeters in diameter. A number of interchangeable warheads provide different effects:

- Misznay Schardin effect single fragment
- Misznay Schardin effect with multiple fragments
- Ball bearing fragmentation
- Combination

The Kasia 100 warhead can penetrate up to 70 millimeters of armour; the Kasia 170, 119 millimeters. The Kasia 2 x 100 variant uses two Kasia 100 warheads on a single frame.
