= Soviet Song Festival =

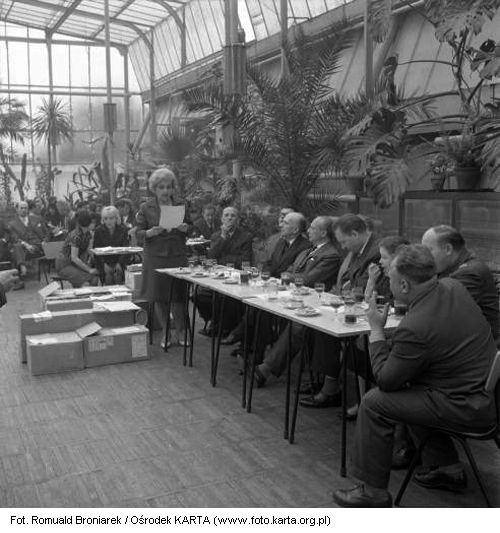
Qualifying rounds for the 1st Soviet Song, June 1965.

The Soviet Song Festival (Polish: Festiwal Piosenki Radzieckiej) was a music festival organized between 1965 and 1989, held annually in Zielona Góra, Zielona Góra Voivodeship, Poland. The equivalent of the festival in the USSR was the Polish Song Festival in Vitebsk, which took place in 1988 and 1990.

== History ==
The first editions of the festival were organized by the Polish–Soviet Friendship Society. Over time, the Ministry of Culture and Art joined the organization. The main prizes were Gold, Silver, and Bronze Samovars. The first festival took place in 1965. The festival enjoyed its greatest popularity in the 1970s. The last edition took place in June 1989.

The festival hosts included: Krystyna Loska, Jan Suzin, Tadeusz Sznuk, Edyta Wojtczak, and Maria Wróblewska. The jury included: Aleksander Bardini, Tadeusz Wojciech Maklakiewicz, Czesław Niemen, Władysław Szpilman, and Wojciech Trzciński. The performers were accompanied by conductors and their orchestras (including Stefan Rachoń with the Polish Radio Symphony Orchestra, Zygmunt Hassa, and Henryk Debich). The festival's musical director was Jerzy Milian.

The festival's laureates included: Małgorzata Ostrowska (1975), Urszula Kasprzak (1977). The festival also featured, among others: Michał Bajor, Mieczysław Fogg, Anna German, Irena Jarocka, Grażyna Łobaszewska, Alicja Majewska, Maryla Rodowicz (1979), Janusz Panasewicz (in 1981), Łucja Prus, Irena Santor, Urszula Sipińska, Zdzisława Sośnicka, Izabela Trojanowska, Budka Suflera, Czerwone Gitary, Trubadurzy. The festival also featured artists from the Soviet Union (including Alla Pugacheva and Żanna Biczewska).

During the festival, other cultural events dedicated to Polish-Soviet friendship were also held: the festival of children's song and dance groups "Colours of Friendship", Days of Soviet Literature, Polish-Soviet open-air painting workshops, and music and book fairs.
