= Kasia Miednik =

Polish singer

Kasia Miednik (Katarzyna Izabela Miednik; born 4 July 1995) is best known as a young girl singer from Poland.

Kasia was born in Dzierzoniow, Poland.

Kasia started acting and singing at the age of three. Since then she won many prizes at song contests and festivals held in Poland and abroad (Czech Republic, Greece, Italy, Ireland, Estonia, Belarus). Her father, Aleksander Miednik, abandoned his job to become her manager in her numerous tours. In 2006, she starred as the main character, Sara, in the musical A Little Princess adapted from the novel by Frances Burnett in the Capitol Musical Theatre, Wrocław.

== Awards ==
- 2004
  - First place in the category under 10 years at 6th All-Poland Young Singers Festival "Golden Alarm-Clock"
- 2005:
  - Third place in the category 7–10 years
- 2006:
  - Grand Prix of the 5th Competition of Youth Song in Kalisz, Poland (Kaliski Konkurs Piosenki Młodzieżowej)
  - Grand Prix of the International Children Music Contest at Slavianski Bazaar in Vitebsk
  - Grand Prix and the special award of Polish TV in the all-Poland festival "Rainbow Songs" ("Tęczowe Piosenki")
  - 1st place in the 15th Festival of the Foreign Language Song, Wrocław
- 2007
  - Special jury prize at the 16th Festival of the Foreign Language Song, Wrocław

== Discography ==
- Song W wesołym miasteczku ("In a Happy Small Town") in the album "12th Song Contest 'Win the Success" (12 Konkurs Piosenki 'Wygraj Sukces') (2007)

== Singles ==
- Bliżej Ciebie (2013)
- Błogostan feat. Hanula (2020)
- Mała (2021)
- The Way (2021)
- Liar (2021)
- Koty Chodzą Nocami (2021)
