= Kozy, Gmina Lipnica =

Kozy
- Village
- Location within Poland
- Coordinates: 54°4′0″N 17°24′40″E
- Country: Poland
- Voivodeship: Pomeranian
- County: Bytów
- Gmina: Lipnica

Kozy [ˈkɔzɨ] is a village in the administrative district of Gmina Lipnica, within Bytów County, Pomeranian Voivodeship, in northern Poland.

For details of the history of the region, see History of Pomerania.
