= Rzeczyca, Kuyavian-Pomeranian Voivodeship =

Rzeczyca
- Village
- Location within Poland
- Coordinates: 52°34′03″N 18°27′15″E
- Country: Poland
- Voivodeship: Kuyavian-Pomeranian
- County: Radziejów
- Gmina: Piotrków Kujawski
- Time zone: UTC+1 (CET)
  - Summer (DST): UTC+2 (CEST)
- Vehicle registration: CRA

Rzeczyca [ʐɛˈt͡ʂɨt͡sa] is a village in the administrative district of Gmina Piotrków Kujawski, within Radziejów County, Kuyavian-Pomeranian Voivodeship, in central Poland.

Four Polish citizens were murdered by Nazi Germany in the village during World War II.
