= Murder of Katarzyna Zowada =

Polish criminal case

- Date: Between 12 November 1998 and 6 January 1999
- Type: Murder, dismemberment and skinning
- Motive: Sexual
- Accused: Robert Janczewski
- Charges: Murder with particular cruelty
- Verdict: Acquittal

Katarzyna Zowada (1 June 1975 – 1998) was a student at Jagiellonian University in Kraków, Poland who was tortured and killed in late 1998 or early 1999. After her death, the killer interfered with Zowada's corpse through dismemberment and skinning. Robert Janczewski was convicted and jailed in 2018 and released on 31 October 2024, by the Kraków appeals court, 2nd criminal division, which acquitted him.

== Katarzyna Zowada ==
Zowada was 23 years old at the time of her death. She was a religious studies student at Jagiellonian University in Kraków who was described as kind, but quiet. Her disappearance became evident on 12 November 1998 when she failed to meet her mother at a psychiatric clinic in Nowa Huta, where she had been treated for depression.

== Discovery of remains ==
On 6 January 1999, while the tugboat Elk was stationed near the Dąbie barrage on the Vistula river, the crew found human skin on the boat's propeller. DNA tests indicated the skin was Zowada's. Forensic testing showed that the skin had been dissected from the body and prepared in such a way as to make a piece of clothing. On 14 January, Zowada's right leg was recovered from the river. The corpse had been dismembered and decapitated.

== Investigation ==
In 2000, the investigation into Zowada's death ended pending further information. In 2012, with progress in forensic science, the investigation was re-activated and Zowada's remains were exhumed for further autopsy. Scientists from the Wrocław Medical University created a model of Zowada's injuries. It was concluded that the perpetrator used a sharp instrument to cut Zowada's neck, armpit, and groin leading to her death through exsanguination.

Forensic experts gave a profile of the murderer as someone who was sadistic, had a knowledge of dissection and preservation of skin, and may have studied a particular (undisclosed) martial art.

== Robert Janczewski ==
Robert Janczewski was born in 1965 and lived in Kraków. He had worked in the human dissection laboratory and the Institute of Zoology at Jagiellonian University where animal skins were prepared. His employment was terminated when he killed all of the rabbits at the institute. Janczewski had training in martial arts and a history of harassing women. He was known to Zowada and visited her grave. In 1999, Janczewski was a person of interest but at that time he was not arrested.

In 2017, police received an incriminating letter from Janczewski's friend. The contents of the letter were not made public. On 4 October 2017, after blood was found during a search of the bathroom of his Kazimierz apartment, Janczewski was arrested. He was charged with aggravated murder with particular cruelty. He was kept on remand while police continued their investigations. In September 2019, prosecutors requested a closed trial.

On 31 October 2024 the Court of Appeal acquitted Robert Janczewski by the principle of in dubio pro reo.

== Fit for a Killer ==
In February 2026, HBO Max released Fit for a Killer, a docuseries that explores Zowada's murder case, referred to as "one of Poland's most notorious cold cases". It retraces the events through taped footage, interviews, and filmed re-enactments. The pilot episode is set in January 1999 and focuses on the discovery of a corset made from human skin in the Vistula River, with additional episodes scheduled for future release.

== See also ==
- Lists of solved missing person cases
- List of unsolved murders (1980–2000)
