= Bream (disambiguation) =

A bream is a common name for numerous species of fish, particularly Abramis brama.

Bream may mean:

== Fish ==
- Black bream (disambiguation), the common name of several species of fish
- Blicca bjoerkna (silver bream or white bream), a European species of freshwater fish in the carp family
- Bluegill, sometimes called 'bream'
- Bony bream (Nematalosa erebi), a widespread and common, small to medium-sized Australian freshwater fish
- Common bream (Abramis brama), a European species of freshwater fish in the carp family
- Emperor bream (Lethrinidae), a family of fishes in the order Perciformes commonly known as emperors, emperor breams, and pigface breams
- Gilt-head bream (Sparus aurata), called the Orata in antiquity and in Italy and Spain today, a fish of the bream family Sparidae found in the Mediterranean Sea and the eastern coastal regions of the North Atlantic Ocean
- Malawi bream (Chilotilapia rhoadesii), a freshwater fish in the cichlid family, which is endemic to Lake Malawi in East Africa
- Red bream (disambiguation), several varieties of fish
- Sea bream, various species of marine fish in the family Sparidae
- Silver bream (disambiguation), the common name of several species of fish
- Threadfin bream (also known as whiptail bream and false snapper), a variety of species in the family Nemipteridae within the order Perciformes, found in tropical waters of the Indian and western Pacific Oceans
- Wuchang bream (Megalobrama amblycephala), a species of cyprinid fish native to the Yangtze basin, China

== People ==
- Bream (surname)

== Places ==
- Bream, Gloucestershire, a village in England
- Bream, West Virginia, an unincorporated community in the US
- Bream Bay, a locality and bay in New Zealand
- Bream Head, a promontory in New Zealand
- Bream Wood, a biological Site of Special Scientific Interest in Sussex, England

== Ships ==
- Bream, an Australian gunboat: see Queensland Maritime Defence Force Auxiliary Gunboats
- HMS Bream, at least two ships of the Royal Navy
- USS Bream (SS-243), an American submarine

== See also ==
- Bream Beach, a suburb of Shoalhaven, Australia
- Bream Creek, a rural locality in South-east Tasmania
- BREEAM (Building Research Establishment Environmental Assessment Method), a method of assessing the sustainability of buildings
- Brim (disambiguation)
