= Sulejów Reservoir =

- Location within Poland

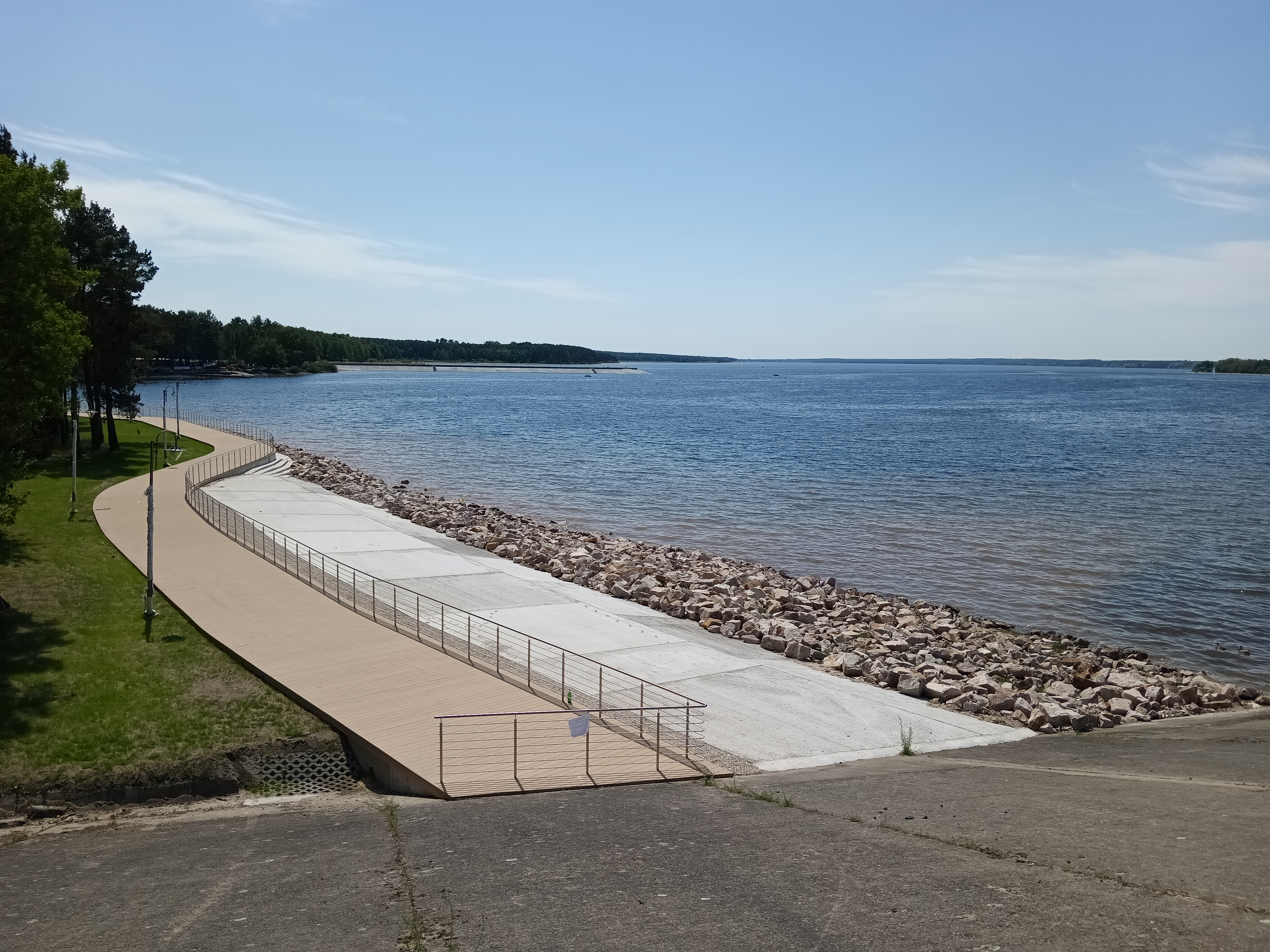
- A fragment of the eastern embankment of the Sulejów Reservoir in the village of Smardzewice. After reconstruction in 2023
- Location: Tomaszów / Opoczno / Piotrków counties in Łódź Voivodeship
- Coordinates: 51°26′0″N 19°56′0″E
- Type: Reservoir
- Primary inflows: Pilica, Luciąża
- Primary outflows: Pilica
- Basin countries: Poland
- Managing agency: Regionalny Zarząd Gospodarki Wodnej w Warszawie
- Built: 1969–1974
- Max. length: 17.1 kilometres (10.6 mi)
- Max. width: 2.1 kilometres (1.3 mi)
- Surface area: 27 square kilometres (6,700 acres)
- Average depth: 3.3 metres (11 ft)
- Max. depth: 11 metres (36 ft)
- Water volume: Full: 75,000,000 m^{3} (61,000 acre⋅ft); Used: 61,000,000 m^{3} (49,000 acre⋅ft)
- Shore length^{1}: 58 kilometres (36 mi)
- Settlements: Tomaszów Mazowiecki, Smardzewice, Sulejów
- ^{1} Shore length is not a well-defined measure.

The Sulejów Reservoir (Polish: Zalew Sulejowski, pronounced [zalɛv sulɛjovski]) is an artificial lake, a reservoir created by a dam, built in the years 1969-1974 in the Łódź Voivodeship of Poland. The second largest water reservoir in the voivodeship. The aim of this reservoir was to supply fresh drinking water to the city of Łódź and Tomaszów Mazowiecki. At full capacity the reservoir contains up to 95,000,000 cubic metres (77,000 acre⋅ft) of water and has an average depth of 3.3 metres (11 ft).

== History ==
The idea of constructing a reservoir on the Pilica river was put forth in the 1960s. The existing water supplies could not fulfill the demand of the growing populations and industries in Łódź and Tomaszów Mazowiecki. At times, water rationing had to be implemented.

=== Water for Łódź ===
The construction began in 1969, 139 kilometres (86 mi) from the outlet of Pilica, into the Vistula river; near Smardzewice. At the time the area was the border between the Łódź and Kielce Voivodeships. A slogan Water for Łódź (Polish: Woda dla Łodzi) was featured on a poster near the dam construction site and in the area where the forest had to be cleared for the future body of water.

A 1,200 metres (0.75 mi) long and 16 metres (52 ft) tall concrete and soil dam was constructed and a total area of 27 square kilometres (6,700 acres) was flooded. To transport the water from the reservoir, a 36.6 kilometres (22.7 mi) long pipeline with a diameter of 1.6 metres (5.2 ft) was built. A section of the pipe between the water treatment plant in Kalinko and a pumping station with storage tank in Chojny has an increased diameter - 2.2 metres (7.2 ft).

=== Early operations ===
The usage of the reservoir started in May 1973; at the time it was the largest body of water in Central Poland. Later that year, the first water delivery to Łódź was completed. In 1977 the pipeline was supplying 258,000 cubic metres (209 acre⋅ft) of water per day, the highest waterworks production in the history of Łódź. By comparison, that volume was 2 to 2.5 times larger than the current usage by the whole city. The construction of a second pipeline with equal capacity was considered, but the decreasing demand from population, declining light industry and availability of other sources have made it redundant.

=== Construction of wells ===
Deep aquifers were discovered and mapped in the village of Bronisławów, near the reservoir's shore. They offered much higher quality water and by the 1990s plans were put in place to replace the reservoir's supply with deep wells. The same pipeline was used, but since 2004 it carries water extracted only from the 7 wells near Bronisławów and the reservoir is no longer used to supply water.

The total production capacity of the well is 50,000 cubic metres (41 acre⋅ft) of water per day and 18,000,000 cubic metres (15,000 acre⋅ft) per year.

=== New pipeline ===
The degrading quality of the old pipeline and reduced needs led to a construction of a new water delivery system. It was constructed in 2009-2010 and partially funded by European Union grants. The old pipeline was cleaned by a tractor with a custom-built elliptical plough and a new, fiberglass pipeline with a diameter of 1.2 metres (3.9 ft) was laid inside the old one.

== Geography ==
The Sulejowski Reservoir is located at 51.43333°N 19.92361°E, an elevation of 159 metres (522 ft). It lies in the Łódź Voivodeship, at the border of Tomaszów, Opoczno and Piotrków Powiats. The Pilica and Luciąża inflows are located at the southern end of the lake in Gmina Sulejów. The dam lies at the north-eastern boundary of the reservoir and the Pilica outflow is located at 51.473971°N 20.006138°E in Gmina Tomaszów Mazowiecki. Parts of the lake and the shoreline are within Gmina Wolbórz and Gmina Mniszków.

== Parks and recreation ==
In addition to the water supply and energy producing functions, Sulejowski Reservoir serves as a center for recreation. There are multiple hotels and vacation homes in the vicinity and watersports infrastructure by the shoreline. The main activities are sailing, windsurfing, kayaking and fishing. The usage of motorboats is forbidden and a quiet zone is enforced across the lake.

A concrete pier has been constructed on the lake near Smardzewice. It will be revitalized in a new project set to begin in 2020. The total funding is 7.2 mln PLN, 4.7 mln of which will be funded by the European Union.

The reservoir lies at the northernmost part of the Sulejów Landscape Park which is centered around the Pilica river and contains protected forests.

There are 2 protected areas defined by the reservoir:

- Direct - all of the reservoir's water, including the former water intake in Bronisławów
- Indirect - a 400 metres (1,300 ft) wide strip of land along the shore

The reservoir has been found to contain less pollution compared with other freshwater environments

== Wildlife ==
The protected area around the reservoir provides habitat for multiple species of wildlife, including:

- Fish: Common roach, Common bream, Common carp, Northern pike, Zander
- Birds: Tern, Black-headed gull, Common pochard, Mallard, Swan

== Gallery ==
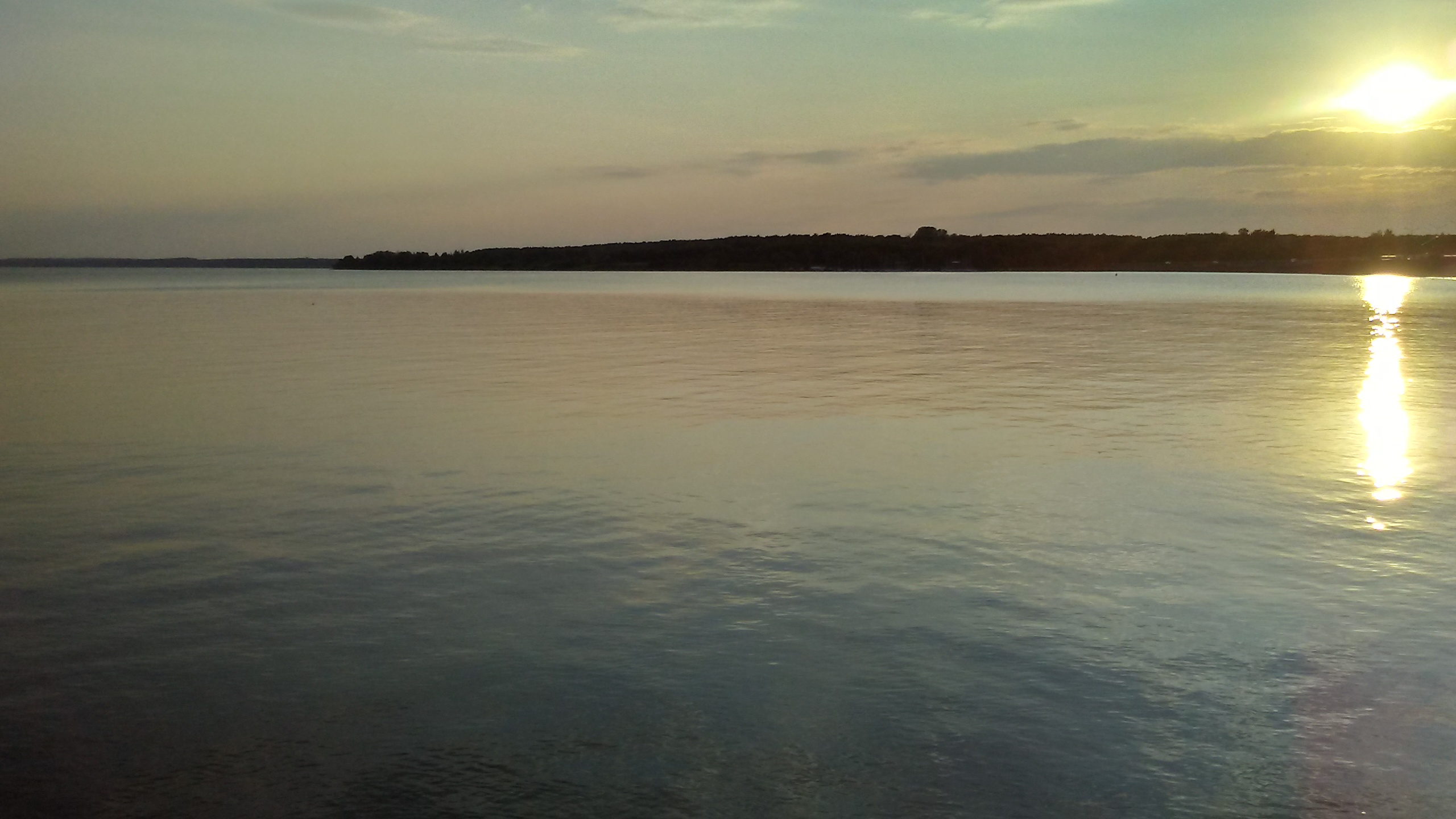

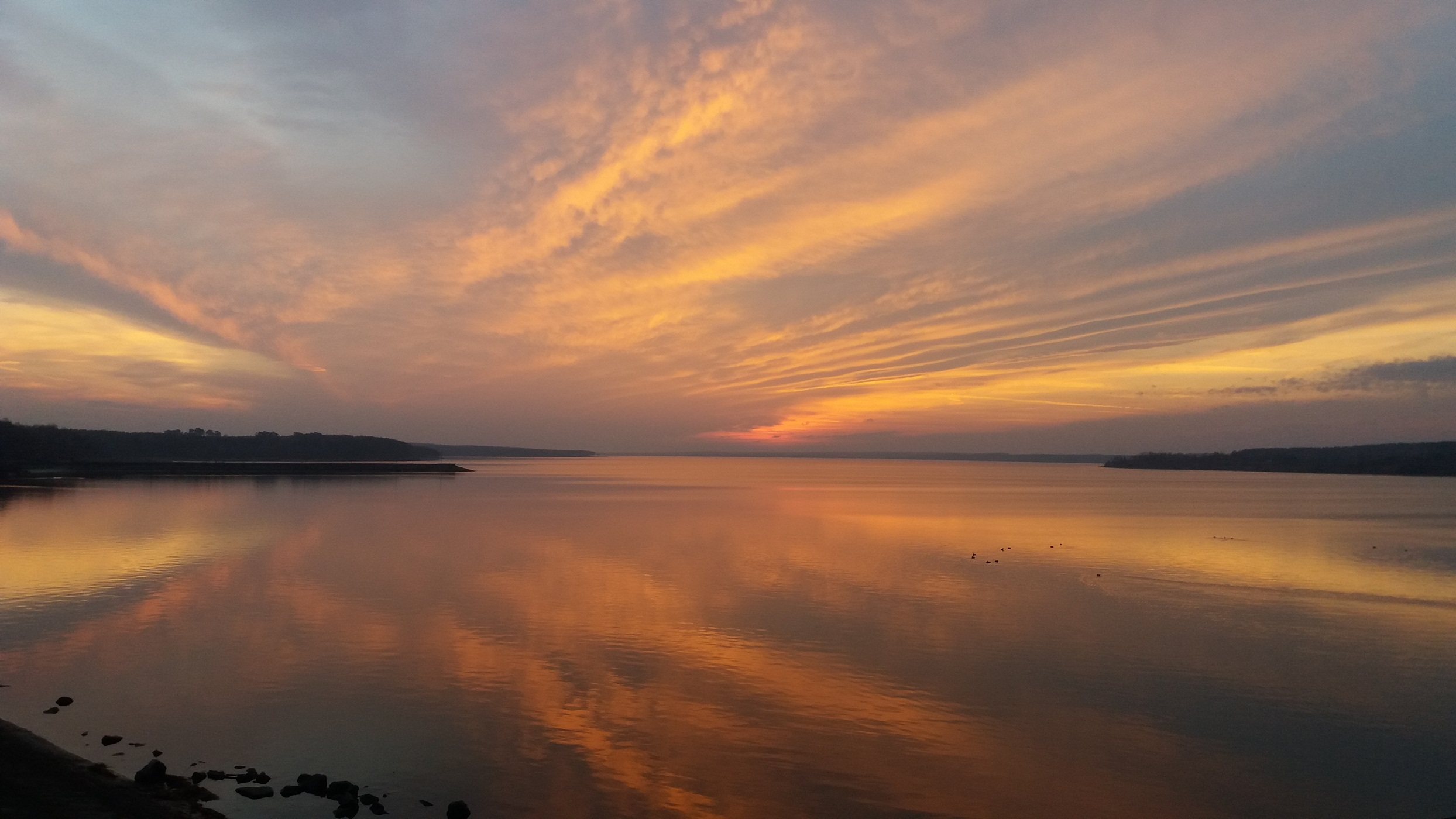

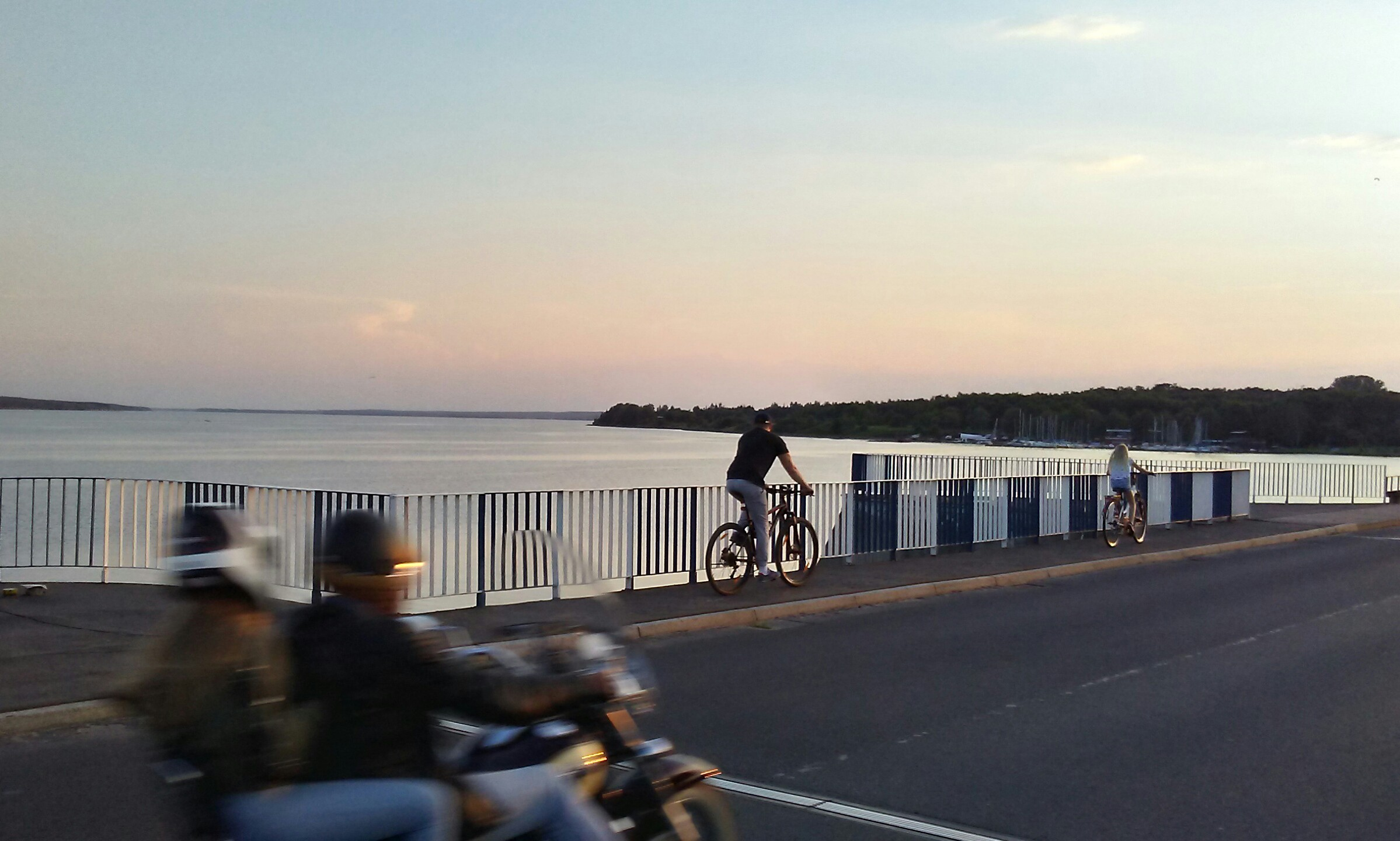

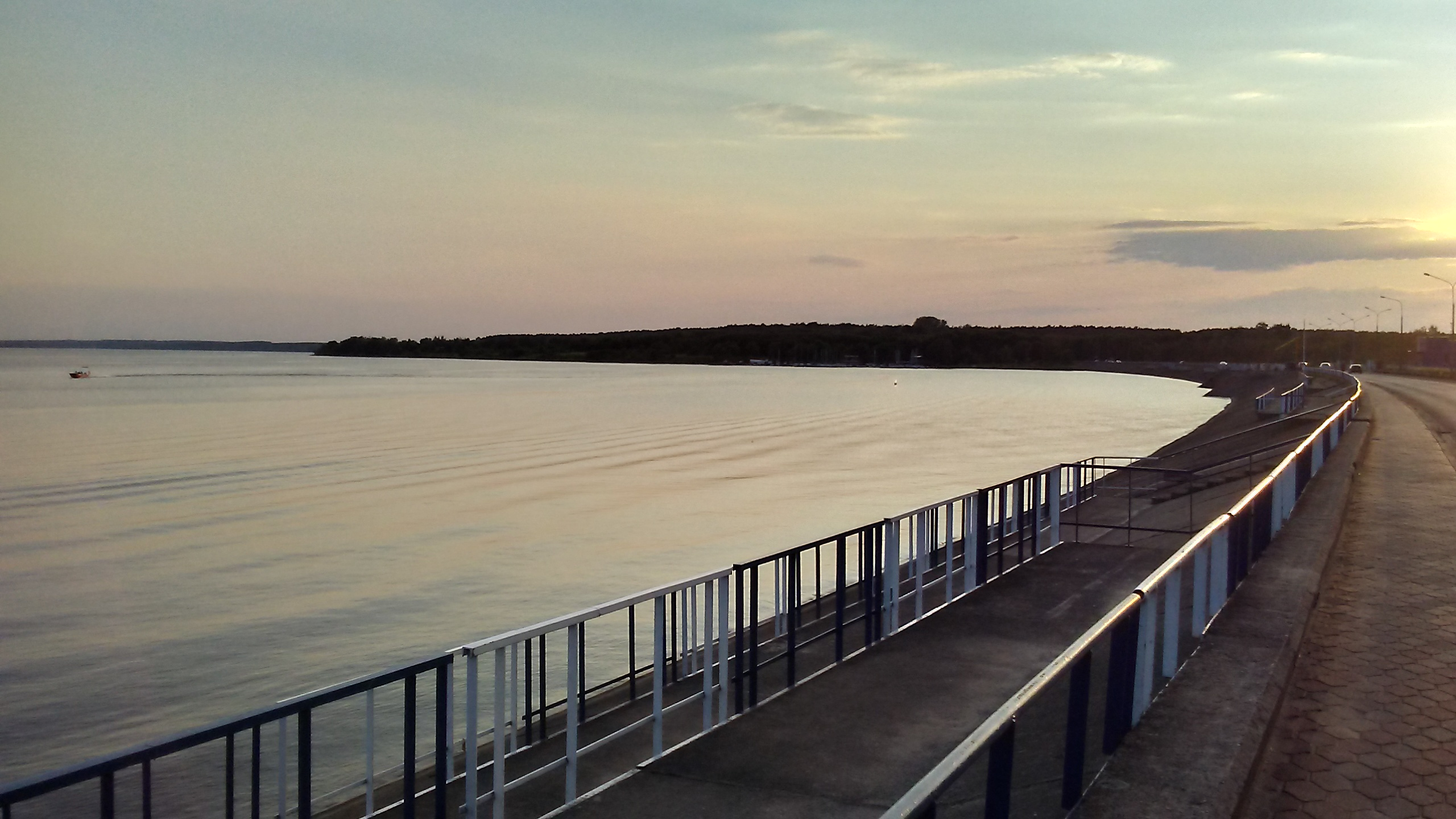

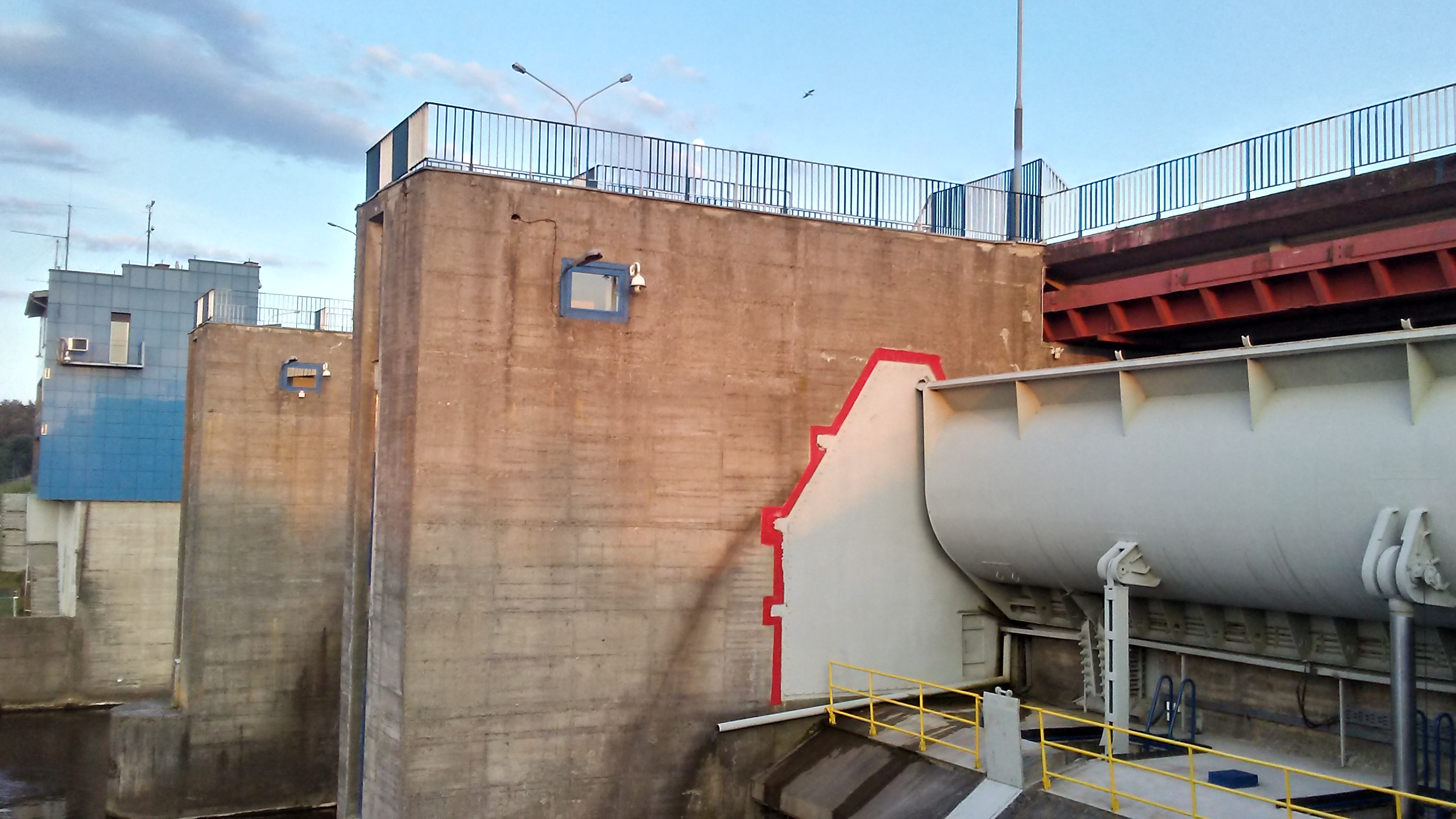

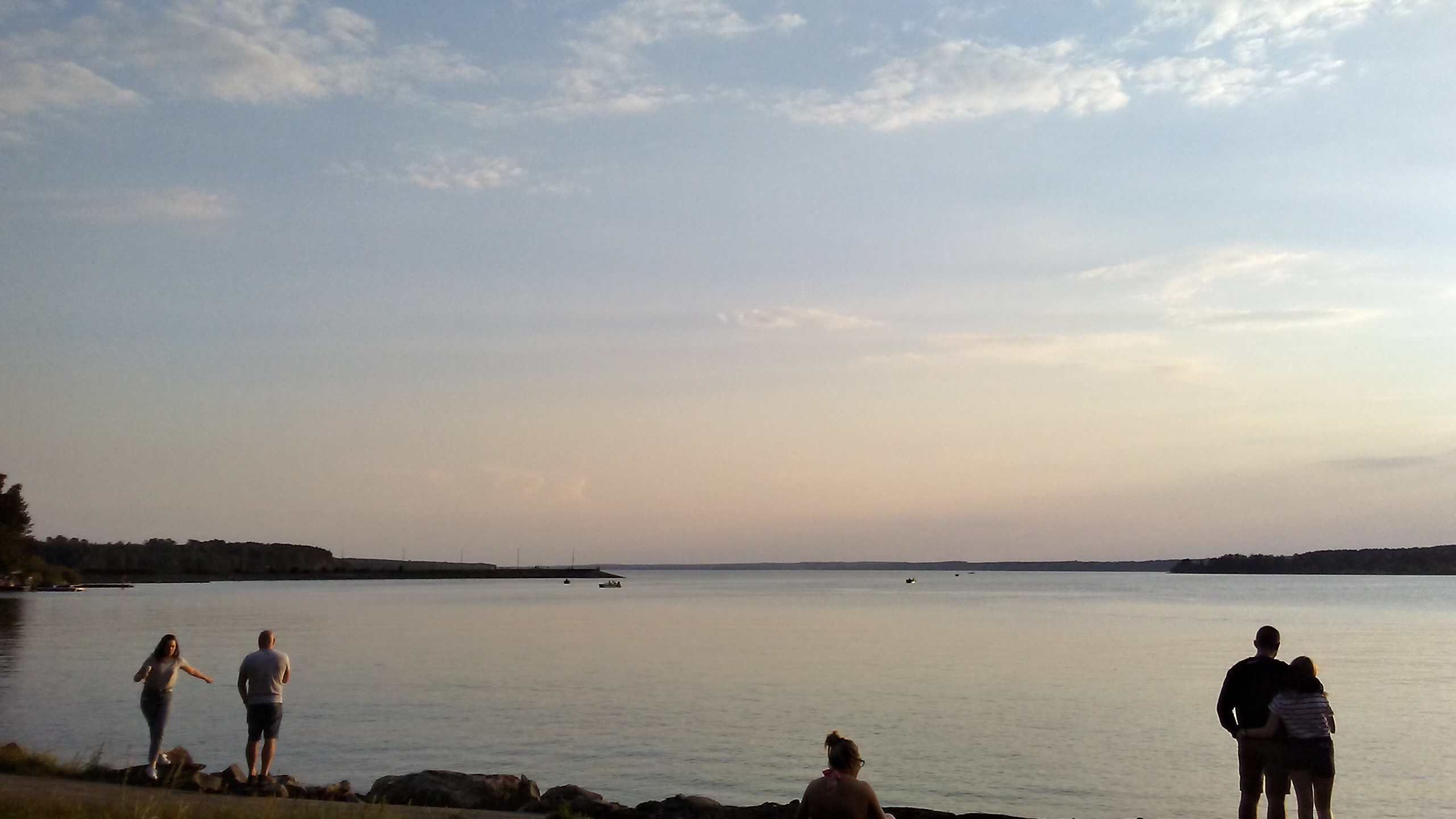

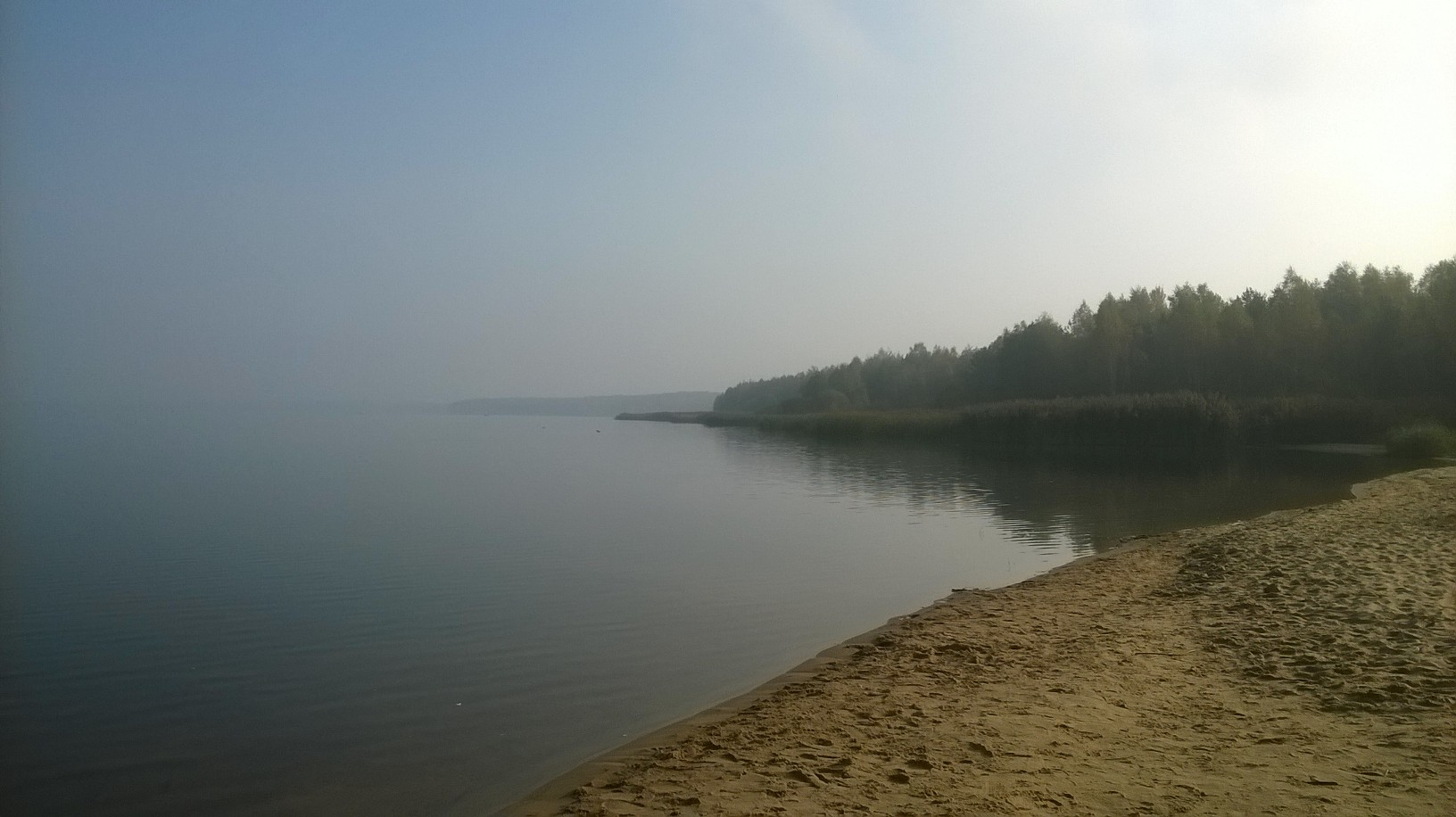

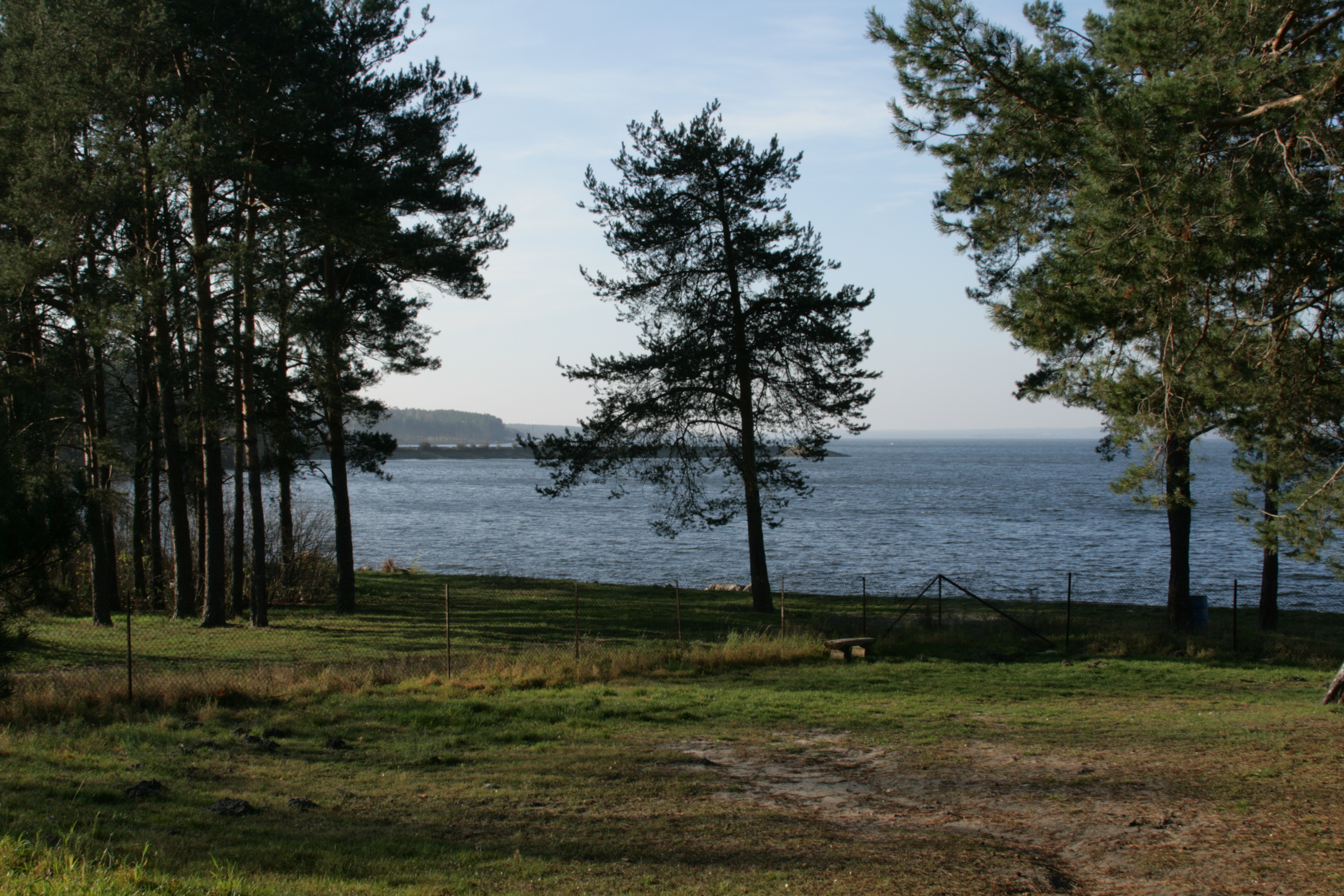

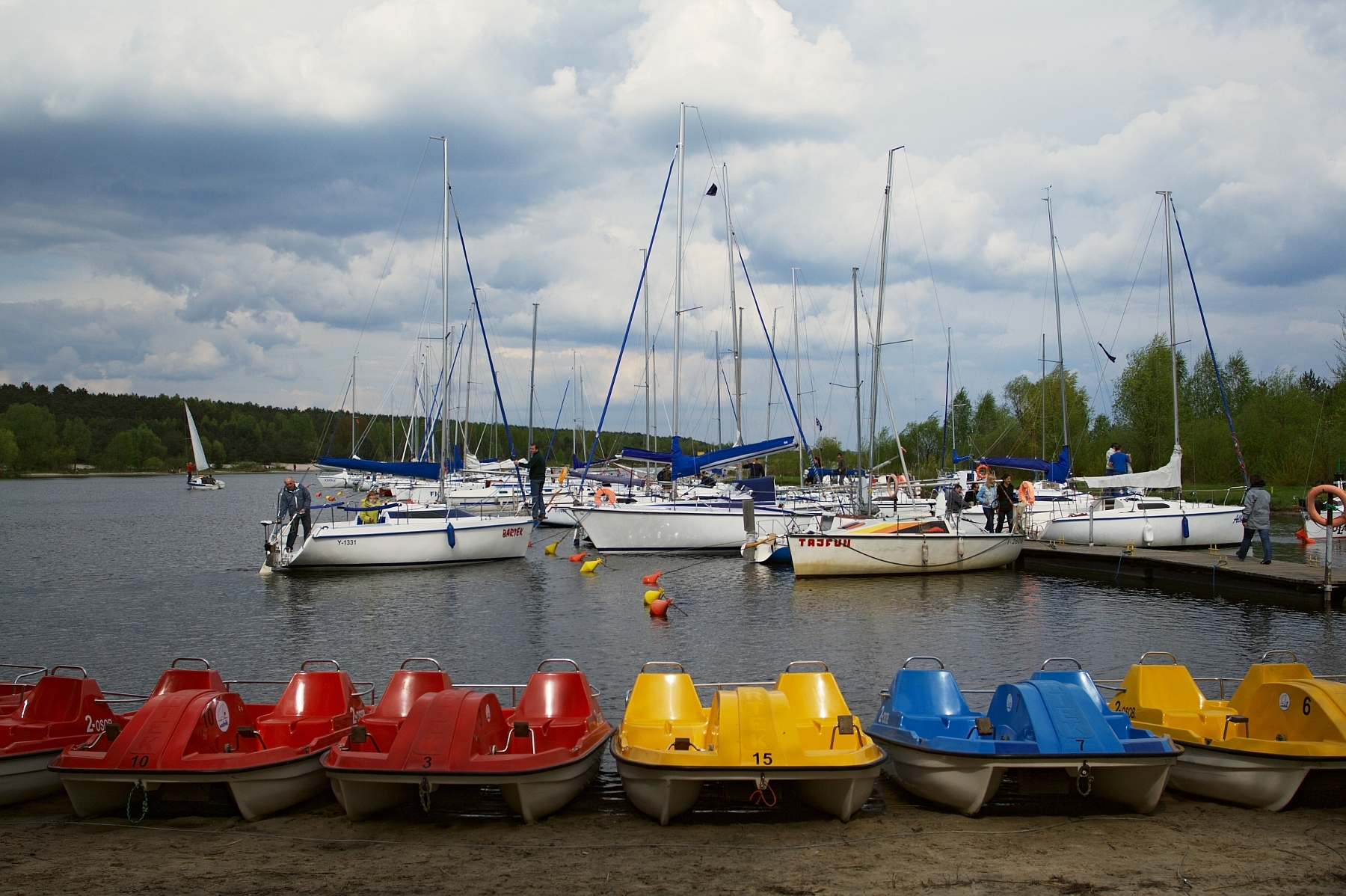

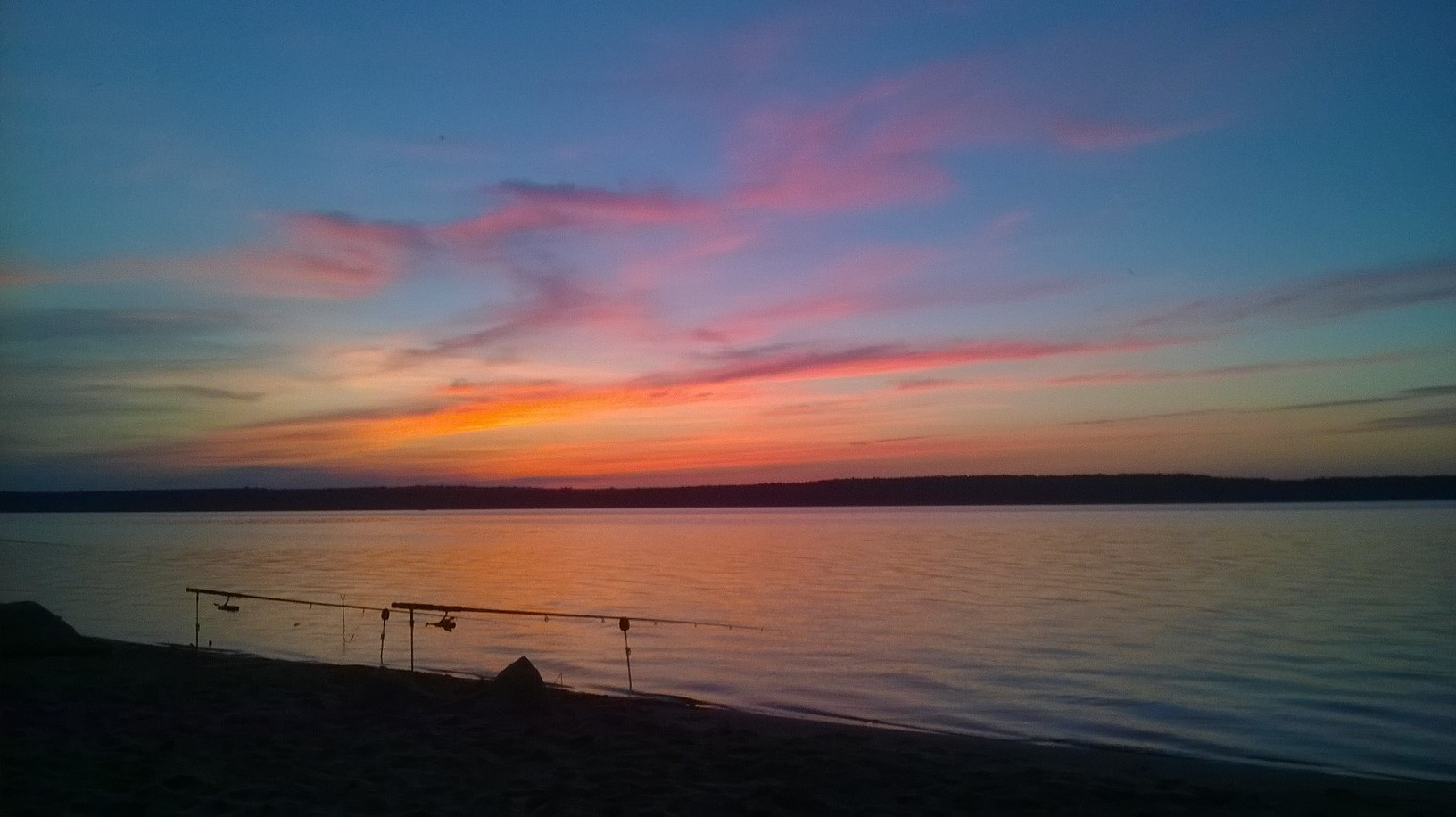

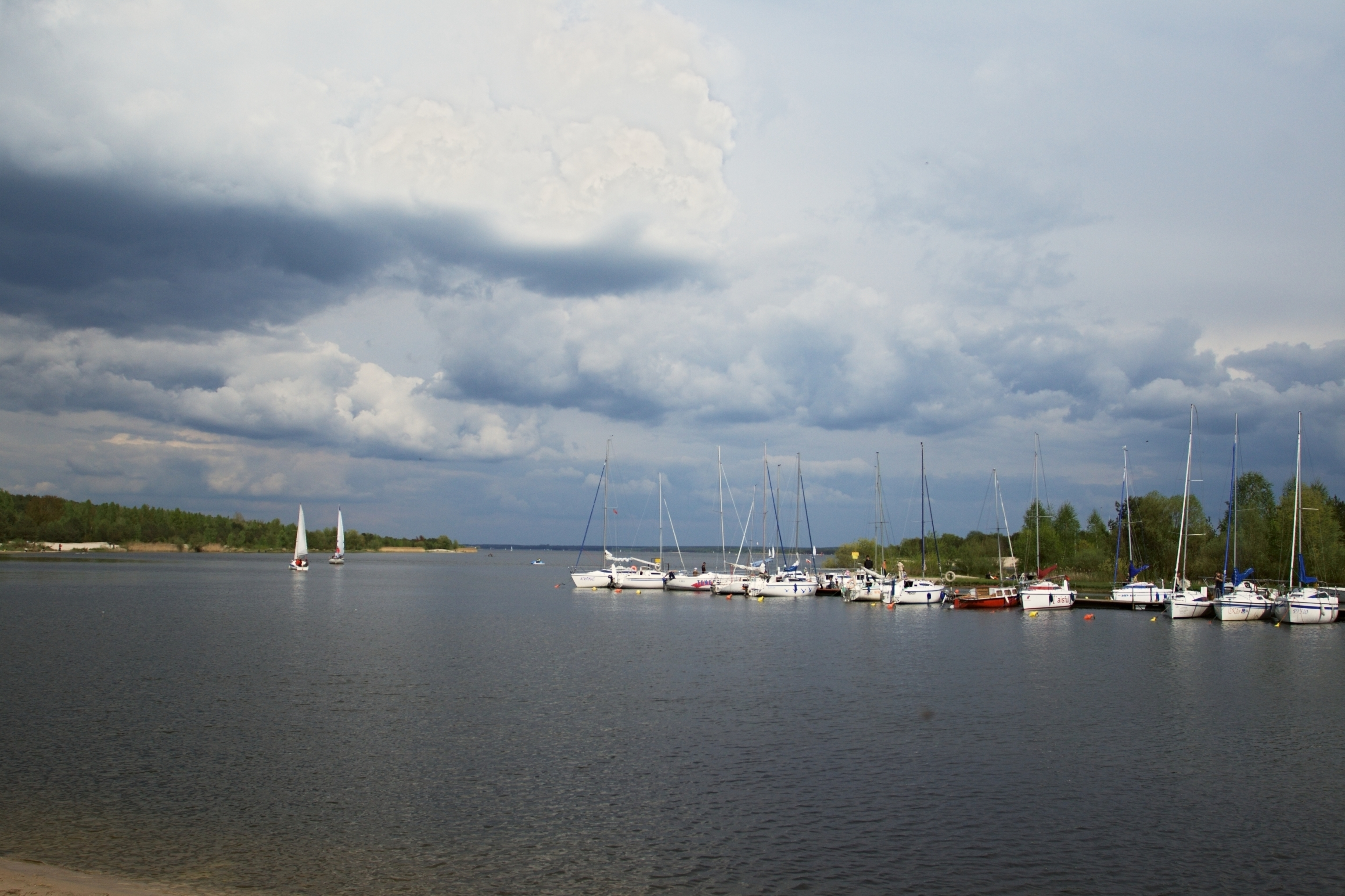

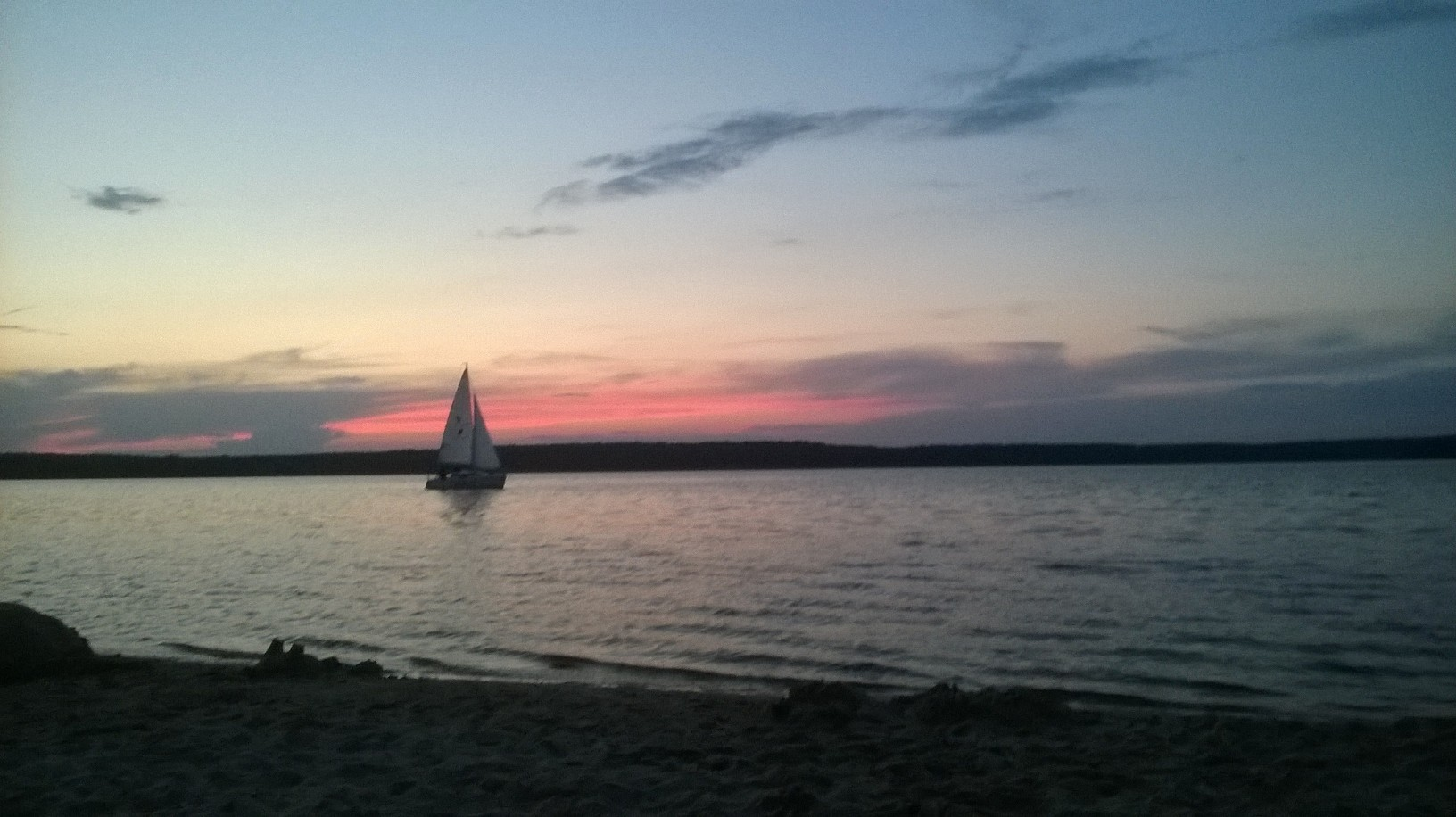

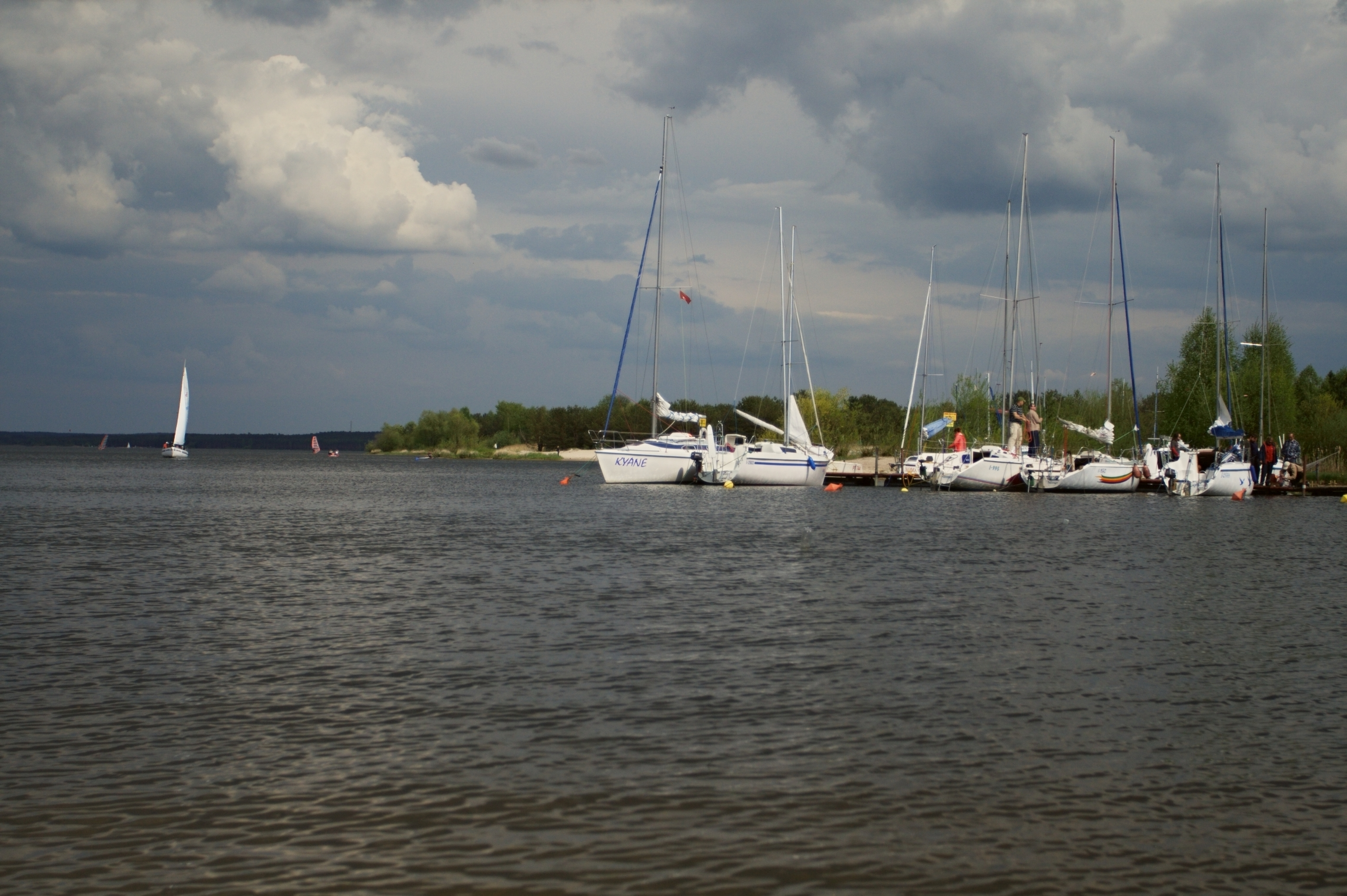

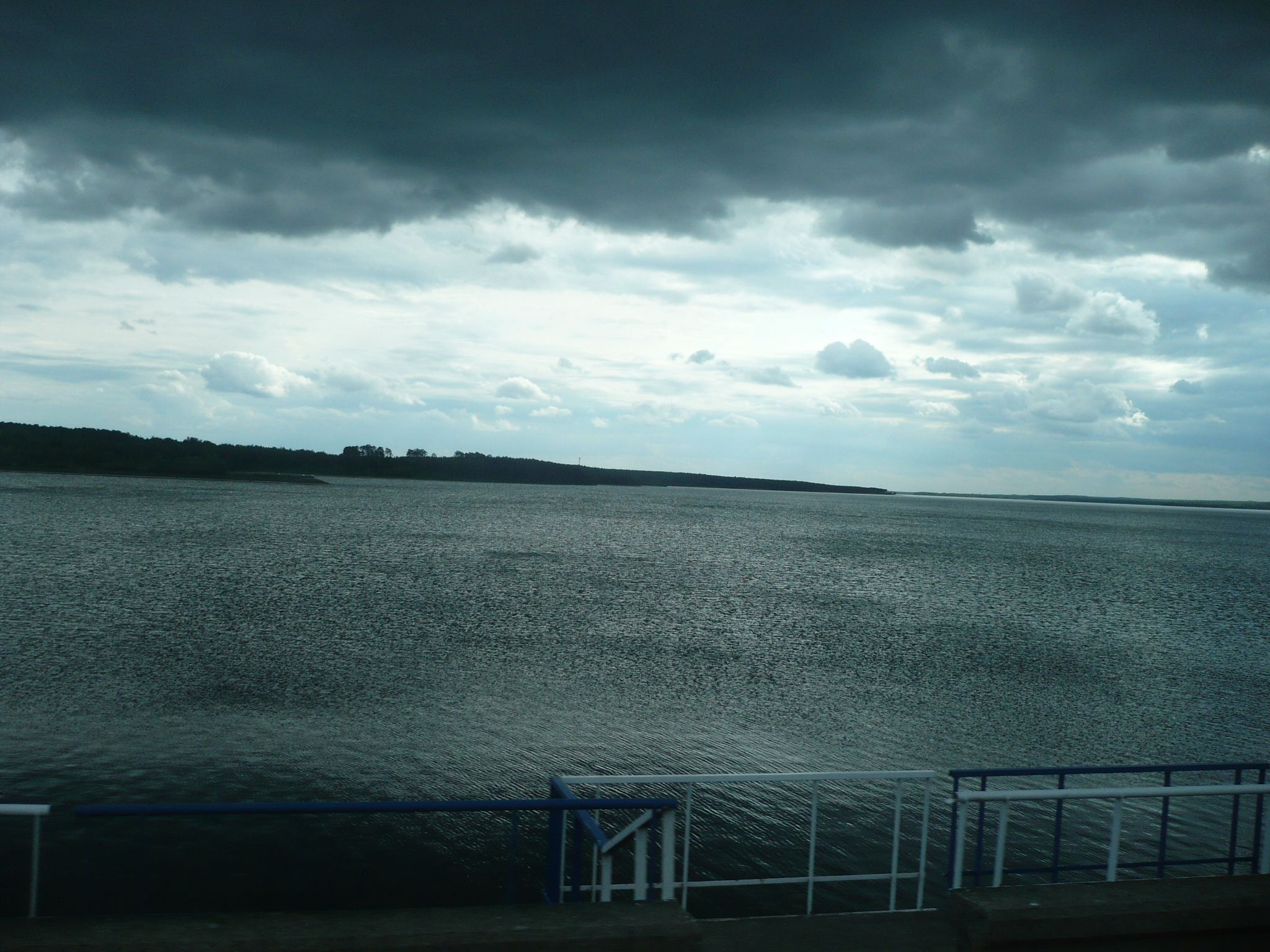

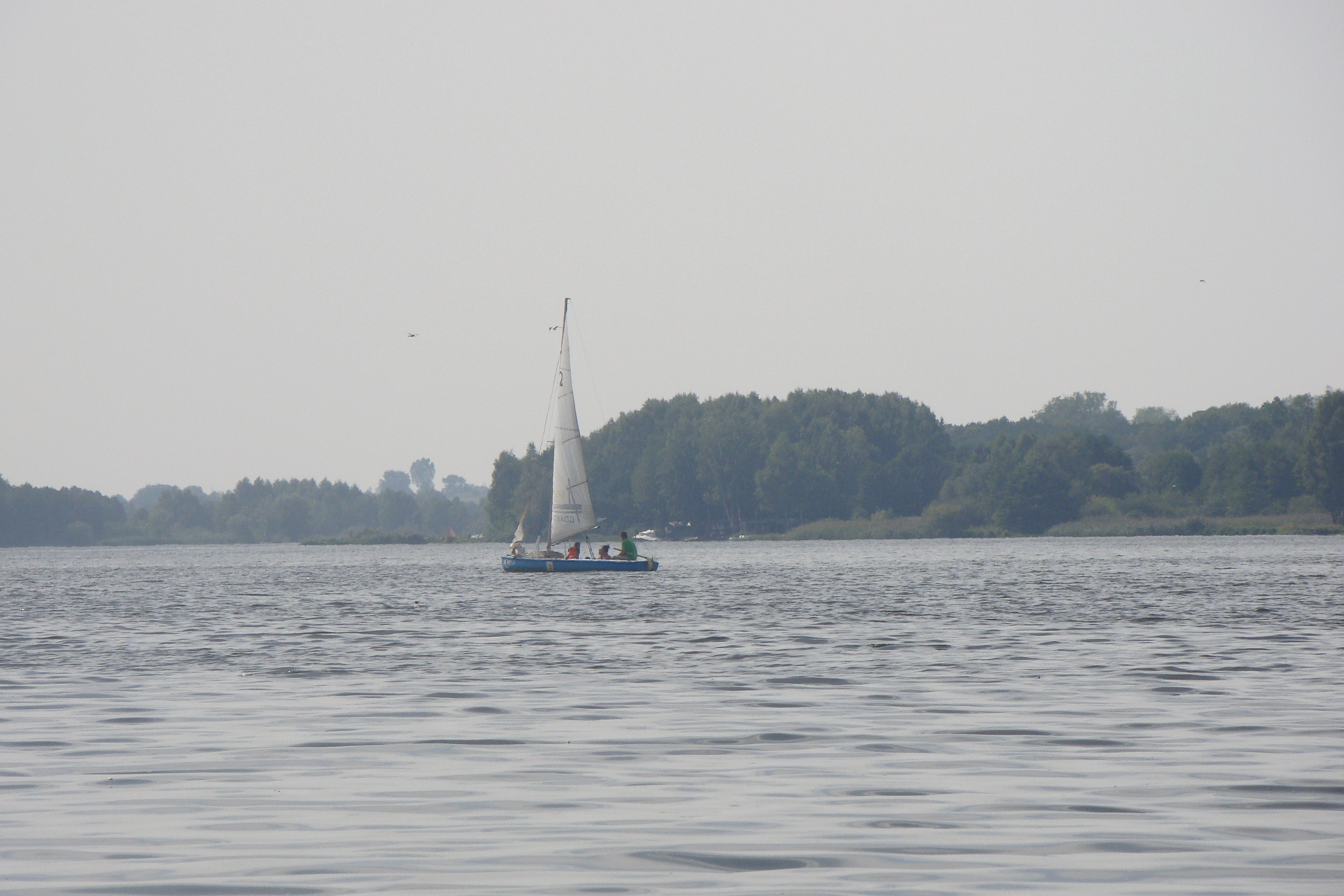

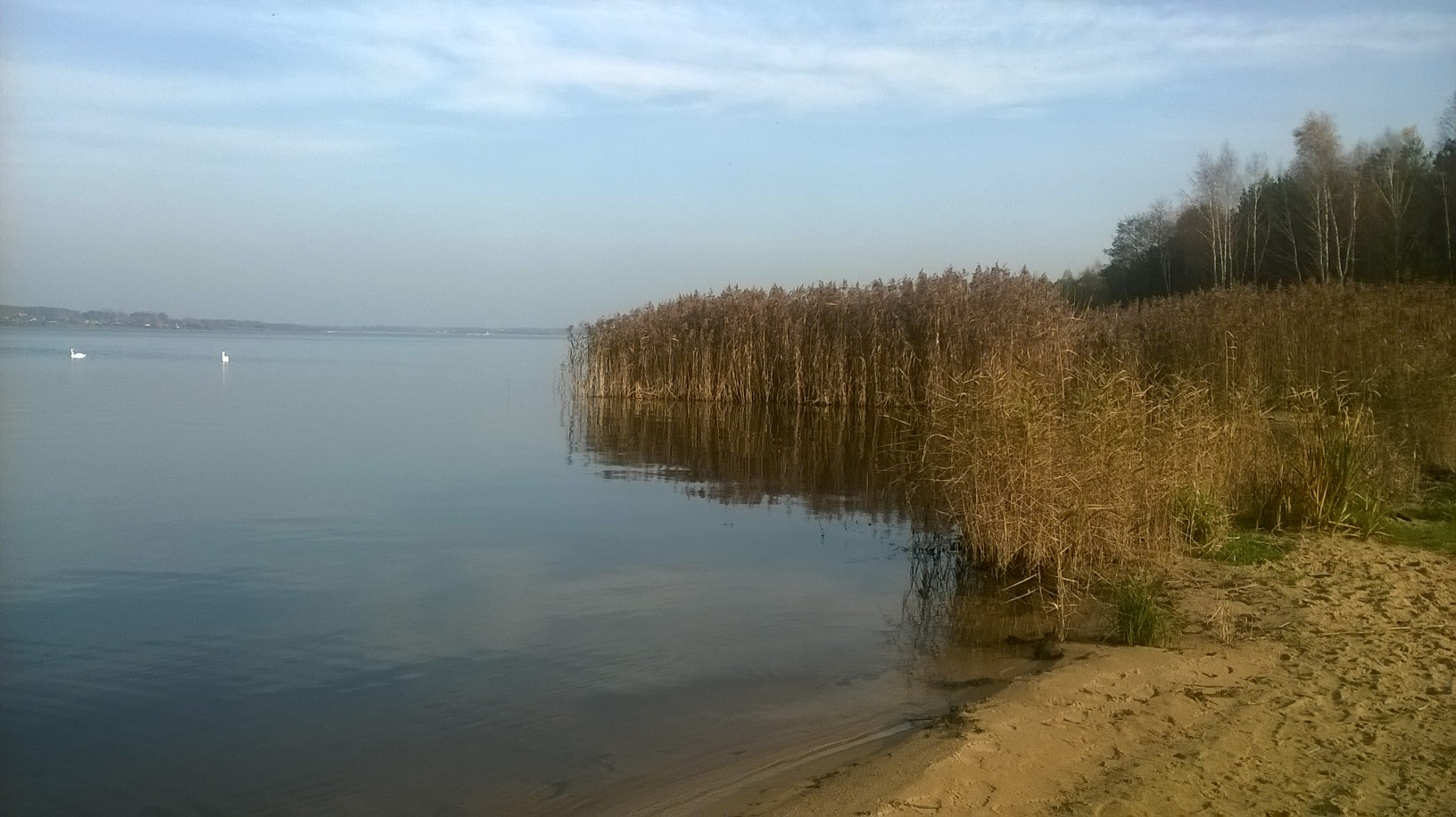

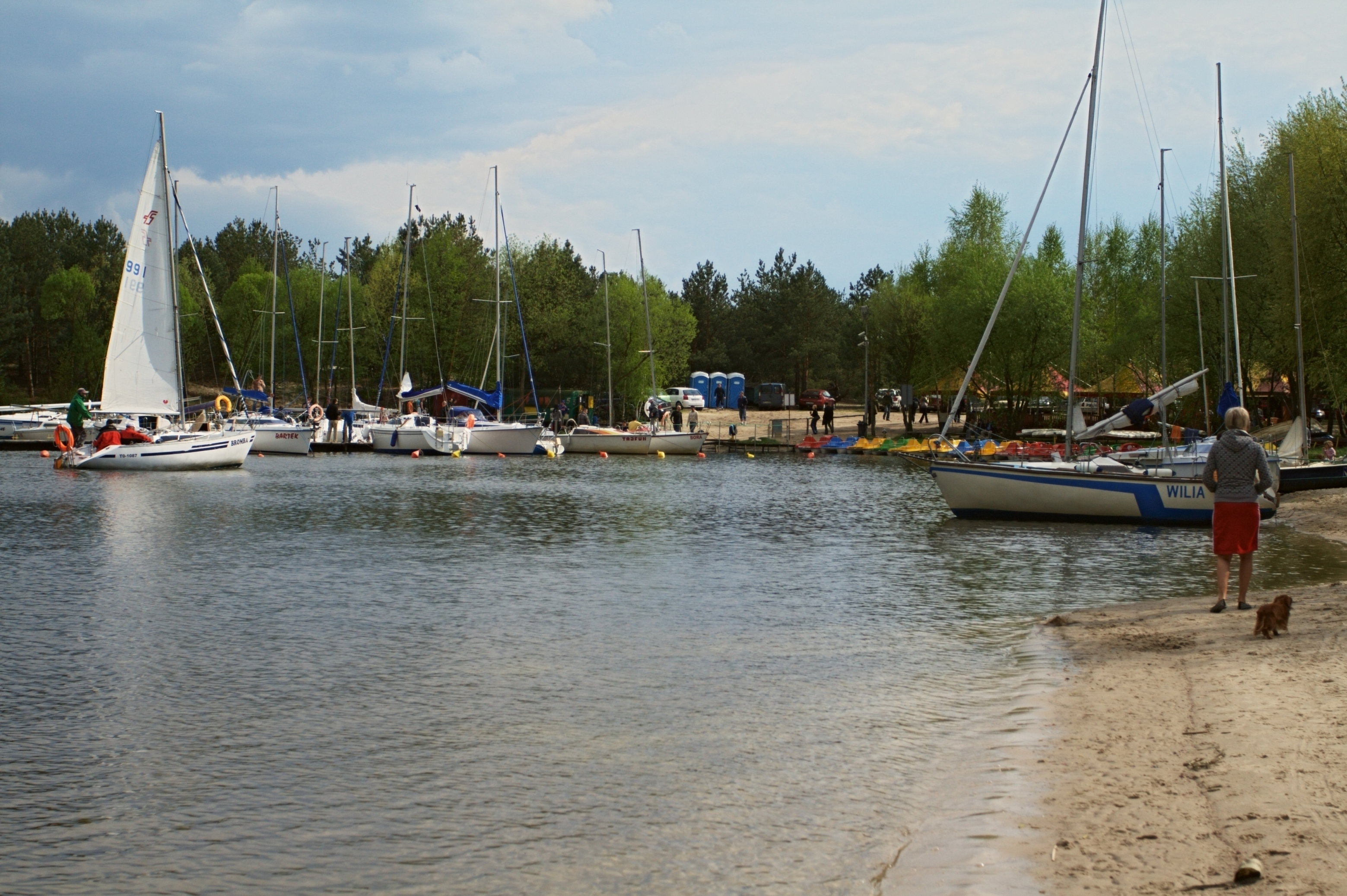

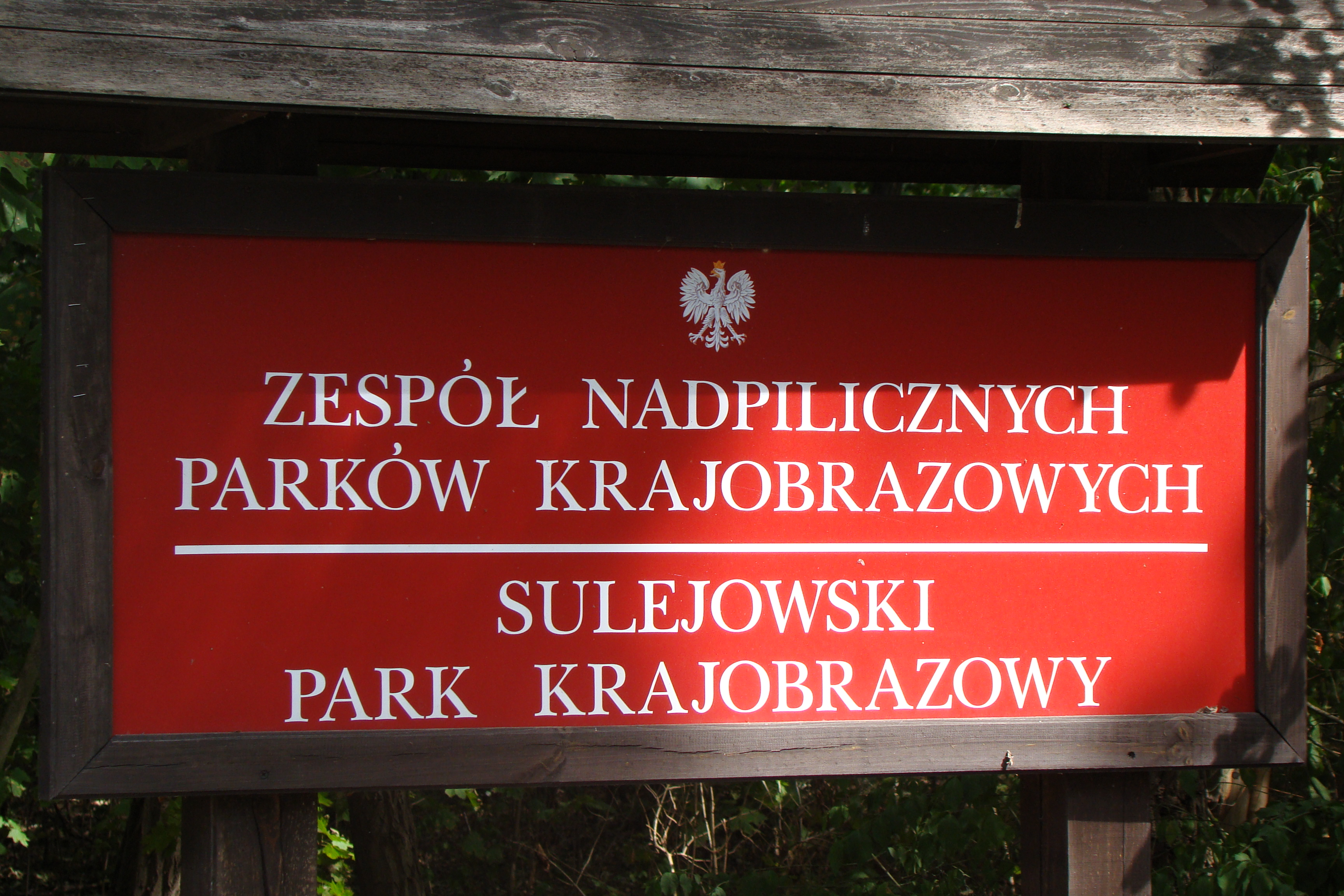

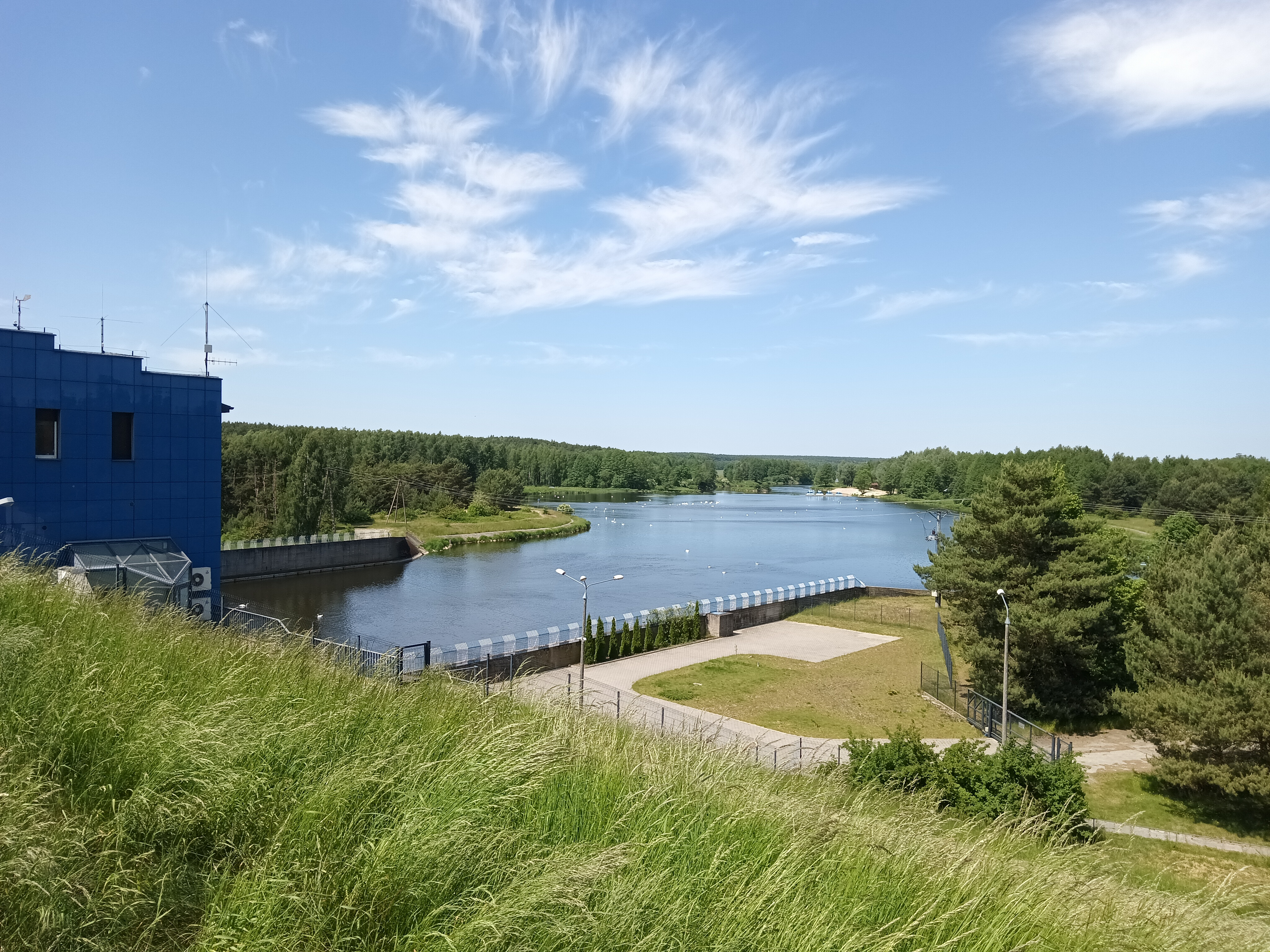

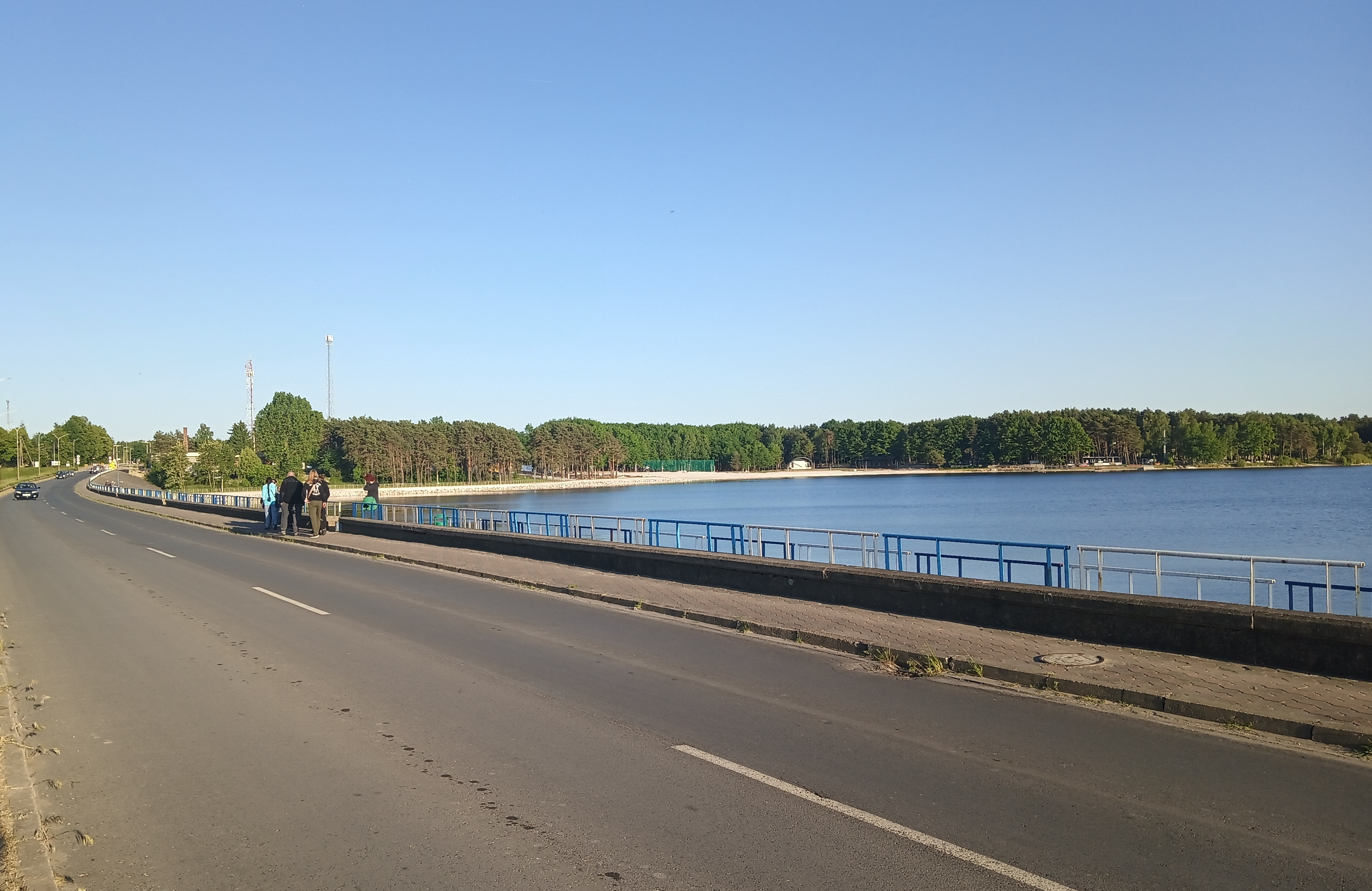
