= List of fishes of Liechtenstein =

Fourteen species of fish are found in the small landlocked central European country of Liechtenstein. Two of these are introduced: the common carp and the rainbow trout.

The following tag notes species in its category:

- (I) – Introduced

== Order Cypriniformes (carps, minnows and relatives) ==
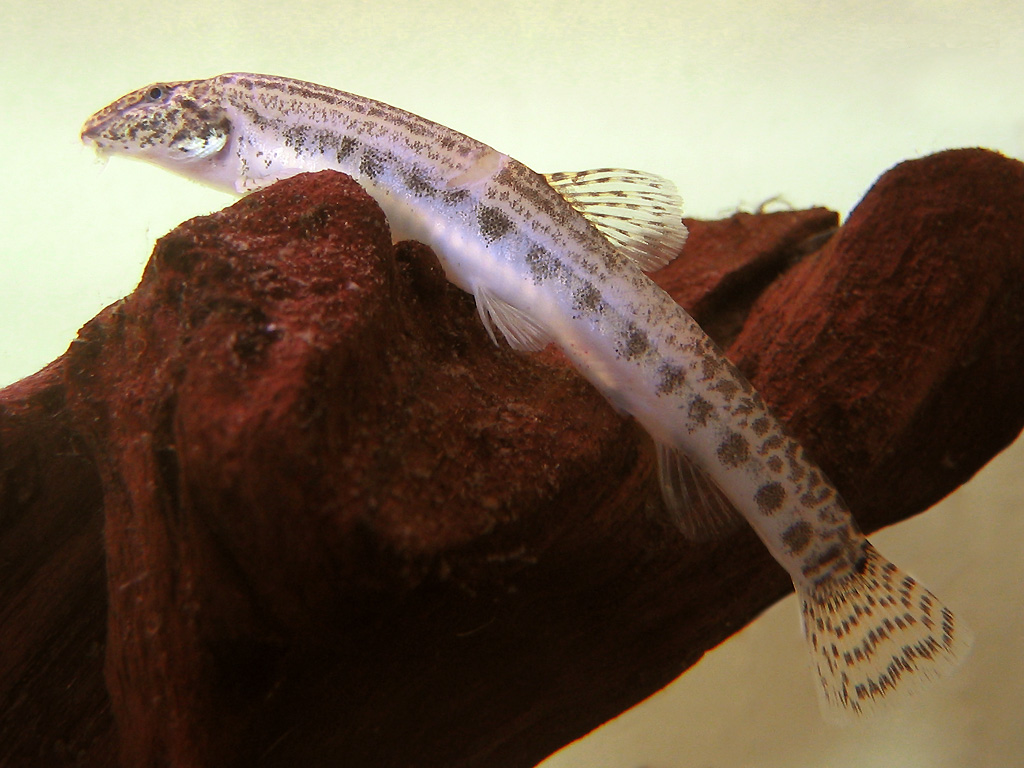
Spined loach

Family Cobitidae (true loaches)

- Spined loach (Cobitis taenia)

Family Nemacheilidae (stone loaches)

- Stone loach (Barbatula barbatula)

Family Cyprinidae (carp and minnows)

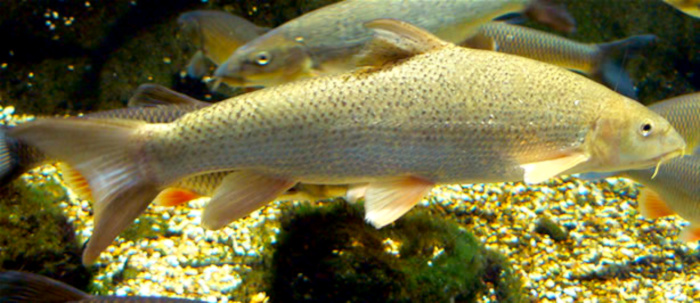
Common barbel

- Common barbel (Barbus barbus)
- Crucian carp (Carassius carassius)
- Common carp (Cyprinus carpio) (I)

Family Leuciscidae (true minnows)

- Common bream (Abramis brama)
- Common bleak (Alburnus alburnus)
- White bream (Blicca bjoerkna)
- Asp (Leuciscus aspius)
- Common minnow (Phoxinus phoxinus)
- Common rudd (Scardinius erythrophthalmus)

== Order Salmoniformes (salmons, trouts, and whitefishes) ==
Family Salmonidae (salmons, trouts, and whitefishes)

- Rainbow trout (Oncorhynchus mykiss) (I)

== Order Perciformes (perch-like fish) ==
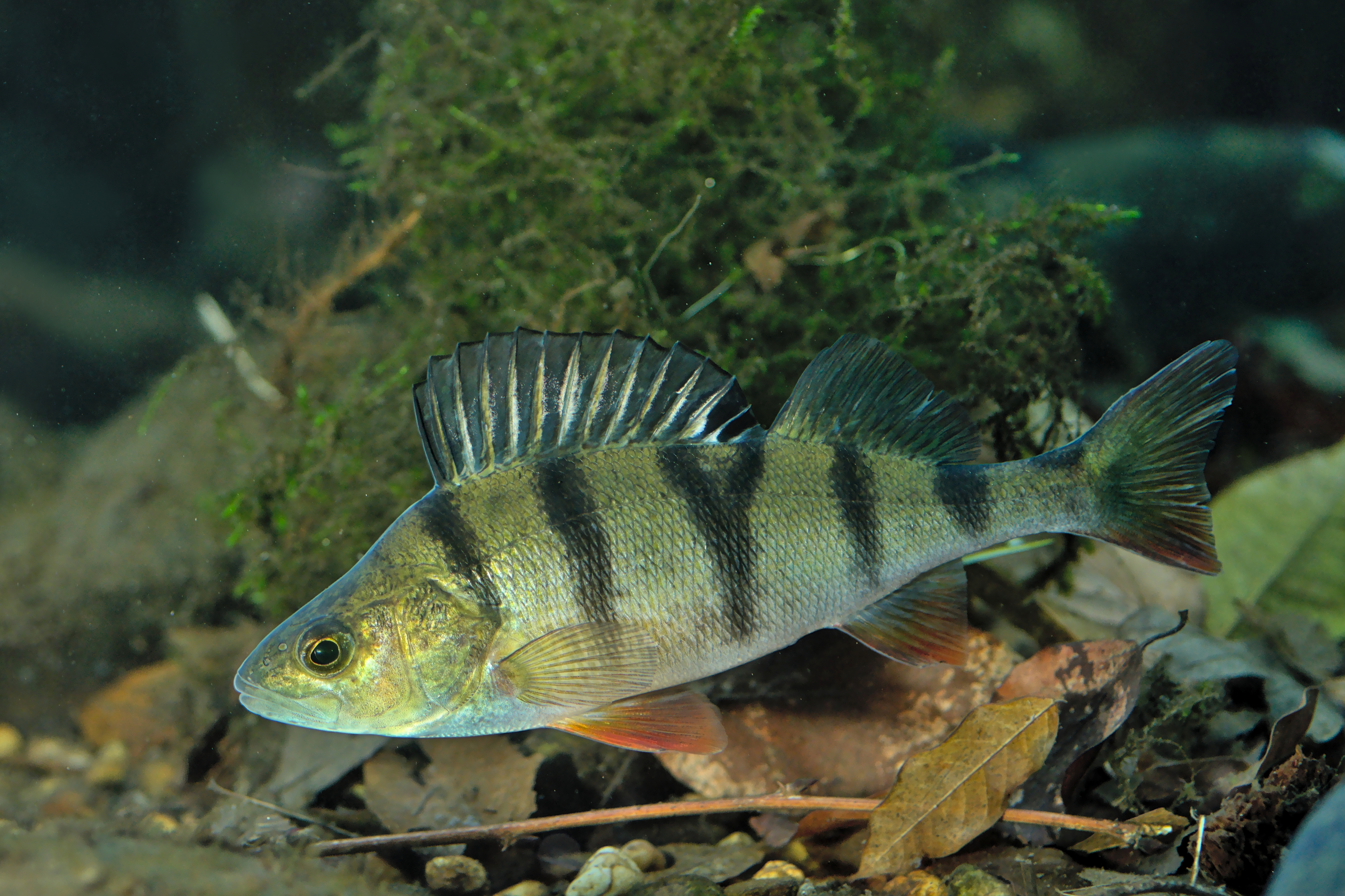
European perch

Family Percidae (perches, darters, and allies)

- European perch (Perca fluviatilis)

Family Cottidae (typical sculpins)

- European bullhead (Cottus gobio)
