= Bream, West Virginia =

Unincorporated community in West Virginia, United States

- Unincorporated community
- Location within West Virginia and the United States Bream (the United States)
- Coordinates: 38°24′12″N 81°31′44″W
- Country: United States
- State: West Virginia
- County: Kanawha
- Time zone: UTC-5 (Eastern (EST))
  - Summer (DST): UTC-4 (EDT)
- GNIS ID: 1553968

Bream is an unincorporated community along Indian Creek Rd (County Route 49) in Kanawha County, West Virginia, United States. It is the first community after State Route 114 turns across the Elk River to Big Chimney. Bream is located between Milliken and Pinch, and is usually omitted from the map, because of its size.

The community was named after Bream Graham, the son of the proprietor of a local mine.
