= HMS Bream =

At least two vessels of the Royal Navy have borne the name HMS Bream after the common European food and game fish (Abramis brama) of the carp family Cyprinidae:

- HMS Bream (1807) was a Ballahoo-class schooner launched in 1807 and sold in 1816.
- HMS Bream (T306) was a Fish-class anti-submarine warfare trawler during World War II.
