= Smardzewice =

- Village
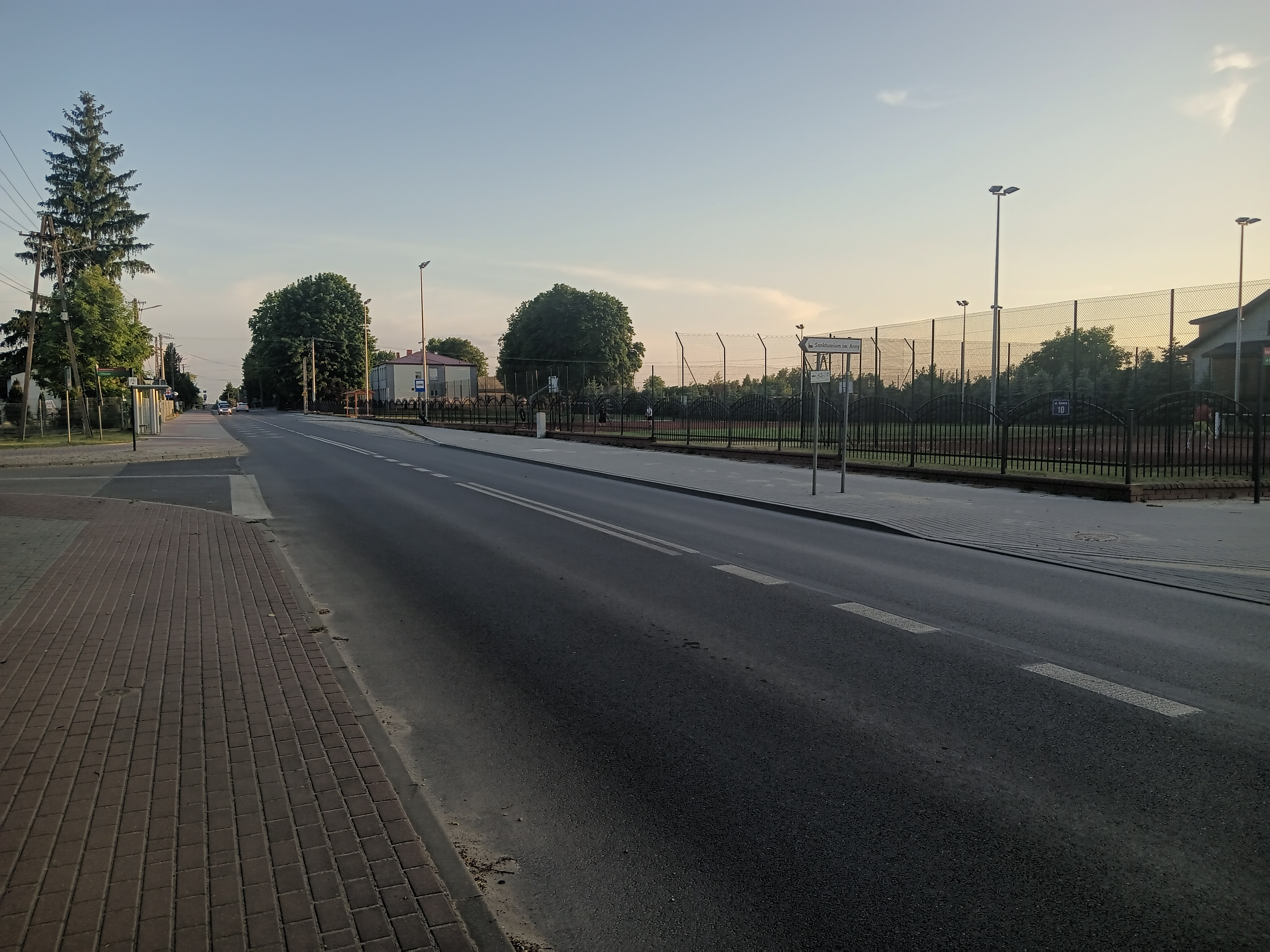
- Główna Street, main street of the village. Bus stops of public transport from Tomaszów Mazowiecki in the background, then a primary school.

- Location within Poland
- Coordinates: 51°29′N 20°2′E
- Country: Poland
- Voivodeship: Łódź
- County: Tomaszów
- Gmina: Tomaszów Mazowiecki

Population
  - Total: 1,700

Smardzewice [smard͡zɛˈvit͡sɛ] is a village in the administrative district of Gmina Tomaszów Mazowiecki, within Tomaszów County, Łódź Voivodeship, in central Poland.
