= Milliken, West Virginia =

- Unincorporated community
- Location within West Virginia and the United States Milliken (the United States)
- Coordinates: 38°24′6″N 81°32′45″W
- Country: United States
- State: West Virginia
- County: Kanawha
- Elevation: 630 ft (190 m)
- Time zone: UTC-5 (Eastern (EST))
  - Summer (DST): UTC-4 (EDT)
- GNIS ID: 1555127

Milliken is an unincorporated community in Kanawha County, West Virginia, United States. It was also known as Greenberry.
