= Bronisławów, Tomaszów County =

Bronisławów
- Village
- Location within Poland
- Coordinates: 51°36′30″N 19°53′11″E
- Country: Poland
- Voivodeship: Łódź
- County: Tomaszów
- Gmina: Ujazd

Bronisławów [brɔniˈswavuf] is a village in the administrative district of Gmina Ujazd, within Tomaszów County, Łódź Voivodeship, in central Poland.
