= Bream Wood =

Protected area in East Sussex, England

Coordinates: 51.074°N 0.173°E

- Site of Special Scientific Interest
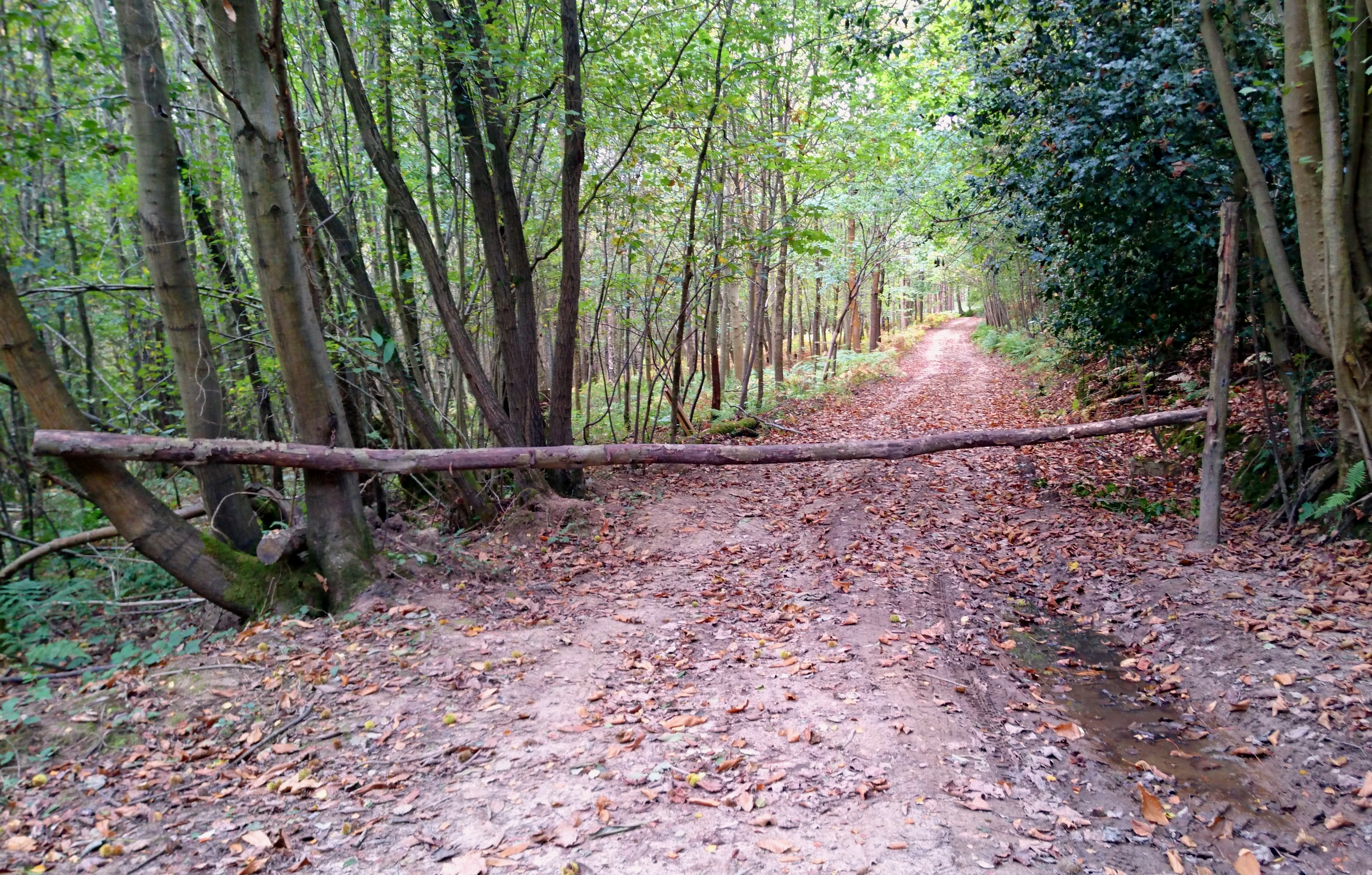
- Location of Bream Wood.
- Area of search: East Sussex
- Grid reference: TQ 523 328
- Interest: Biological
- Area: 7.8 hectares (19 acres)
- Notification date: 1985
- Location map: Magic Map

Bream Wood is a 7.8-hectare (19-acre) biological Site of Special Scientific Interest north of Crowborough in East Sussex.

This steep sided valley wood has several locally rare ferns and mosses. There are a number of small ponds and acid springs and flora include the rare moss Dicranodontium denudatum at one of only two known locations in south-east England. The dry upper slopes have ancient woodland.

The site is private land with no public access.
