= Red bream =

Red bream may refer to:

- Rose fish
- Pacific ocean perch
- Australasian snapper
