= Bream (surname) =

Bream is a surname. Notable people with the surname include:

- Freda Bream (1918–1996), New Zealand novelist
- Henry T. Bream (1899–1990), American minor league baseball player
- Julian Bream (1933–2020), British classical guitarist and lutenist
- Shannon Bream (born 1970), American journalist and attorney
- Sid Bream (born 1960), American baseball player
