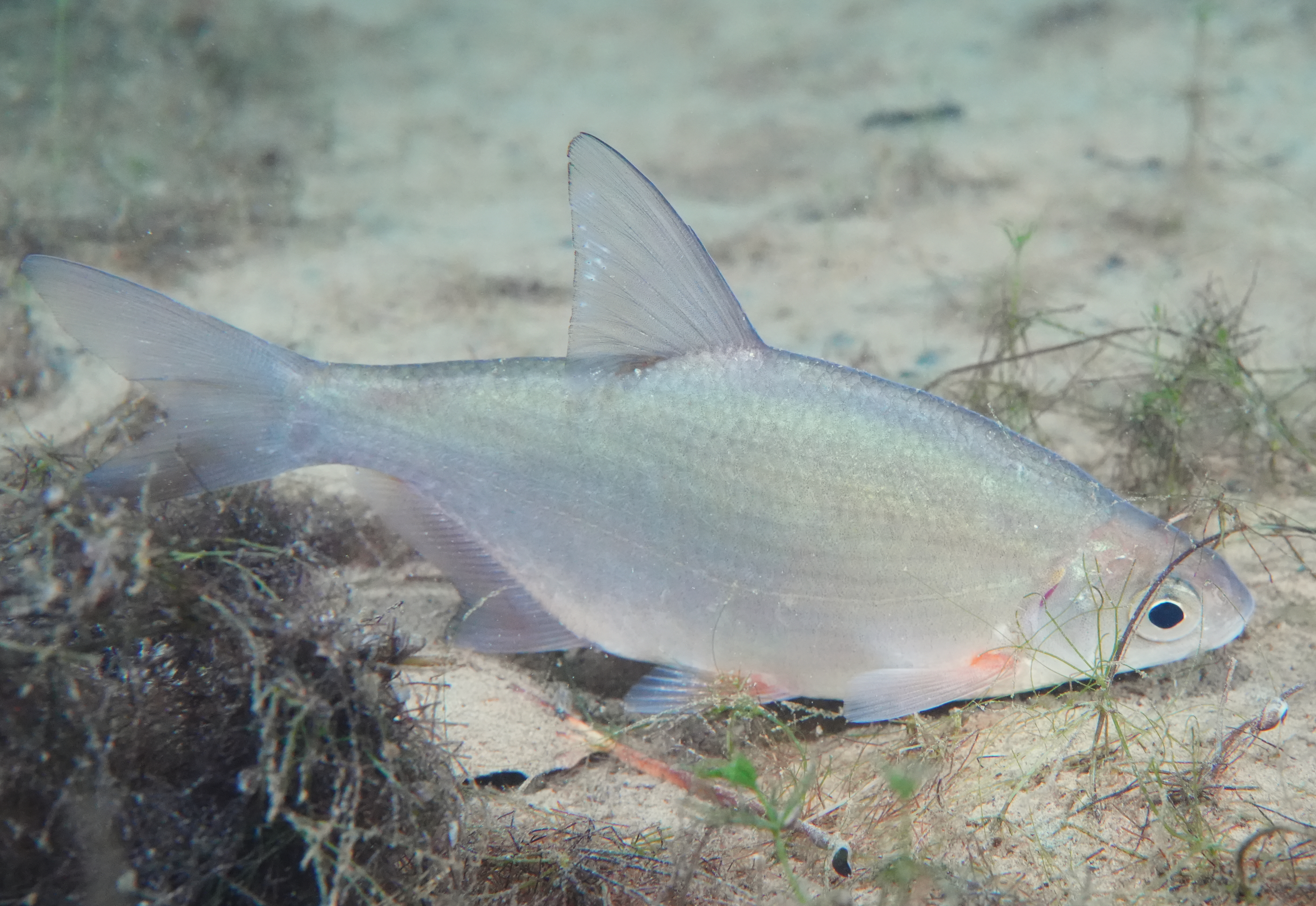

Conservation status
- Least Concern (IUCN 3.1)

Scientific classification
- Kingdom: Animalia
- Phylum: Chordata
- Class: Actinopterygii
- Division: Teleostei
- Order: Cypriniformes
- Family: Leuciscidae
- Subfamily: Leuciscinae
- Genus: Blicca; Heckel, 1843
- Species: B. bjoerkna

Binomial name
- Blicca bjoerkna (Linnaeus, 1758)

Synonyms
- Abramis bjoerkna Linnaeus, 1758; Cyprinus bjoerkna Linnaeus, 1758

= Blicca =

Species of fish

Blicca is a monospecific genus of freshwater ray-finned fish belonging to the family Leuciscidae. The only species in the genus is Blicca bjoerkna, the white bream or silver bream. This species is found in Europe and Western Asia.

== Distribution ==
Blicca bjoerkna is distributed across most of Europe and in adjacent Western Asia. The natural distribution, though, excludes peripheral areas such as northern Sweden, northern Finland and Norway, and most parts of the British Isles (except Southern England), as well as the Iberian and Italian peninsulas. Introduced populations occur also in Spain and Italy. The Asian distribution is in the Caspian Sea and Aral Sea basins, and in Anatolian Black Sea drainages.

== Description ==
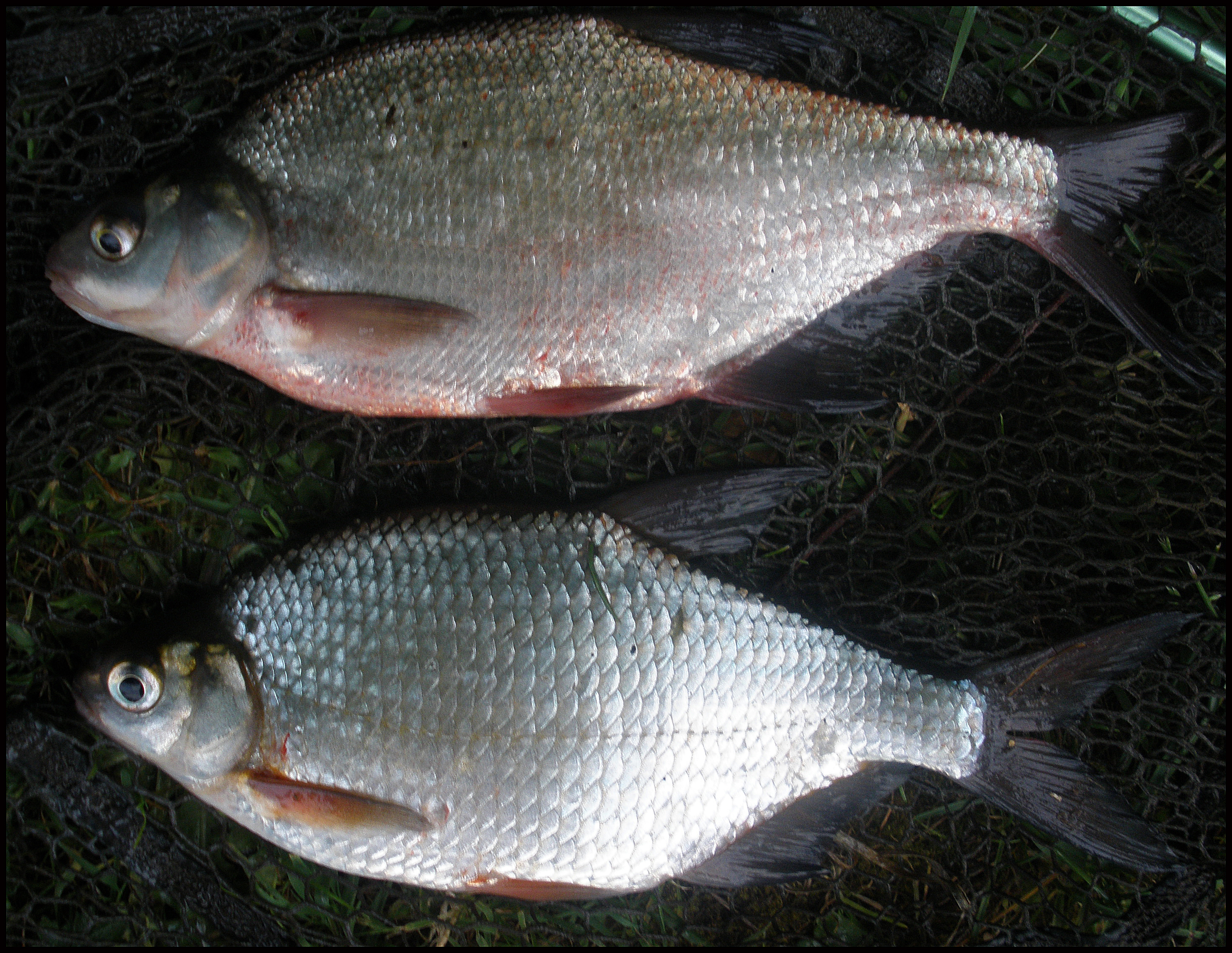
Top, immature bronze bream. Bottom, mature silver bream.

Small silver bream are very similar in overall appearance to the immature common, or bronze bream, Abramis brama, but can be distinguished by their larger scales. Counting the scale rows from the front of the dorsal fin to the lateral line, and including the lateral line scale, is the most reliable first step in determining the species. Bronze bream have 13 scales or more, while silver bream have 9–11. The lateral line scale count for silver bream is 44–49, while for bronze bream it is 49 and above, and usually well above 50.

Larger specimens are far easier to discern, because of marked differences in color and body shape. By the time both species attain sexual maturity, they become relatively easy to tell apart. The silver bream's scales remain a bright, highly reflective, silver colour all their lives, whilst the scales of the bronze bream begin to take on a variety of hues, from dark brown to a light ochre yellow. However, some bronze bream do remain a silvery colour all their lives, depending upon habitat. Confusion arises when sexually mature silver bream and sexually immature bronze bream are cursorily compared in the field, because bronze bream grow to the same size as sexually mature silver bream very quickly whilst still very young, and when they are almost invariably a silver colour themselves.

The maximum weight a silver bream varies with the habitat quality, but in optimum conditions can be 1.6 kg (3 lb 8 oz). Nevertheless, in normal conditions, most silver bream never exceed 0.45 kg (1 lb), and in small ponds not even 0.3 kg (11 oz).

The body shape in males and females is subtly different. The female is less compressed than the male, has a rounded form by comparison, and is a little deeper overall, often with a pronounced bulge of the chest. The male is slimmer, and far more compressed. The bulge in the chest is absent, and he may only be two-thirds the width of a comparative female of the same length, and consequently may weigh far less. The male's head is quite pointed and the snout appears slightly upturned, whilst the female's head is rounder with a snub nose. In the breeding season, males become covered in tubercles and often display a reddish flush on their bellies and intense vermilion pectoral and ventral fin colouration, whilst all other fins can become very dark and opaque. The females, at the same time, can become very rotund and deep set.

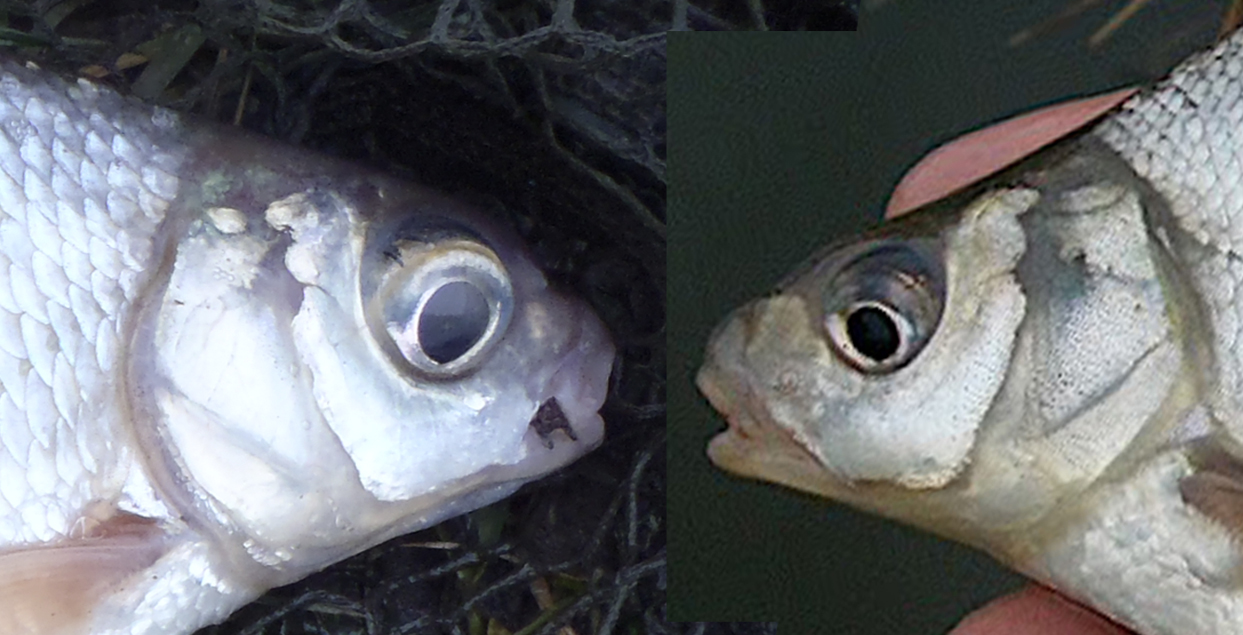
Left, mature silver bream. Right, immature bronze bream.

The eye of a silver bream is very large by comparison with its head, and this characteristic also distinguishes it from the bronze bream, as well as from all other European fishes in the family Leuciscidae apart from the bleak. The eye is round and protruding, with a yellowish cornea and black iris. Head length from tip of snout to far extent of gill plate is about four times the eye diameter, and head depth is over twice as large, irrespective of the age of the fish. In bronze bream, the relationship between eye size and head length changes considerably over the lifetime of the fish, being initially similar to the ratios in silver bream, but in full-grown fish, the head length can be as much as six to seven times eye width, and head depth four to five times. The measurements are taken along lines bisecting the eye in both directions. The eye is also set very close the end of the snout, and close to the top of the head, but in bronze bream, this is far less the case.

Silver bream have light pink to vermilion pectoral and ventral fins. The anal fin is transparent grey to dark grey, as are the deeply forked caudal fin and the dorsal fin. The anal fin has 21–23 branched rays.

Silver bream rarely have mucus on their bodies, and if they do, the amount is small. In contrast, bronze bream are often very slimy, especially when young.
