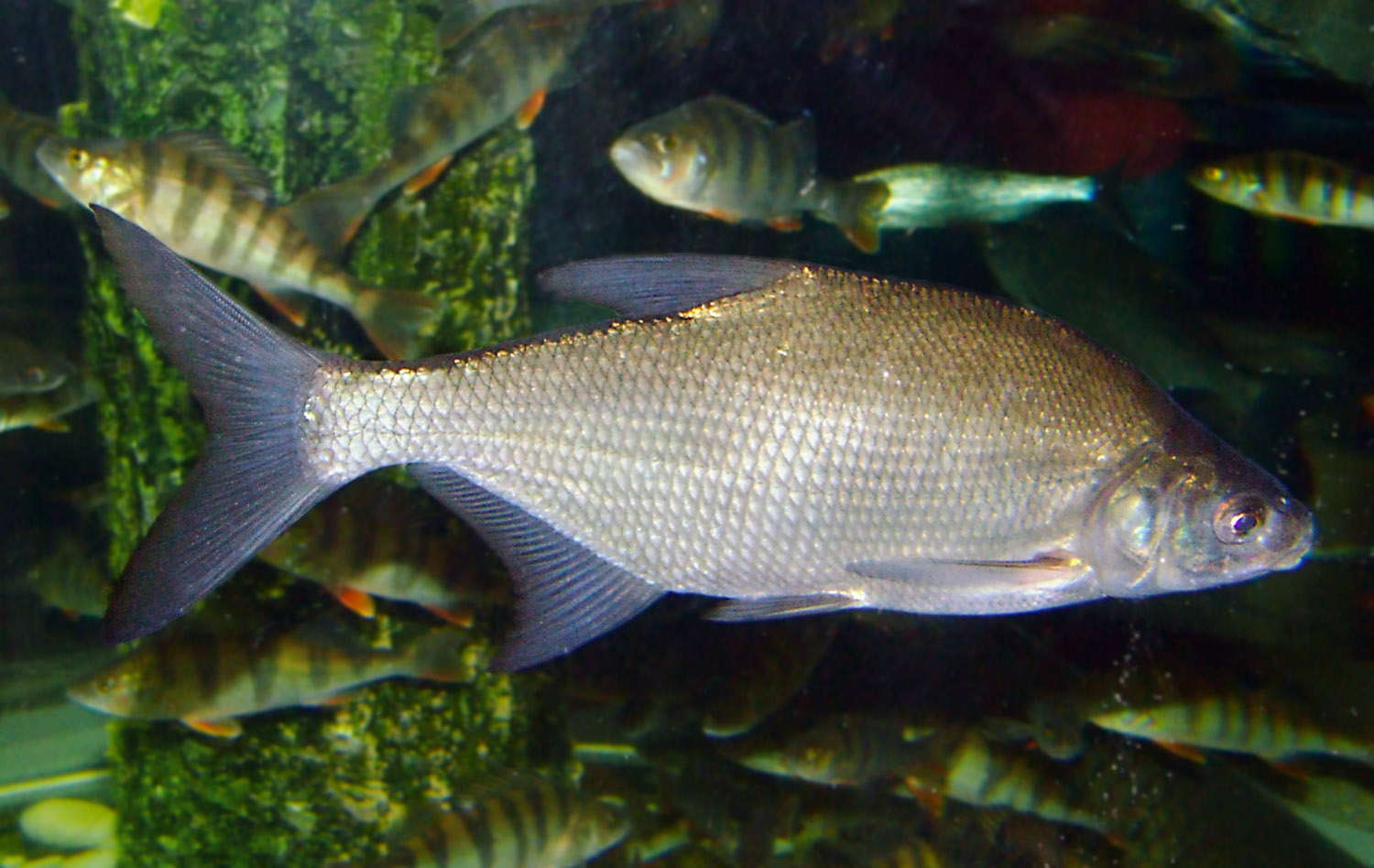

Conservation status
- Least Concern (IUCN 3.1)

Scientific classification
- Kingdom: Animalia
- Phylum: Chordata
- Class: Actinopterygii
- Division: Teleostei
- Order: Cypriniformes
- Family: Leuciscidae
- Subfamily: Leuciscinae
- Genus: Abramis; Cuvier, 1816
- Species: A. brama

Binomial name
- Abramis brama (Linnaeus, 1758)

Synonyms
- Genus List: Brama Bleeker, 1863; Zopa Fitzinger, 1873; Sapa Kazanskii, 1928; Species List: Cyprinus brama Linnaeus, 1758; Abramis melaenus Agassiz, 1835; Abramis vetula Heckel, 1836; Abramis media Koch, 1840; Abramis argyreus Valenciennes, 1844; Abramis microlepidotus Valenciennes, 1844; Abramis vulgaris Mauduyt, 1849; Abramis gehini Blanchard, 1866; Abramis brama var. sinegorensis Lukasch, 1933; Abramis brama bergi Grib & Vernidub, 1935; Abramis brama danubii Pavlov, 1956

= Common bream =

Species of fish

The common bream (Abramis brama), also known as the freshwater bream, bream, bronze bream, carp bream or sweaty bream, is a European species of freshwater fish in the family Leuciscidae. It is now considered to be the only species in the genus Abramis.

== Taxonomy ==
The common bream was first formally described as Cyprinus brama in the 10th edition of Systema Naturae published in 1758 by Carl Linnaeus with its type locality given as European lakes. In 1816 Georges Cuvier proposed the genus Abramis, designating Cyprinus brama as its type species. This taxon is classified within the subfamily Leuciscinae of the family Leuciscidae.

== Etymology ==
The common bream is the only species in the genus Abramis, this name is an Ancient Greek name for a bream or mullet. The specific name is derived from Abramis.

== Range and habitat ==
The common bream's home range is Europe north of the Alps and Pyrenees, as well as the Balkans. They are found as far east as the Caspian Sea, the Black Sea, and the Aral Sea. The common bream lives in ponds, lakes, canals, and slow-flowing rivers.

The common bream generally lives in rivers (especially in the lower reaches) and in nutrient-rich lakes and ponds with muddy bottoms and plenty of algae. It can also be found in brackish sea waters.

== Description ==
The bream is usually 30 to 55 cm (12 to 22 in) long, though some specimens of 75 cm (30 in) have been recorded; it usually weighs 2 to 4 kg (4.4 to 8.8 lb). Its maximum length is 90 cm (35 in), the record weight exceeds 9 kg (20 lb).

The common bream has a laterally flattened and high-backed body and a slightly undershot mouth. It has a bright silver colouration, though older fish can be bronze-coloured, especially in clear waters. The fins are greyish to black, but never reddish.

=== Similar-looking fish ===
The common bream can easily be confused with the silver or white bream (Blicca bjoerkna), in particular at the younger stages (see picture). The most reliable method of distinguishing these species is by counting the scales in a straight line downwards from the first ray of the dorsal fin to the lateral line. Silver bream have fewer than 10 rows of scales, while common bream have 11 or more. At the adult stage the reddish tint of the fin of the silver bream is diagnostic. Like other Cyprinidae, common bream can easily hybridise with other species, and hybrids with roach (Rutilus rutilus) can be very difficult to distinguish from pure-bred bream.

Immature specimens could also be confused with other European breams, such as the two Ballerus species or Vimba vimba.

Silver bream (Blicca bjoerkna) and common bream (Abramis brama) comparison

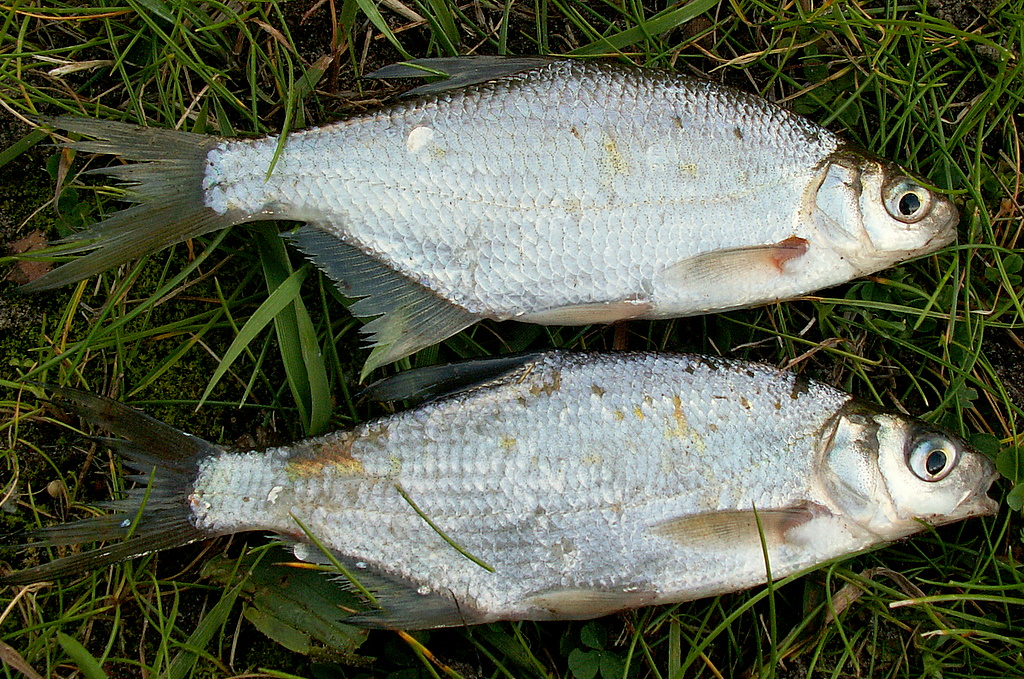
B. bjoerkna (top), immature A. brama (bottom)

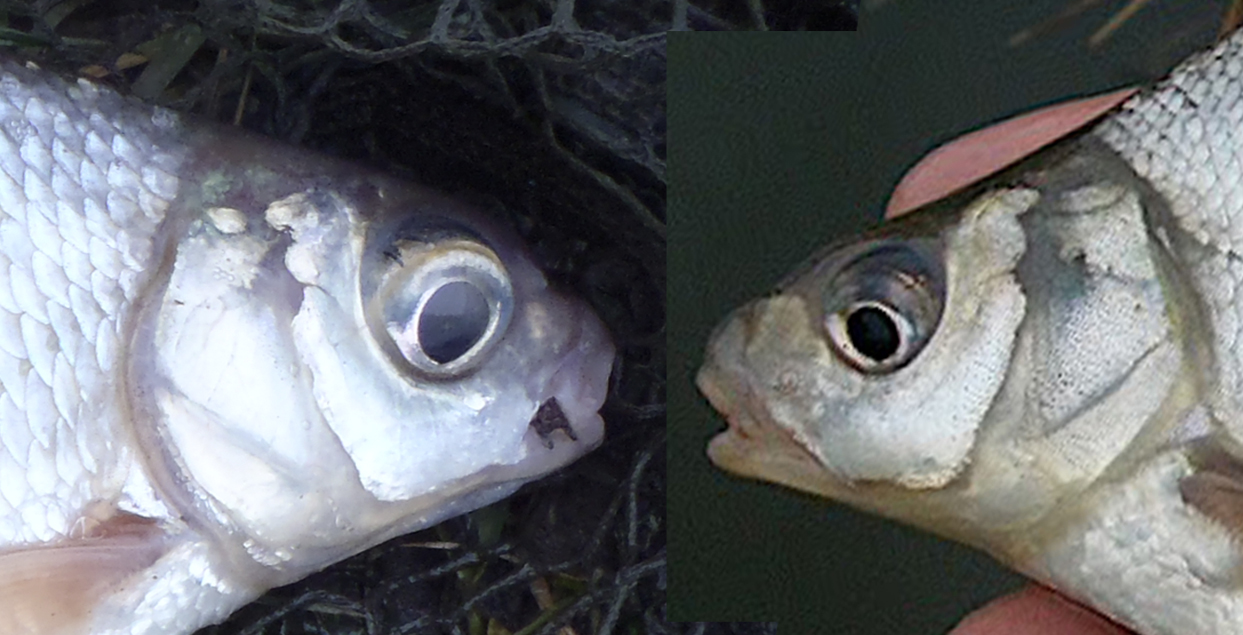
B. bjoerkna (left), immature A. bramis (right).

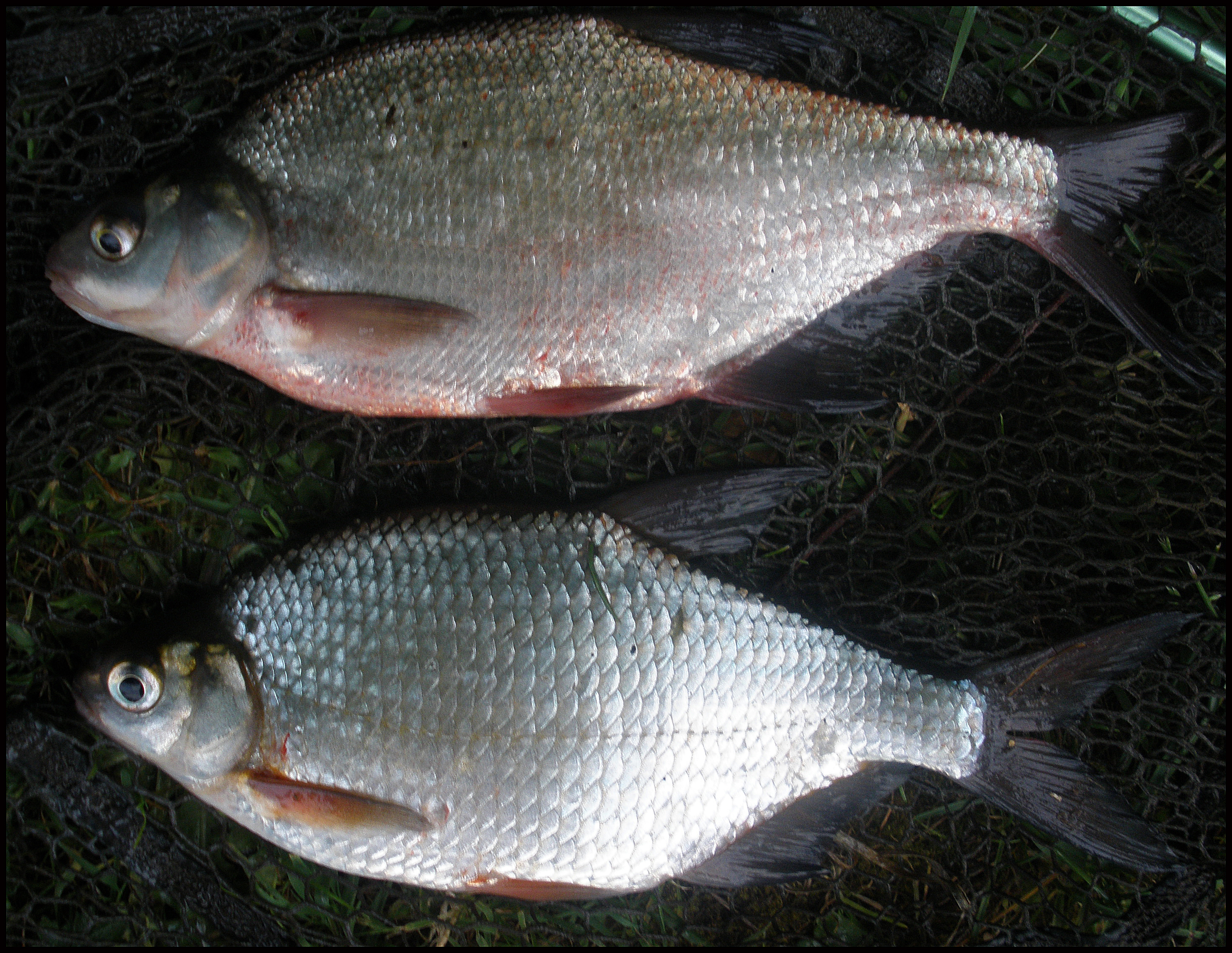
Immature A. brama (top). Mature B. bjoerkna (bottom)

== Biology ==
=== Feeding habits ===
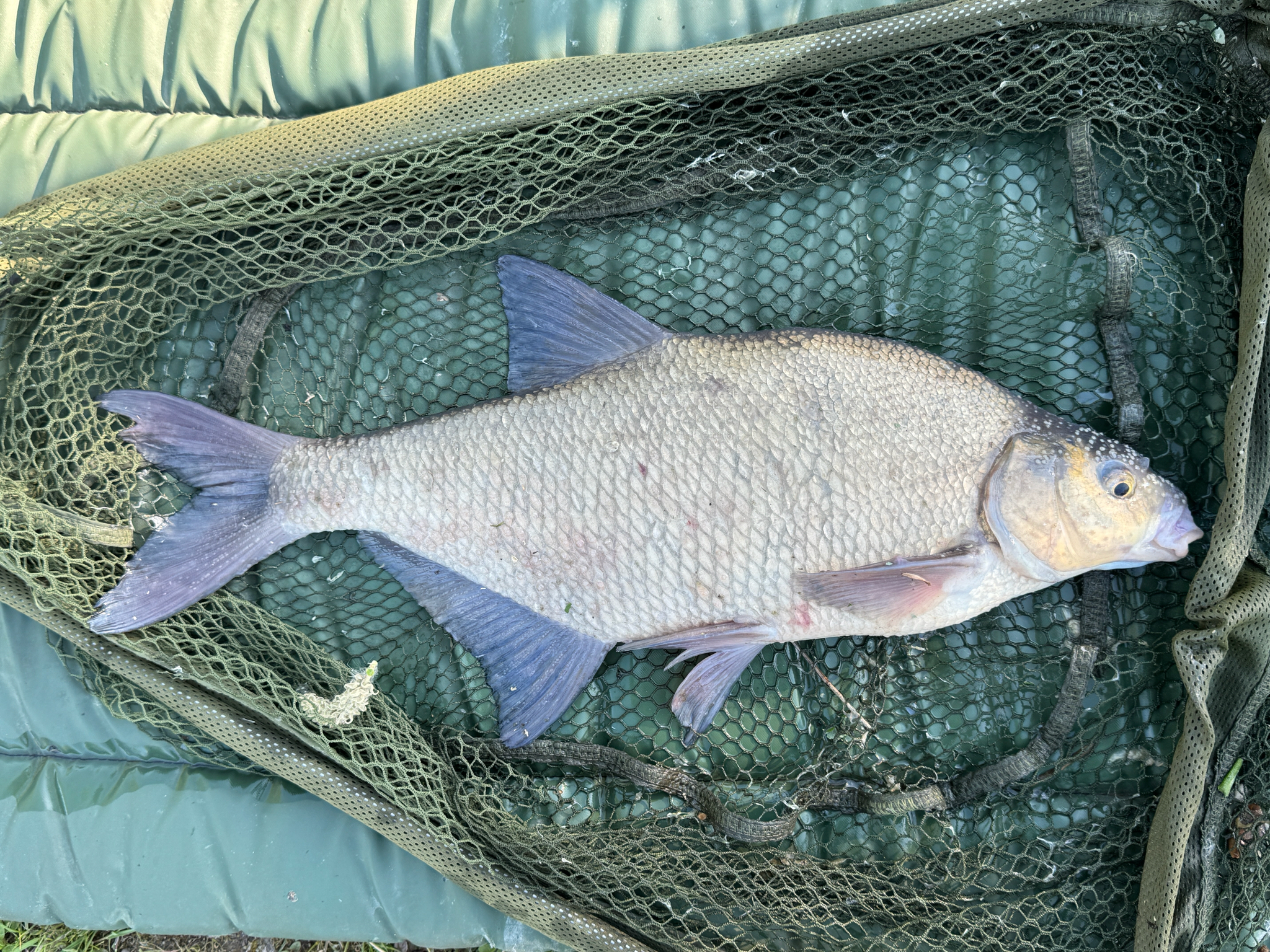
In England, with visible tubercles

The common bream lives in schools near the bottom. At night, common bream can feed close to the shore, and in clear waters with sandy bottoms, feeding pits can be seen during daytime. The fish's protractile mouth helps it dig for chironomid larvae, Tubifex worms, bivalves, and gastropods. The bream eats water plants and plankton, as well.

In very turbid waters, common bream can occur in large numbers, which may result in a shortage of bottom-living prey such as chironomids. The bream are then forced to live by filter feeding with their gill rakers, Daphnia water fleas being the main prey. As the fish grows, the gill rakers become too far apart to catch small prey and the bream will not then grow bigger than 40 cm (16 in). If a common bream is malnourished, it can develop a so-called "knife back", a sharp edge along its back.

=== Spawning ===
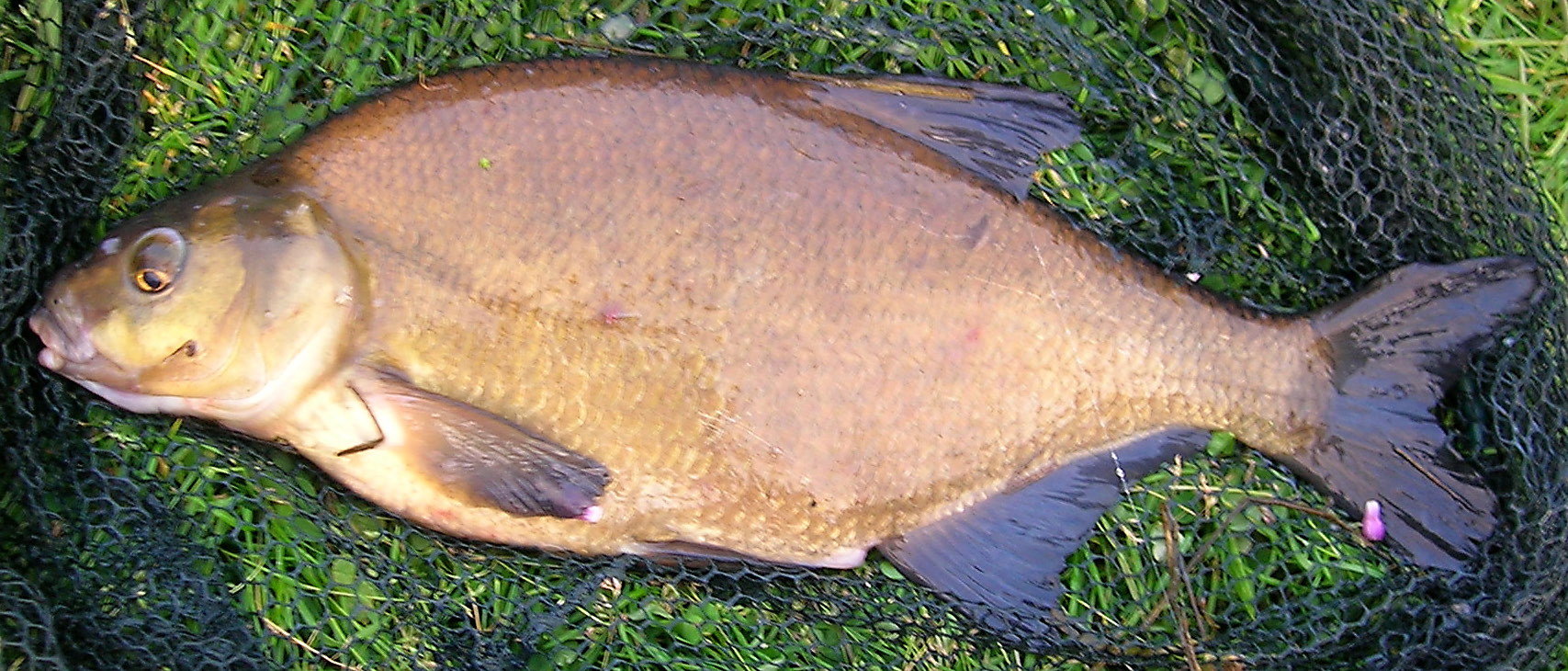
A mature bronze-coloured common bream from the Netherlands

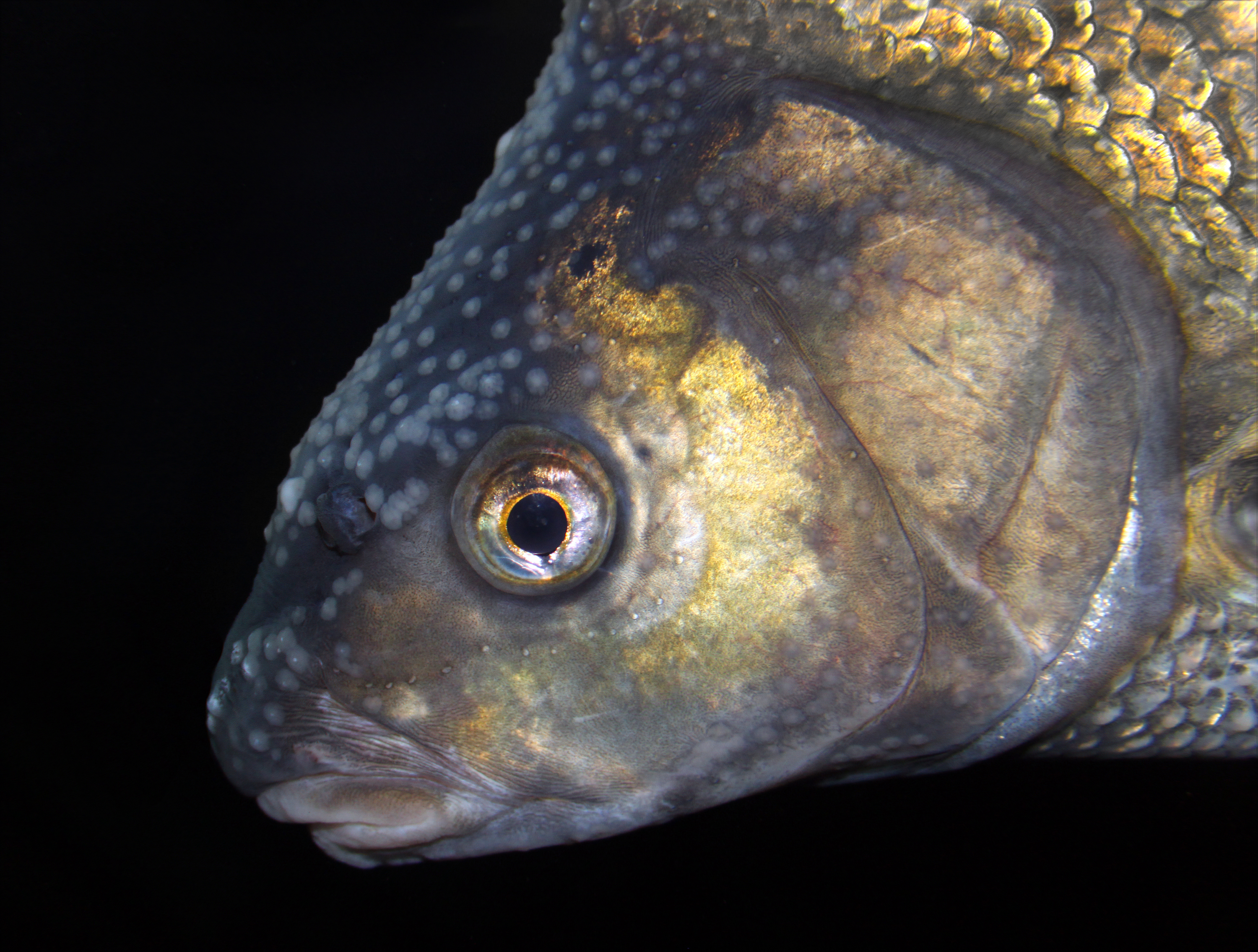
Close up, showing tubercles

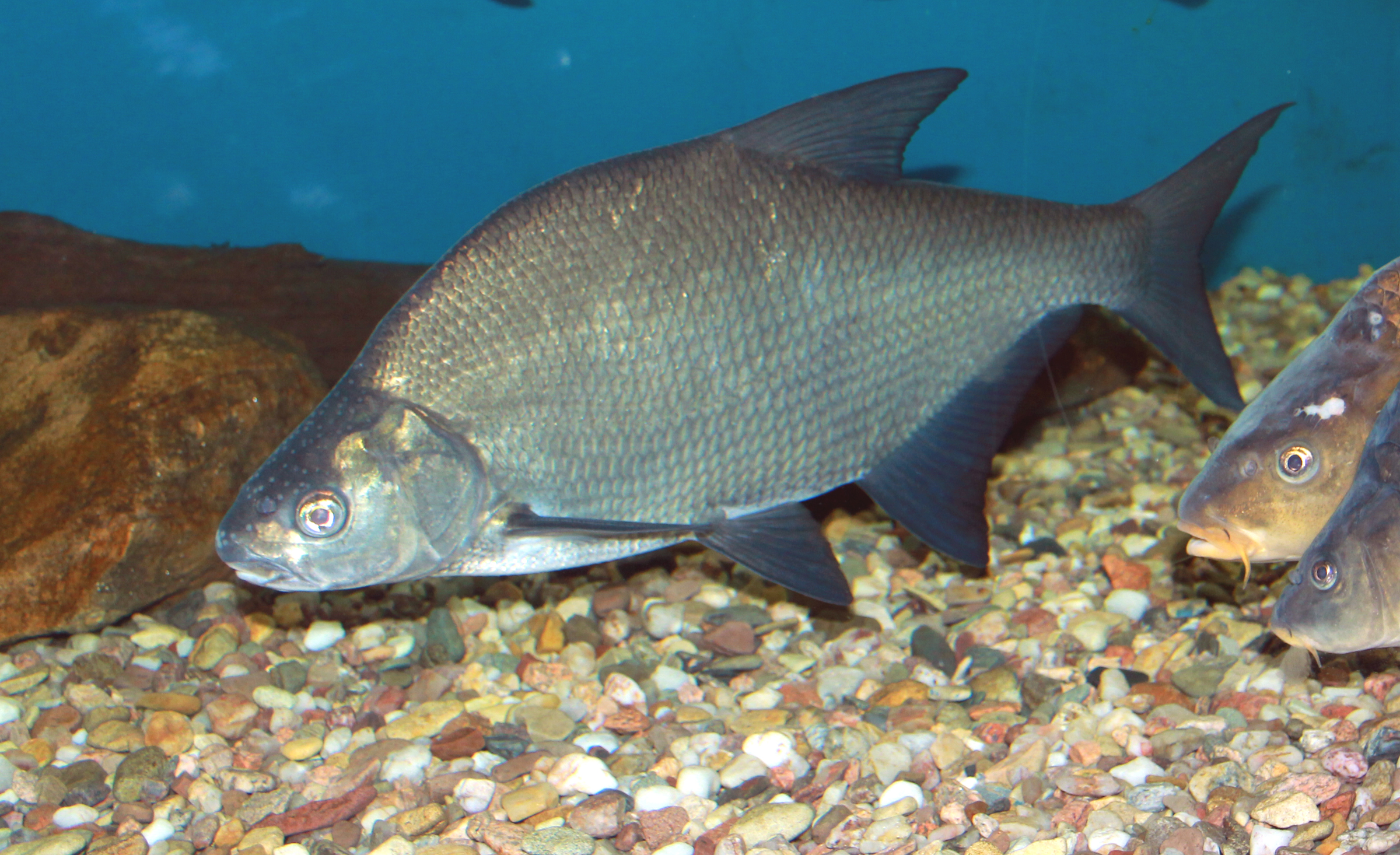
Common bream on exhibition in Prague

The common bream spawns from April to June, when water temperatures are around 12–20 °C (54–68 °F). At this time, the males develop white tubercles on head and upper body and form territories which they defend. The females lay 90,000 to 300,000 eggs per kilogram of body weight over large areas of weed or within reed beds over 7 to 14 days. The eggs are then fertilised by the male. The fry hatch after 3 to 12 days and attach themselves to water plants with special adhesive glands, until their yolk is used up. The fry will stay in the warmer water around the weed beds and margins initially and then form large shoals, gradually moving into deeper water. The fry feed on zooplankton during the day initially, growing quickly during the warmer months and then becoming bottom feeders that filter the substrate for invertebrates and molluscs.

Because of their high fertility and adaptability, breams are known to overpopulate. This causes the fish to grow at a slow pace and become stunted.

Because of their slender shape, the young fish are often not recognised as bream, but they can be identified by their flat bodies and silvery colour. At this stage, the fish are still pelagic, but after a few months, they acquire their typical body shape and become bottom-dwellers. By three to four years old, the fish are sexually mature.

== Fishing ==
The freshwater bream is not generally caught for consumption. Common bream are popular with sport and match fishermen. However, bream are not as hard fighting as most other fish native to the UK, as due to their flat, disc-shaped profile they are relatively easy to bring to the bank. Bream will eat most baits, especially:

- Sweetcorn – two or three grains hooked or hair-rigged.
- Maggots/worms – two or three straight on the hook.
- Boilies – the large mouths of Bream will devour most boilies

Bream can be caught in rivers or lakes, with generous use of groundbait to attract the shoals. They are not shy fish. Another technique is float fishing on the bottom. Ledgering (using just a lead weight to hold the bait down) with a cage feeder full of bait often works better on larger rivers and lakes.

As of 2022 the current European record common bream caught with rod and reel is 10.32 kilograms (22.8 lb), caught in the United Kingdom.

== See also ==
- Bream (disambiguation)
