= Moshe Dluznowsky =

Polish Jewish journalist and writer

Moshe Dluznowsky (Dunow) (Polish: Mojżesz "Moszek" Dłużnowski, Yiddish: משה דלושנאָװסקי, 1903–1977), was a Polish-born journalist, publicist, writer, dramatist, and editor of the journal Tomashover Vokhenblat.

== Origin and family ==
Born on 22 February (or 9 February according to the Russian [Julianic] calendar) 1903 at 7 a.m. in Tomaszow Rawski (now Tomaszow Mazowiecki in Poland; then in Russian Empire). He originated from an unpropertied Jewish family. His father Mordka Henokh Dłużnowski (1870–1934) was a small shopkeeper in Tomaszów, who with his wife Estera née Piyus (1870-1942?) created also Yuda Beyer vel Bernard (1894-1942?), a Tomaszowian weaver, Abram (1896–1942), Yuda (born in 1899), Noach and the youngest daughter Sara (born in 1905).

Moshe Dluznowsky (Dunow) married Berta Klebanow in July 1947 in New York City. Berta was born in Minsk, emigrated to the United States at an early age. She was involved in Yiddish cultural activities and was a teacher. Moshe's daughter, Esti Dunow (born in 1948) is a painter and art historian, expert on the work of the painter Chaïm Soutine, co-author of the Chaïm Soutine Catalogue Raisonne. Moshe's son Henry Dunow (born in 1953) is a literary agent and co-owner (from 1997) "Dunow, Carlson and Lerner Literary Agency". He wrote a memory on his father and family (see The Way Home: Scenes from a Season, Lessons from a Lifetime, New York 2001).

== Education and journalistic work ==
Moshe was educated in his native Tomaszow. He finished Itzhak Milter's primary Jewish school (cheder), which was a hot-bed for many writers and journalists who wrote their literary works in Yiddish. From 1925 to 1930 he was an editor of the local journal "Tomaszower Wokhenblat", published in Yiddish. He was also a member of the Zionist party "Poale Zion". In 1930 he left his familiar town and emigrated to France. He settled down in Paris, where his elder brother Abram resided (Abram was arrested in Paris after the Nazi conquest of France and finally was sent to the concentration camp Auschwitz; he was murdered there on 25 April 1942). In Paris Dluznowsky was a correspondent of a number of Jewish journals, e.g. "Parizer Wokhenblat". Before the Nazi conquest of France he left for Morocco and in 1942 moved to the United States.

== Life and works in U.S.A. ==
There he settled in New York. Moshe Dluznowsky composed numerous novels, essays and theatrical works written in Yiddish. He belonged to the American association of the Jewish writers (Yiddish PEN Club). Moshe Dluznowsky's novels, essays, and art criticism appeared regularly in the New York Yiddish newspaper, The Forward, as well as in periodicals and journals in Paris, Buenos Aires, Mexico City, and Israel. He maintained contacts with other Jewish writers from Poland, such as Isaac Bashevis Singer. In his book Dos Rod fun Mazl ("Fortune's wheel", New York 1949, pp. 419), written in Yiddish, Moshe Dluznowsky shared interesting recollections of his family's town Tomaszów. He was awarded the Zvi Kessel Literary Prize in 1949.

He published a number of other books in Yiddish:

- A brunem baym veg ("A well near the road", Buenos Aires 1953, pp. 254)
- Harbst in vayngortn: dertseylungen un drames ("Autumn in the vineyard: novella and dramas", Buenos Aires 1956, pp. 321)
- 'Der Rayvogn (Buenos Aires 1958)
- Vi a Boim in feld ("Like a tree in a field", Buenos Aires 1958, pp. 492)
- Vintmiln ("Windmills", Buenos Aires 1963, pp. 560)
- Tirn un fenster ("Doors and windows", Buenos Aires 1966, pp. 228)

Some of his works (e.g. Dem Tepers Tejter) were published in Spanish (Las Hijas del Alfarero, Buenos Aires 1959, translated by Arie Zafrán y Susana R. de Zafrán, pp. 503) and in English (The Potter's Daughter, London 1959). The most known Dluznowsky's drama Der ajnzame szif ("The Lonesome Ship") was successfully produced in New York, Los Angeles (by Maurice Schwartz) and in Ida Kaminska's Jewish Theater in Warsaw (Polish first performance: June 17, 1961).

He died on July 30, 1977, in New York.

== Selected bibliography ==
- A. Cygielman, Tomaszow Mazowiecki, in: Encyclopaedia Judaica, vol. 15, Jerusalem 1982, p. 1215 (Moshe Dolzenowsky);
- Henry Dunow, The Way Home: Scenes from a Season, Lessons from a Lifetime, New York 2001, pp. 65–84, 188–193, 229–230;
- Beate Kosmala, Juden und Deutsche im polnischen Haus. Tomaszów Mazowiecki 1914-1939, Berlin 2001, pp. 47, 99-101 (in German);
- B. Katz, Moyshe Dluznovski, "Mendele: Yiddish Literature and Yiddish Language", vol. 7, No. 164, 6 III 1998;
- J. Leftwich (ed.), An Anthology of Modern Yiddish Literature, The Hague – Paris 1974, pp. 329–330 (biographical note);
- F. Mohrer, M. Web (eds.), Guide to the YIVO Archives, New York 1997, p. 68;
- N. Sandrow, Vagabond Stars: A World History of Yiddish Theater, Syracuse 1996, pp. VI, 256, 406, 431, 436 (Moyshe Dluzhnovsky);
- Krzysztof Tomasz Witczak, Słownik biograficzny Żydów tomaszowskich Biographical Dictionary of Jews from Tomaszów Mazowiecki, Łódź - Tomaszów Mazowiecki 2010, Wydawnictwo Uniwersytetu Łódzkiego, ISBN 978-83-7525-358-0, s. 78-79 (phot., biographical note in Polish s.v. Dłużnowski Moszek).
