= Mirosława Jastrzębska =

Mirosława Jastrzębska, née Kwiatkowska (21 March 1921 in Gąbin, Poland – 24 October 1982) was a Polish scientist, ethnographer, and museum curator.

She graduated from the Maria Curie-Skłodowska University in ethnography and ethnology and in 1951 under the guidance of Józef Gajek she defended her Masters thesis Folk architecture in the village of Smolanka, poviat Łuków (Budownictwo ludowe we wsi Smolanka, pow. Łuków). After that, she worked at various museums. As a researcher, she was mainly interested in annual and family folk rituals and folk art. She was an active member of the Polish Ethnological Society: she popularized folk art and other subjects of her expertise by organizing fairs, competitions, exhibitions and lectures.

She was curator of the Regional Museum in Tomaszów Mazowiecki.

In 1950 she married Józef Jastrzębski, also an ethnographer.

== Awards and decorations ==
- She was decorated with Gold Cross of Merit. She also received regional distinctions and awards including the Award of the Voivode of Łódź in 1973.
