= Tomaszów Mazowiecki =

City in Poland

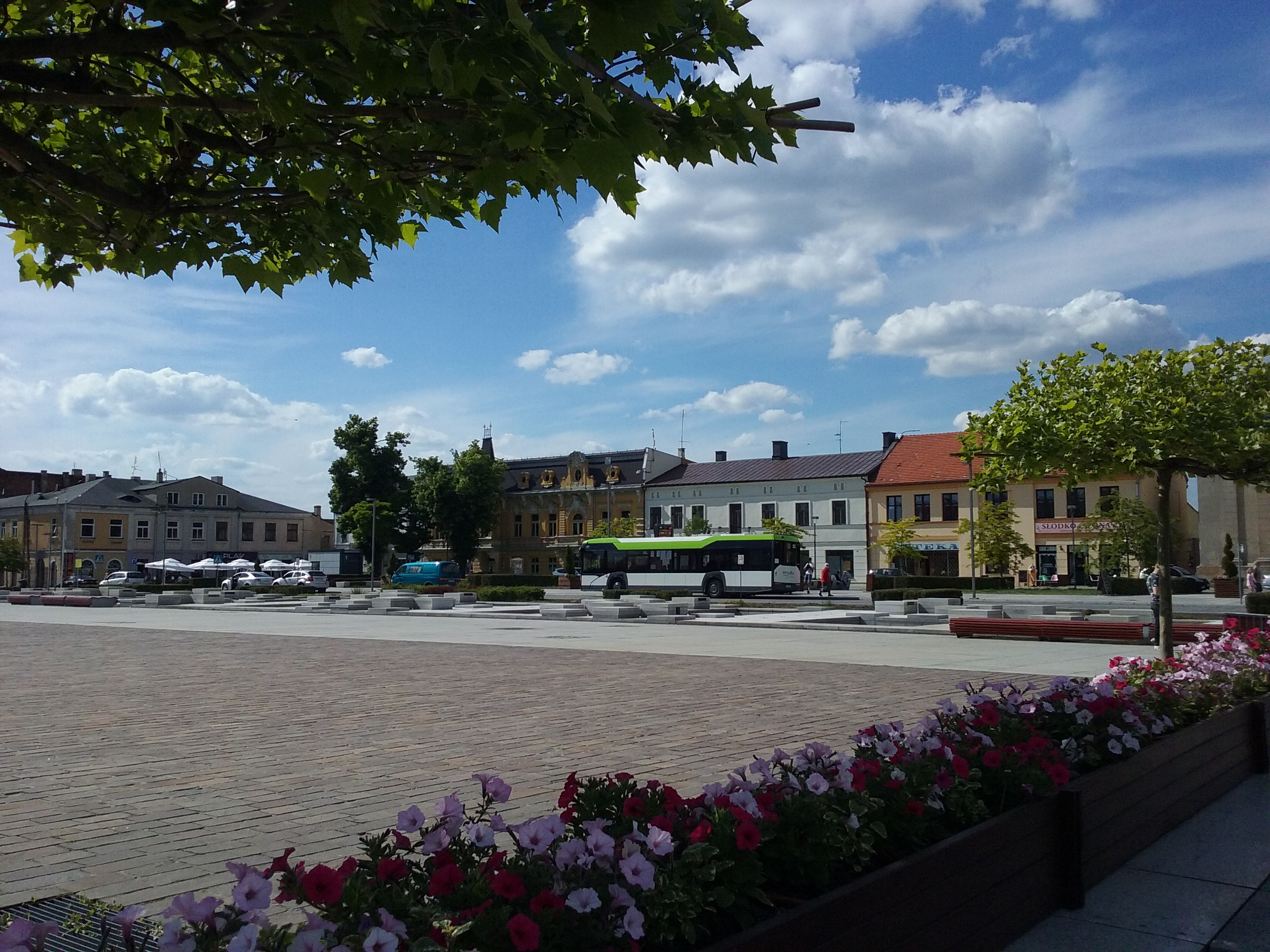
- Kościuszko Square in Tomaszów Mazowiecki

- Flag Coat of arms

- Location within Poland Location within Łódź Voivodeship
- Coordinates: 51°31′N 20°1′E
- Country: Poland
- Voivodeship: Łódź
- County: Tomaszów County
- Gmina: Tomaszów Mazowiecki (urban gmina)
- Established: 18th century
- City rights: 1830

Government
  - City mayor: Marcin Witko (PiS)

Area
  - Total: 41.3 km^{2} (15.9 sq mi)

Population (31 December 2021)
  - Total: 60,529 ▼
  - Density: 1,470/km^{2} (3,800/sq mi)
- Time zone: UTC+1 (CET)
  - Summer (DST): UTC+2 (CEST)
- Postal code: 97-200
- Area code: +48 44
- Car plates: ETM
- Climate: Dfb
- Website: http://www.tomaszow-maz.eu

Tomaszów Mazowiecki (pronounced [tɔˈmaʂuf mazɔˈvjɛt͡skʲi], Yiddish: טאָמעשעוו or Tomashuv) is a town in central Poland with 60,529 inhabitants (2021). It is the fourth most populous city in the Łódź Voivodeship and the second with free public transport. It is the seat of Tomaszów County.

In Tomaszów Mazowiecki there is the first (and the only) all-year speed skating track in Poland - Ice Arena Tomaszów Mazowiecki, which has hosted the World Championships. In autumn, the city hosts the international Love Polish Jazz festival, organized by the Polish Ministry of Culture and National Heritage.

== Location ==
Trumpet Call of Tomaszów

Tomaszów is situated in the Łódź Voivodeship (since 1999); previously, it was part of Piotrków Voivodeship (1975–1998). Tomaszów occupies an area of 41.3 square kilometres (15.9 sq mi) as of 2002. The town is situated on the banks of three rivers, the Pilica, Wolbórka, and Czarna Bielina, and is near the Sulejow Reservoir and the edge of the Puszcza Spalska wilderness area.

== History ==
Historical affiliations

Polish–Lithuanian Commonwealth 1788–1793
Kingdom of Prussia 1793–1807
Duchy of Warsaw 1807–1815
Kingdom of Poland 1815–1832
Russian Empire 1832–1915
Government General of Warsaw 1915–1918
Kingdom of Poland 1917–1918
Second Polish Republic 1918–1939
General Government 1939–1945
Polish People's Republic 1945–1989
Third Polish Republic 1989–present

Tomaszów Mazowiecki was founded in 1788 by Count Tomasz Adam Ostrowski when iron ore was discovered there. Ostrowski invited the first miners and metallurgists from the Old-Polish Industrial Region. The settlement fell into the Prussian Partition in 1793 during the Second Partition of Poland. In 1807 it was regained by Poles and included within the short-lived Duchy of Warsaw, and since 1815 it was located in the Russian Partition. The metal industry was expanded around 1820. Tomaszów received city rights in 1830 during the Polish November Uprising against the Russian Empire. The first weavers came to Tomaszów from Zgorzelec. The first Lutheran church was established in 1823. In 1825, Antoni Ostrowski transferred from the village of Tobiasze to Tomaszów a Catholic parish with the church of St. Wenceslas – Duke of Bohemia, which was located at Wieczność St., in the area of the first Catholic cemetery (nowadays Słowackiego St). In 1831 Qahal was founded. During the January Uprising, on July 12 and September 1, 1863, clashes between Polish insurgents and Russian soldiers took place. From 1867, it was administratively located in the Piotrków Governorate.

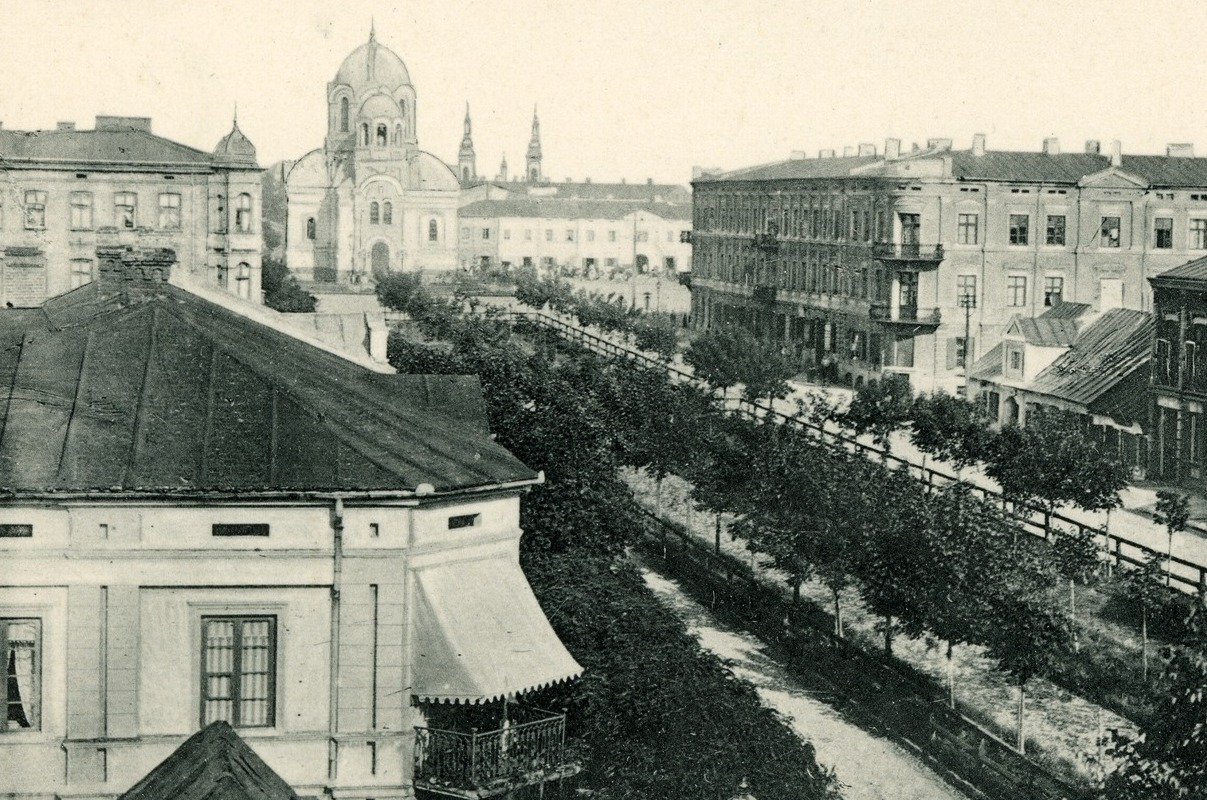
Early 20th-century view of the town. Kaliska Street, now Piłsudskiego Avenue. In the background of the photo, the Orthodox Church of St. Nicholas the Wonderworker, existing on the main square of Tomaszów since 1901 to 1925.

During World War I, Tomaszów was occupied by Germany, which policies led to poverty and hunger among the population. During the war, local Poles organized secret resistance in the town, including the Polish Military Organisation. After the war, on November 11, 1918, Poland regained independence, and the Poles disarmed German troops, who afterwards left the town. In mid-November 1918, the town's first Polish military unit was organized. Within interwar Poland, the Polish Army was stationed in the town, and it administratively belonged to the Łódź Voivodeship. By 1931 the Jewish population of the city grew to 11,310 inhabitants, or about 30% of the general population of Tomaszów.

=== World War II ===
On 1 September 1939, the first day of the German-Soviet invasion of Poland that started World War II, the Germans air raided the town twice, killing seven people. Further air raids were carried out in the following days, forcing many inhabitants to flee. The Germans bombed houses, factories and fire engines. On 6 September, the Battle of Tomaszów Mazowiecki was fought between Poland and Germany. On 7 September, the Germans entered the town and the Einsatzgruppe III arrived to commit various atrocities against the populace. The Germans then looted the town, burned houses, and committed some murders of its inhabitants. On 26 September, the Germans founded a local branch of the Arbeitsamt, which sent local Poles to forced labour. The Great Synagogue was burned to the ground as first on 16 October 1939; the remaining two synagogues were destroyed on 7–14 November.

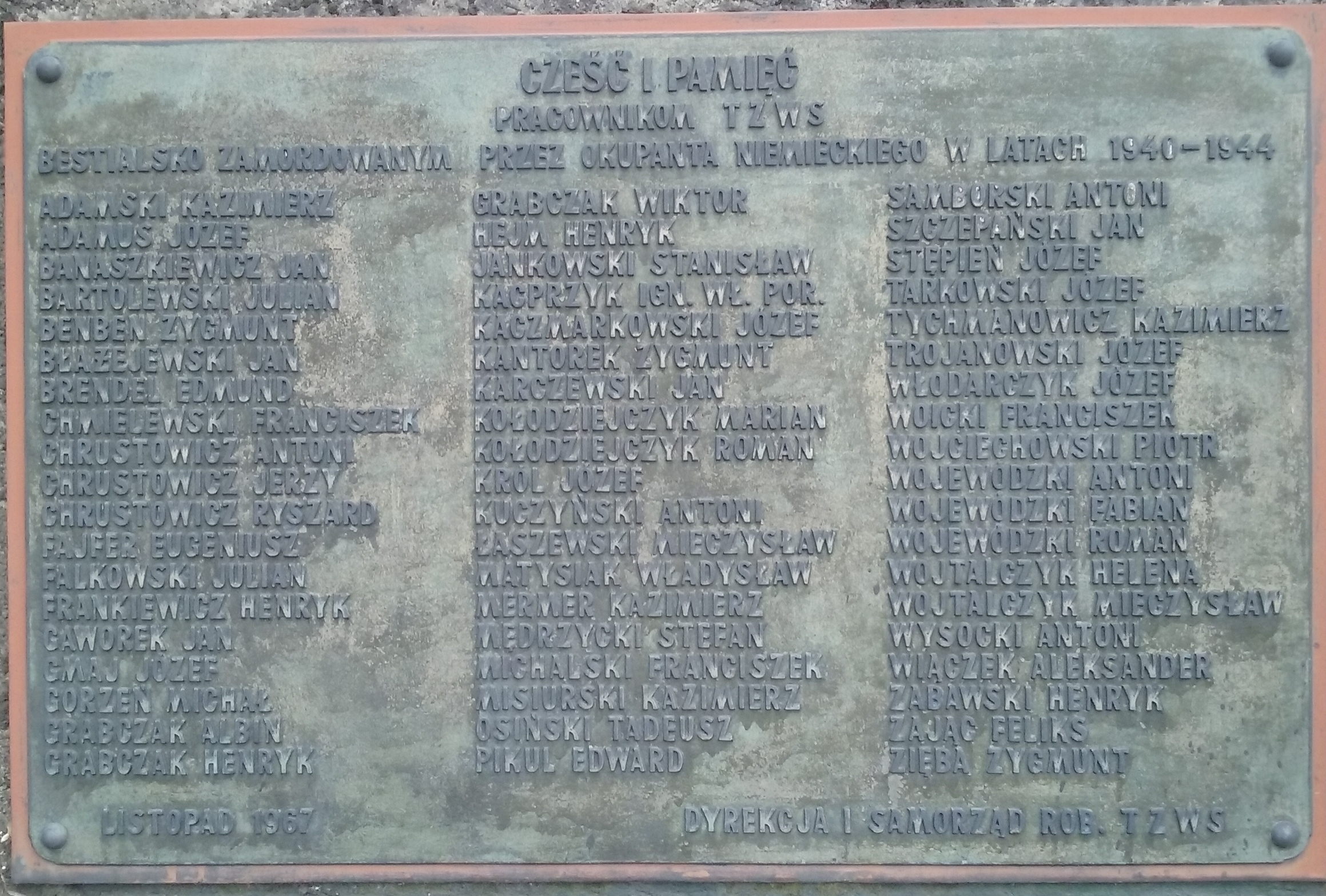
Memorial plaque to local synthetic fiber factory workers murdered by the Germans in 1940–1944

Before the Polish Independence Day (11 November), in 1939, the German police carried out mass arrests of about 300 Poles, including priests, teachers, doctors, judges, workers and activists. Most were released after November 11, but some, including the pre-war mayor, were imprisoned in Piotrków Trybunalski. Further mass arrests of Poles were carried out in January, June and August 1940. On 12–13 June, the Germans arrested 280 people, while on 12–13 August they arrested many women. The victims were then interrogated by the Gestapo, and most were afterwards deported to the Sachsenhausen, Ravensbrück and Buchenwald concentration camps, while some were murdered on the spot. A ghetto for the imprisonment of 16,500 Polish Jews was created in December 1940 and closed off from the outside in December 1941. Hunger was rampant, followed by the typhus epidemic. In December 1942, 15,000 Jews were deported aboard Holocaust trains to the Treblinka extermination camp. Some 200 Jews from Tomaszów are known to have survived World War II. The Germans carried out further executions of Poles, among which was priest Wojciech Dionizy Bryndza-Nacki, and also established and operated a Nazi prison, and a Baudienst forced labour camp for young Poles in the town. In 1944, even 12-year-old Polish children were used as slave labourers to build fortifications in the area in preparation for the advancing Eastern Front. In 1944, during and following the Warsaw Uprising, the Germans deported thousands of Varsovians from the Dulag 121 camp in Pruszków, where they were initially imprisoned, to Tomaszów Mazowiecki. Those Poles were mainly old people, ill people and women with children. 30,000 Poles expelled from Warsaw stayed in the town and nearby settlements, as of 1 November 1944.

== Geography ==
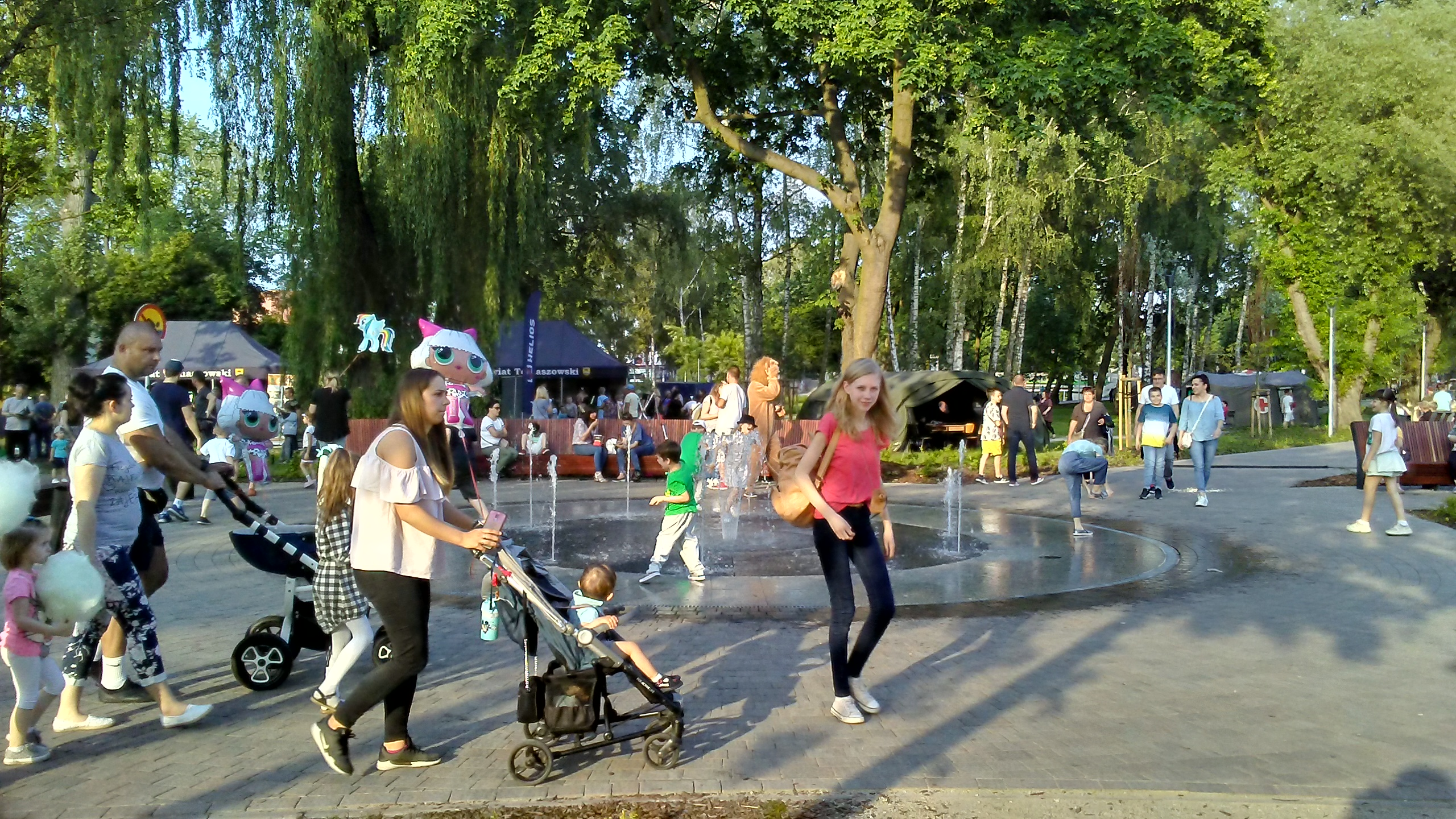
Urban park „Bulwary” in the historical town center on the Wolbórka river south bank

According to 2006 data, Tomaszów has an area of 41.3 square kilometres (15.9 sq mi); about 45 percent of the land is put to agricultural use, 13% is forested, and the city itself covers about 4.03% of the area.

In the valley of the Pilica river in the south-eastern part of the town, there is a unique natural karst spring of water containing calcium salts, that is an object of protection in Niebieskie Źródła Nature Reserve in Sulejów Landscape Park. The origin of the name of the reserve Niebieskie Źródła, which means Blue Springs, comes from the fact that red waves are absorbed by water and only blue and green are reflected from the bottom of the spring, giving that atypical colour. The reserve is situated near the end of Saint Anthony Street (in Polish: ulica świętego Antoniego) that begins in the centre of Tomaszów Mazowiecki, in proximity to the central Kościuszko Square.

=== Climate ===
Tomaszów Mazowiecki has a humid continental climate (Dfb in the Köppen climate classification).

Climate data for Tomaszów Mazowiecki
Month	Jan	Feb	Mar	Apr	May	Jun	Jul	Aug	Sep	Oct	Nov	Dec	Year
Mean daily maximum °C (°F)	0.3 (32.5)	2.1 (35.8)	7.1 (44.8)	13.8 (56.8)	18.7 (65.7)	22.0 (71.6)	24.0 (75.2)	23.7 (74.7)	18.8 (65.8)	12.8 (55.0)	7.3 (45.1)	2.5 (36.5)	12.8 (55.0)
Daily mean °C (°F)	−2.0 (28.4)	−0.9 (30.4)	3.1 (37.6)	9.1 (48.4)	14.2 (57.6)	17.7 (63.9)	19.7 (67.5)	19.3 (66.7)	14.5 (58.1)	9.3 (48.7)	4.7 (40.5)	0.4 (32.7)	9.1 (48.4)
Mean daily minimum °C (°F)	−4.5 (23.9)	−4.0 (24.8)	−1.0 (30.2)	3.8 (38.8)	9.0 (48.2)	12.6 (54.7)	15.0 (59.0)	14.5 (58.1)	10.4 (50.7)	6.0 (42.8)	2.2 (36.0)	−1.8 (28.8)	5.2 (41.3)
Average precipitation mm (inches)	45 (1.8)	41 (1.6)	49 (1.9)	50 (2.0)	73 (2.9)	69 (2.7)	92 (3.6)	64 (2.5)	61 (2.4)	47 (1.9)	45 (1.8)	46 (1.8)	682 (26.9)
Source: https://en.climate-data.org/europe/poland/łodz-voivodeship/tomaszow-mazowiecki-10350/

== Economy ==
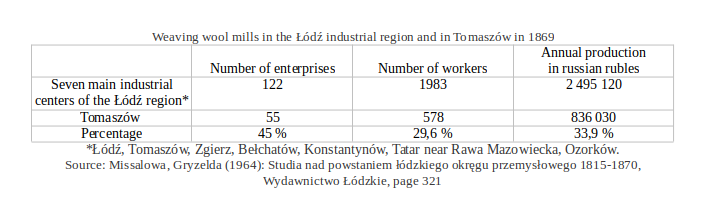
Weaving wool mills in the Łódź industrial region and in Tomaszów (1869)

Since the mid-19th century to the 1990s, a large center of the textile industry. The second, after Łódź, center of clothing wool production in the Congress Poland and nineteenth-century Russia. In the 20th century – thanks to Tomaszów's Artificial Silk Factory – one of the largest European centers for the production of fibers and plastics. Nowadays, Tomaszów Mazowiecki incorporates the Łódź Special Economic Zone, which is one of the 14 special economic zones in Poland. The city is home to a variety of industries: ceramics, construction, chemicals, plastics producers, electrical machinery manufacturers, upholstery, food, logistics and service.

=== Materials industry ===
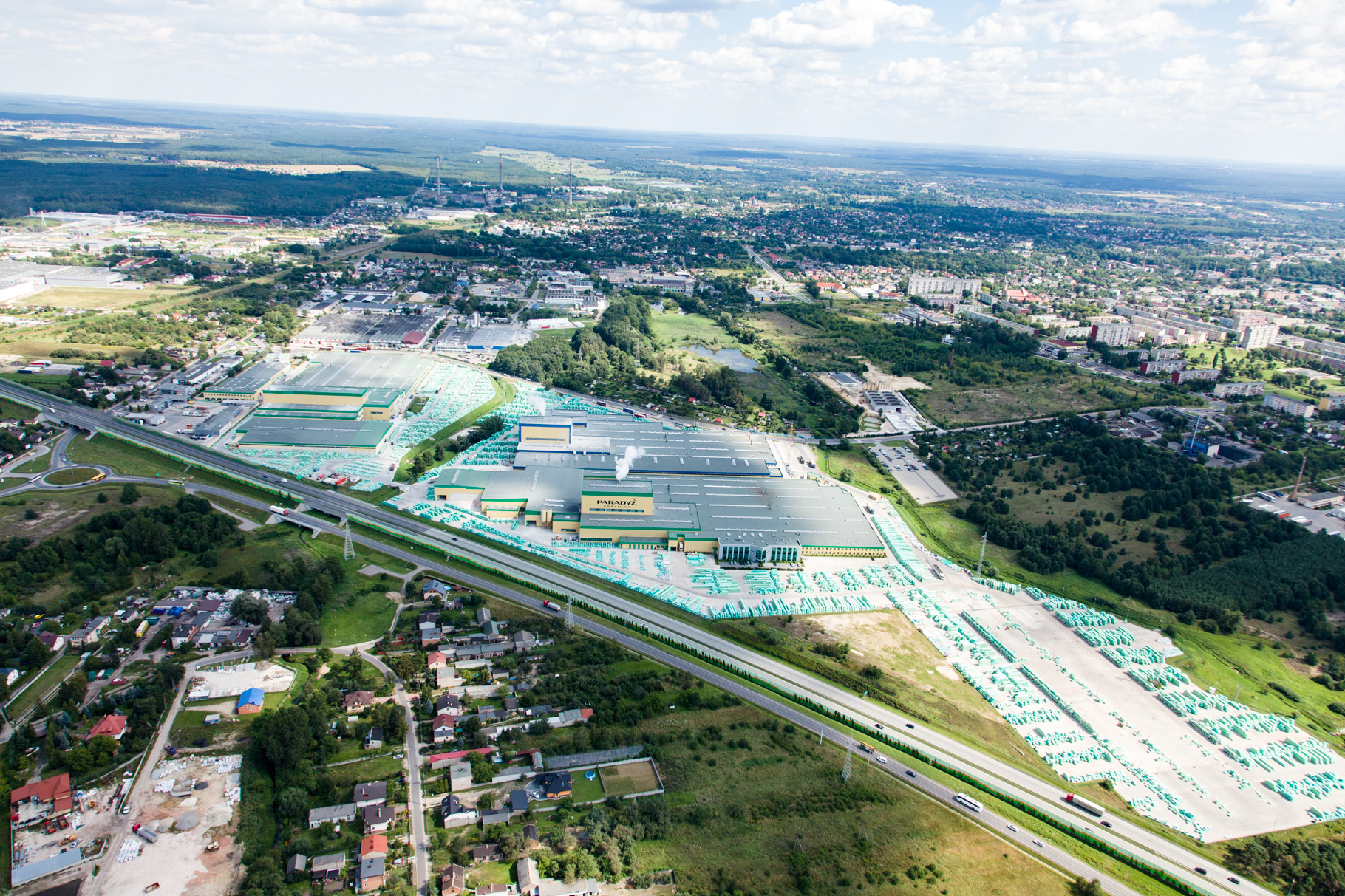
Ceramika Paradyż, factory in Tomaszów Mazowiecki, by Expressway S8

The major minerals companies in the area are Ceramika Paradyż a manufacturer of ceramic tiles and Sacmi which specialises in ceramic tile production machines. The Wagran factory (built on the area of the former Artificial Silk Company of Tomaszów), is a producer of granite sinks

=== Construction sector ===
Within the construction sector Balex Metal produces high quality steel construction components. Ezbud-Budownictwo focuses on the construction of residential and service premises, sales and management of constructed properties and also produces ready-mixed concrete and other building materials. The company has been engaged in the construction of several housing estates in Tomaszów and Łódź from 1989 onwards and since 2019 has been the main sponsor of Tomaszów's largest football club - "Lechia 1923".

=== Chemical industry ===
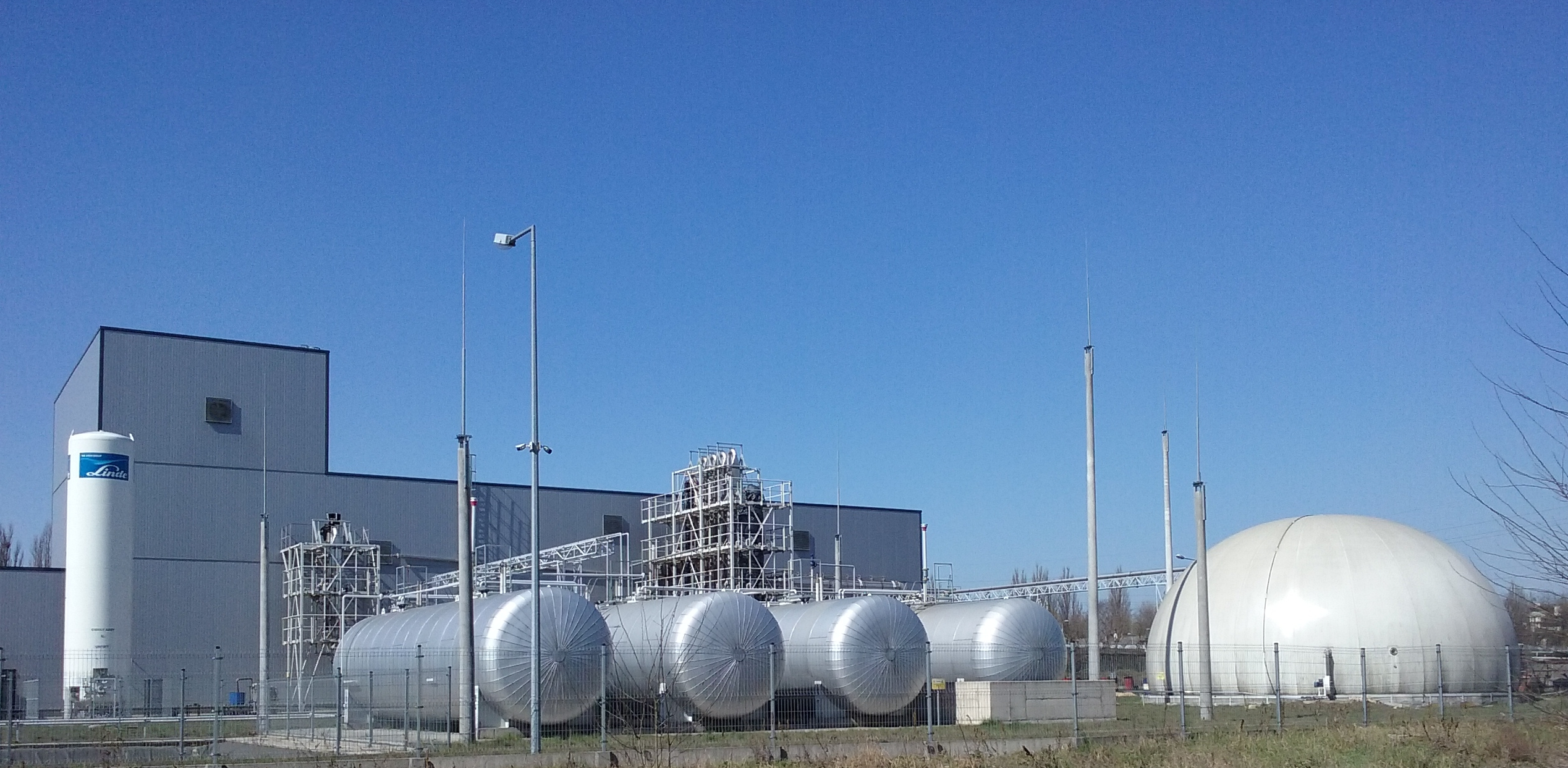
EcoHydroCarbon in Tomaszów

Major chemical companies in Tomaszów include Sicher Bautechnik which is a producer of construction chemicals, EcoHydroCarbon which specializes in polymer waste processing and Toma a plastics processing company that also operates a private clinic at its plant for employees to use.

=== Equipment manufacturers ===
The region has several specialist equipment manufacturers that include Markom, a producer of welding and transport equipment, and Glass Product, which manufactures automatic fertilization and raw material transport systems.

=== Carpets and upholstery industry ===
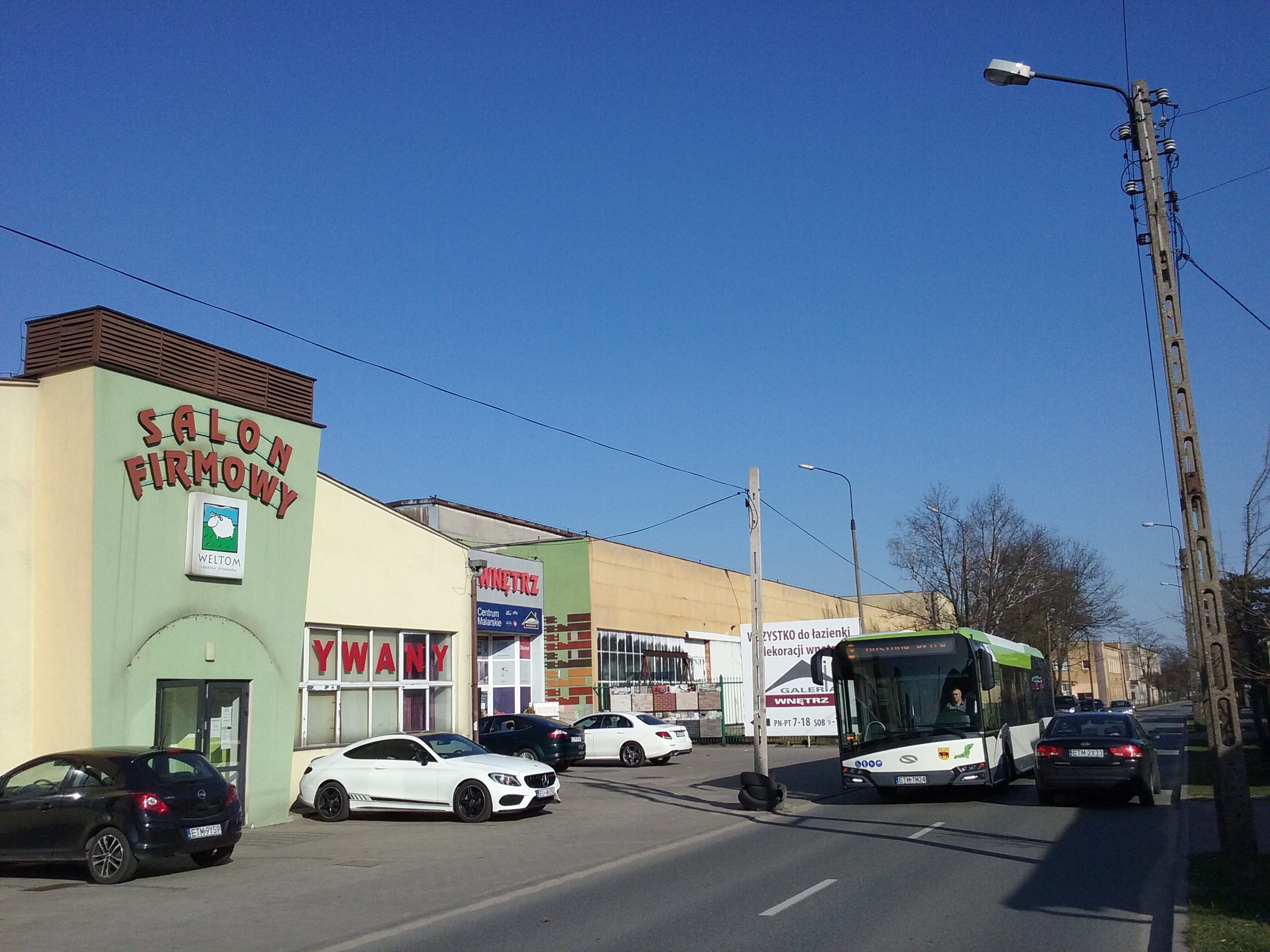
Part of Weltom carpet factory today

The Japanese car manufacturer Toyota has a base in Tomaszów, specializing in the production of upholstery for its range of premium vehicles. Weltom, a producer or carpets and rugs, also has a base in the city. The company was founded by Eleonora and Jan Roland. Their son, Edward Roland, began the business in 1848 from a small workshop consisting of a spinning mill and a weaving mill operated by three people. The workshop was located on Kaliska Street (today Piłsudskiego). In 1905, the company had expanded to employ a hundred and thirty weavers. The company quickly made a name for itself and became known throughout the Russian Empire. After World War II, the company was nationalized and renamed the "Weltom". In the 1990s, the plant underwent a transformation into a joint-stock company. Today, in addition to carpets, the company produces upholstery and coconut wipers. The entire western district of the city (Rolandówka) has been named after the company's founders.

=== Food industry ===
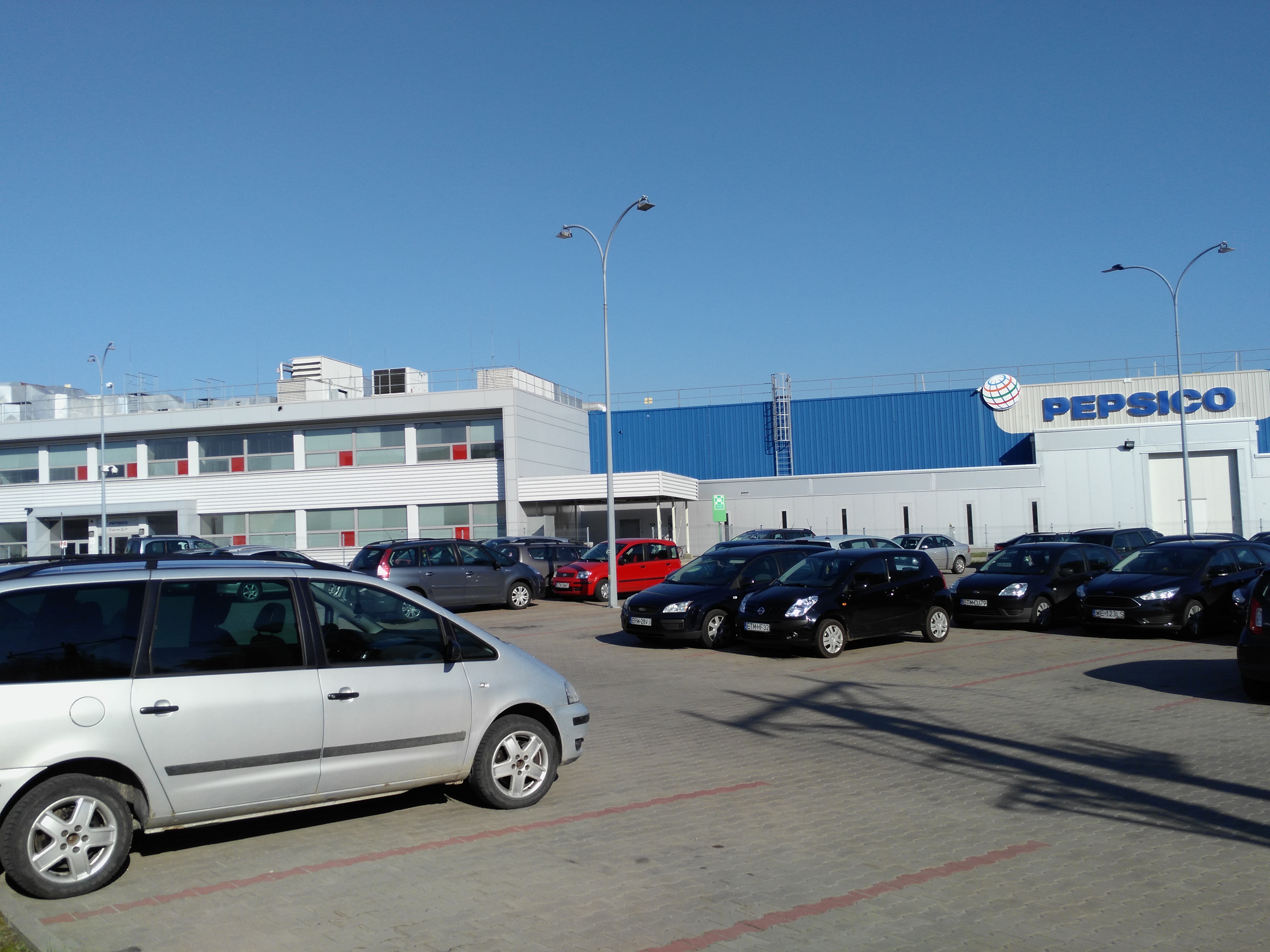
PepsiCo factory in Tomaszowie Mazowieckim

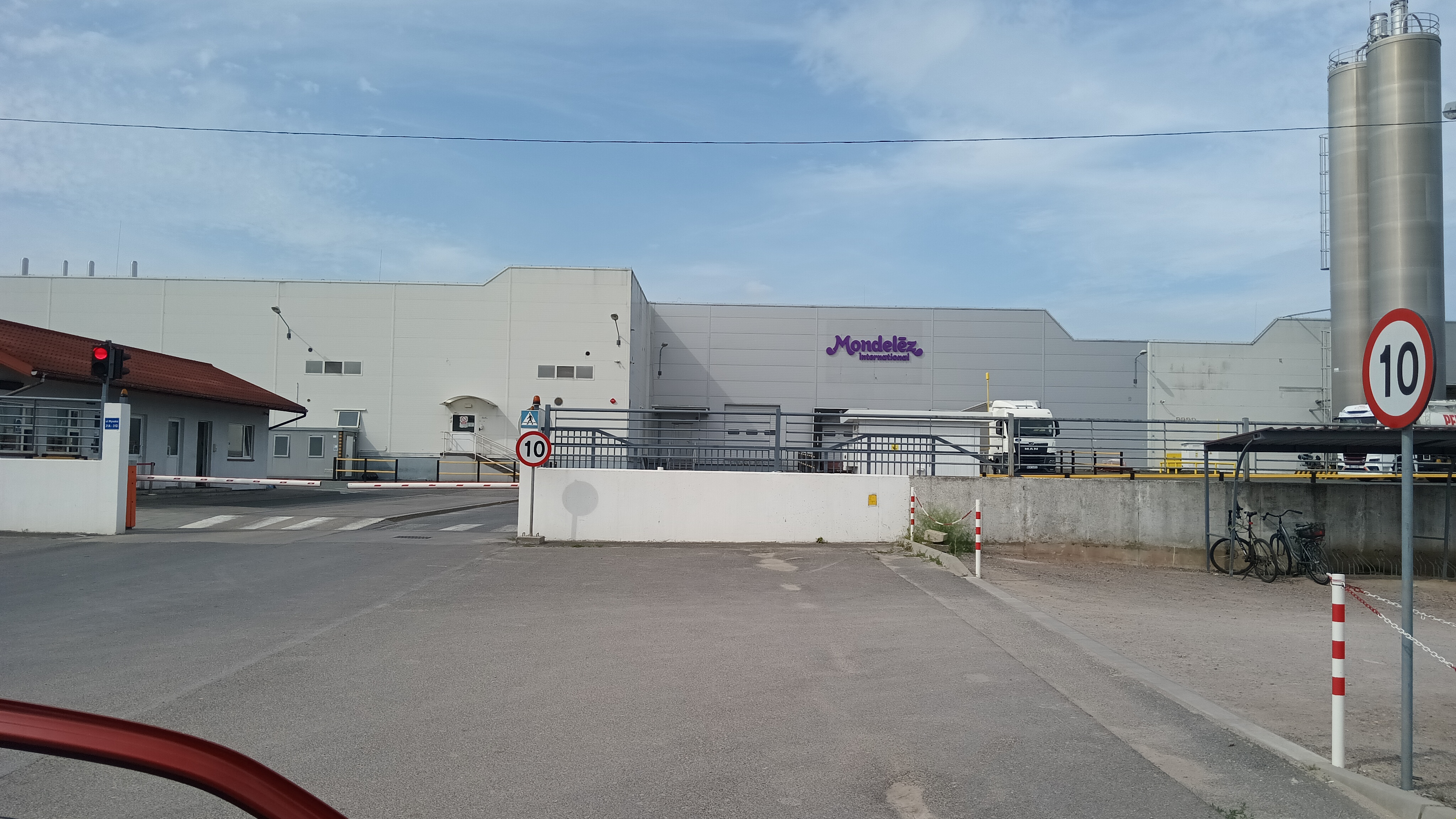
Mondelēz International factory in Tomaszów Mazowiecki

Within Tomaszów's food and beverage sector PepsiCo produces the famous Cheetos crisps, Mondelēz produces croissants and Roldrob (Drosed) produces poultry products for customers such as KFC.

=== Logistics and services sector ===
Other companies in the region specializing in logistics and services are FM Logistic, serving Carrefour and Makro Cash and Carry, and Syntom, a recycling company.

== Sport ==
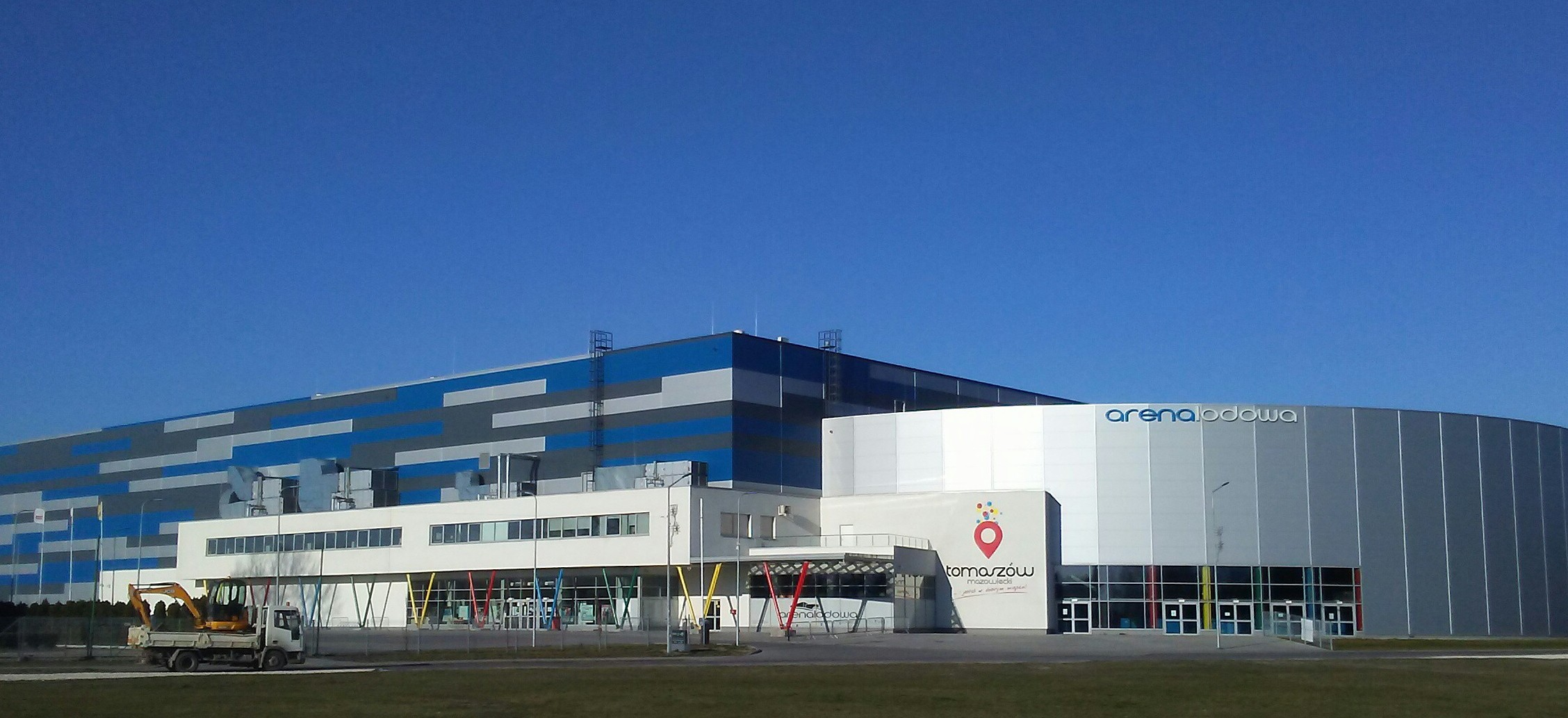
Ice Arena Tomaszów Mazowiecki

The town's most notable sport clubs are Lechia Tomaszów Mazowiecki with football and volleyball sections and Pilica Tomaszów Mazowiecki with speed skating and bowling sections.

The sports venue Ice Arena Tomaszów Mazowiecki hosts main international speed skating competitions; including ISU Speed Skating World Cups. It is also an ice hockey venue.

== Education ==
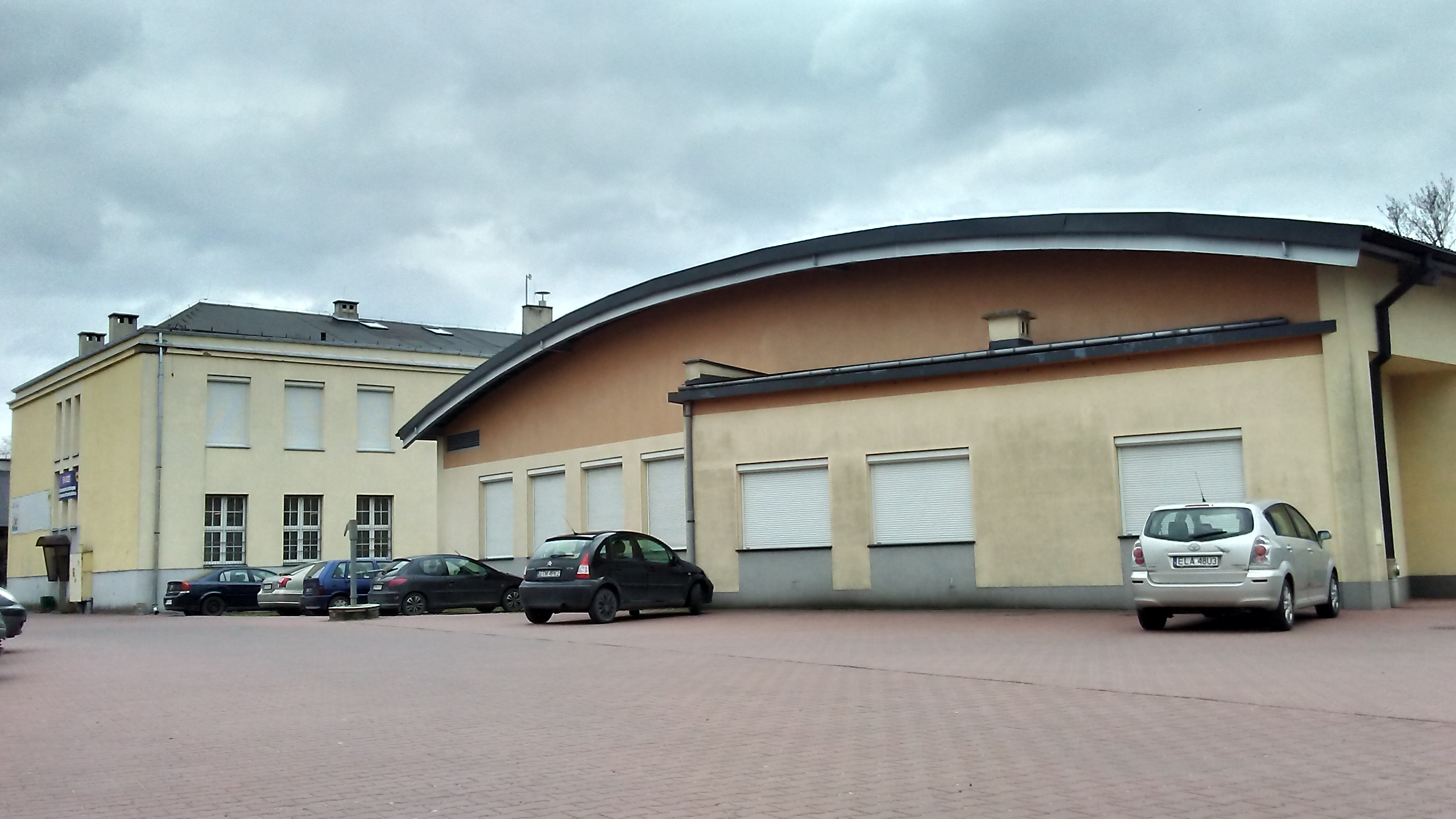
Branch of University of Łódź in Tomaszów Mazowiecki (four departments)

There are seven high schools in Tomaszów Mazowiecki as well as branches of notable universities including:

- Branch of University of Łódź
- Branch of Pułaski University of Technology and Humanities in Radom (pl)
- Branch of Wyższa Szkoła Biznesu i Przedsiębiorczości in Ostrowiec (pl)

== Points of interest ==
In the city there is first in Poland year-round ice skating rink that serves for speed skating, figure skating, ice hockey, short track and roller skating. It is located near Pilica River.

During the occupation of Poland in World War II, several strategic bunkers were built by Nazi Germany near Tomaszów Mazowiecki. The construction of the two large air-raid shelters was started in early 1940. The so-called Konewka Bunkers (now a tourist attraction) were a complex of various concrete structures hidden in the woods, including an enormous 380 metres (1,250 ft) long bunker capable of protecting an entire trainset from the possible air raid. The shelters in Konewka and in Jeleń, built of reinforced concrete, served as unloading stations for military cargo.

=== Sulejowski Reservoir ===
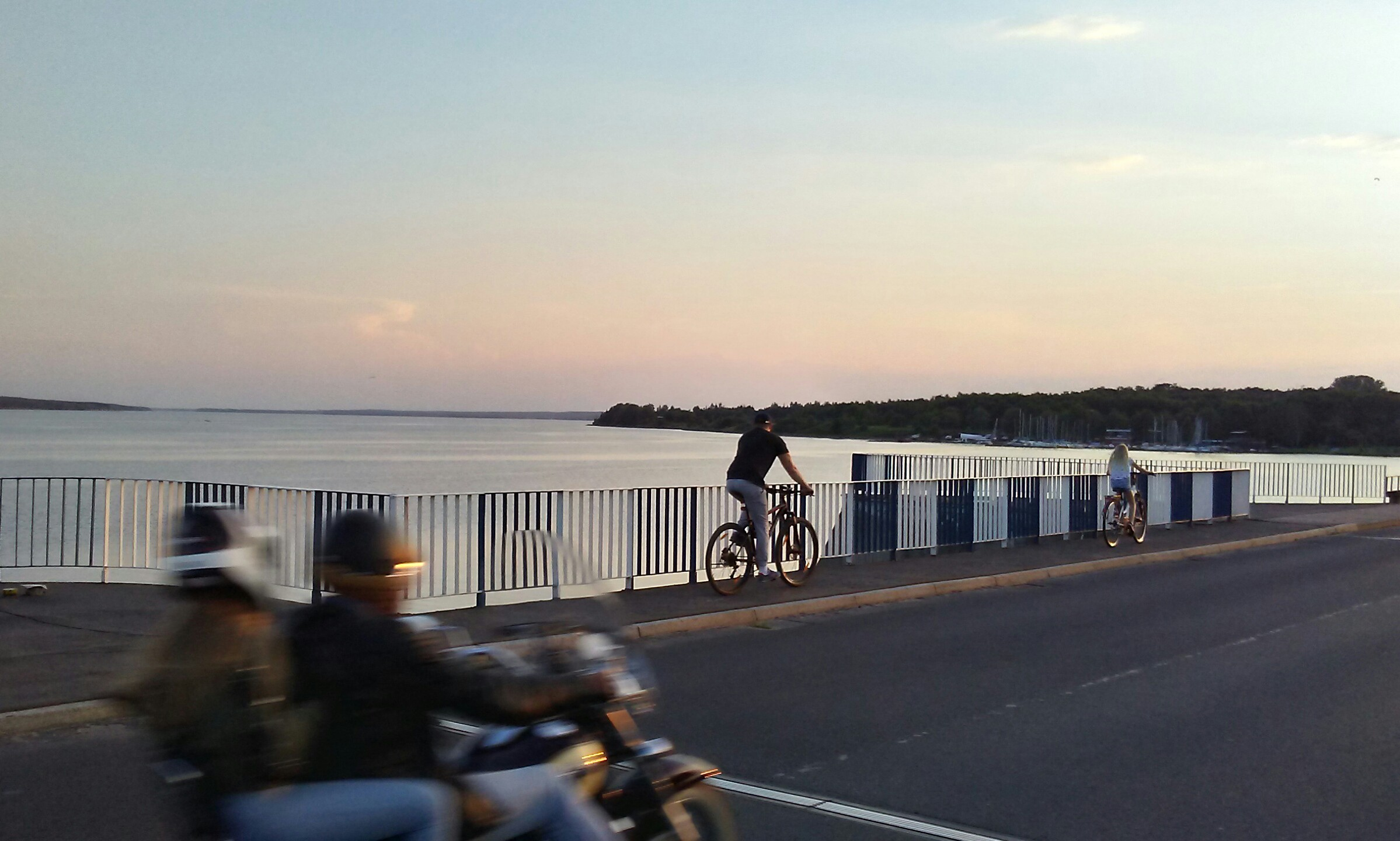
Sulejowski Reservoir, 7 km from the town center

The Sulejow Lake is a large reservoir built from 1969–1973 in order to help meet the demand for fresh drinking water in the city of Łódź and the city of Tomaszów Mazowiecki. The reservoir is situated on the territory of three gminas: Tomaszów, Piotrków and Wolbórz. It is a popular place for water sports, including windsurfing, canoeing and sailing.

=== Grottoes in Nagórzyce (district of Tomaszów) ===
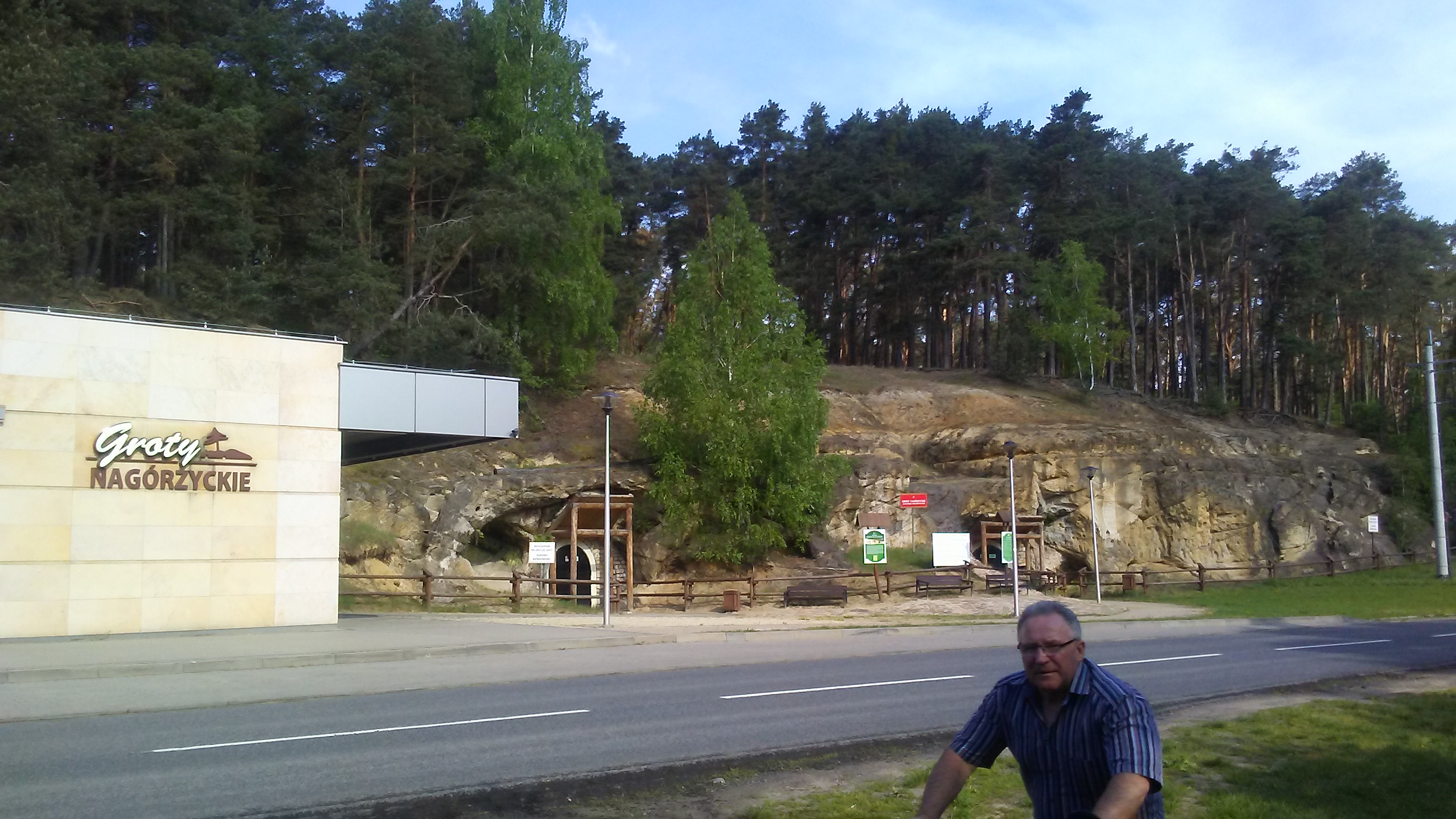
Grottoes in Nagórzyce (southern Tomaszów)

In the south of the town there is an eighteenth-century quartz sand mine - The Nagórzyckie Grottoes (Polish: Groty Nagórzyckie). Today, an underground tourist route. At the entrance there is a pavilion with ticket desk, food vending machines and public toilets. They can be reached from the town center by a city bus or by an illuminated bicycle path.

== Transport ==
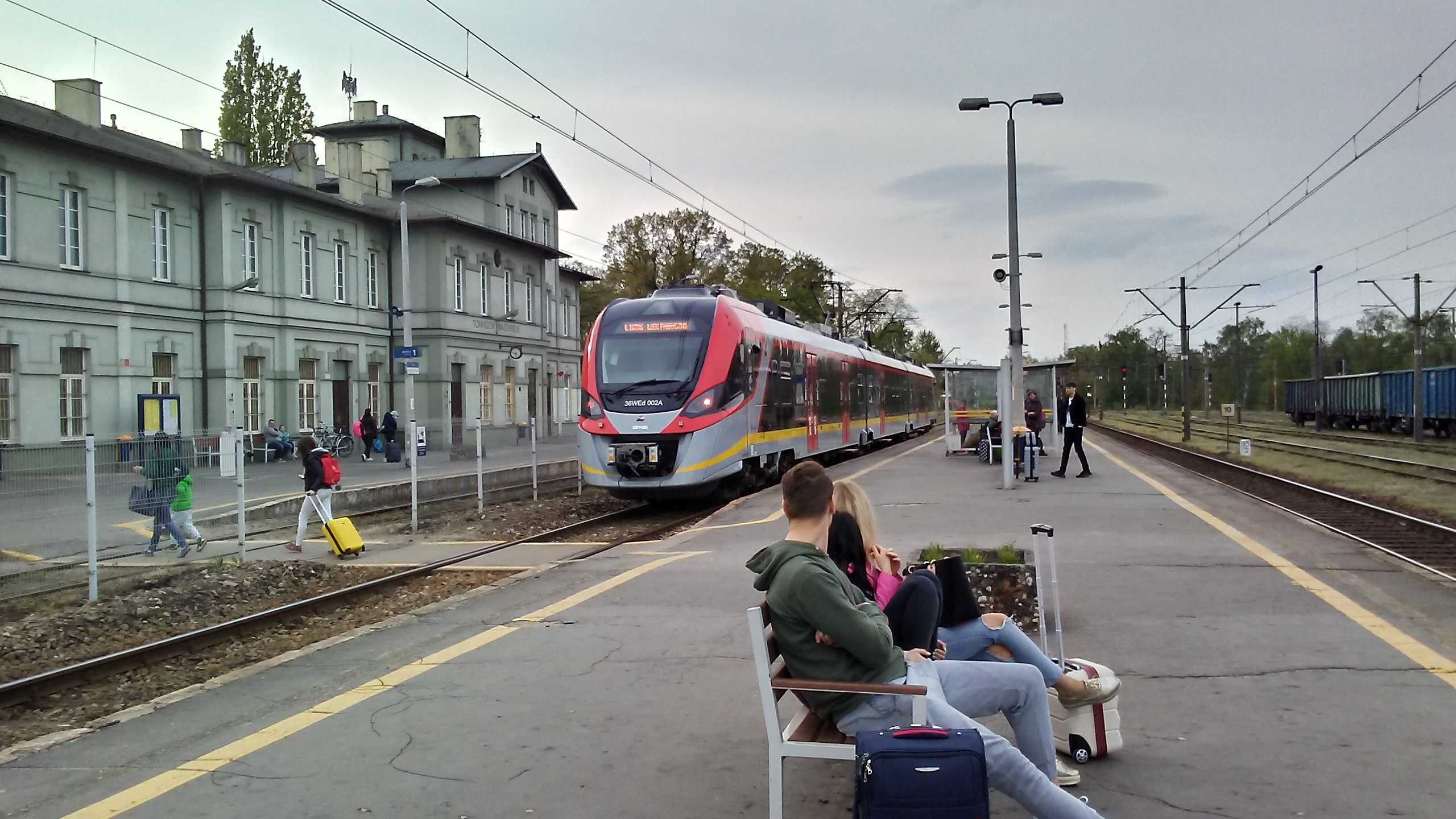
The railway station in Tomaszów Mazowiecki, May 2019

Public transportation by buses was established in 1929. Since 2018, public transport in the city is free of charge.

Directly by train from Tomaszów it is possible to travel to: Kraków, Łodź, Poznań, Gdynia, Szczecin.

Several national and regional routes cross each other in the city:

- S 8 direction Suwałki – Warsaw – Tomaszów Mazowiecki – Wrocław – Kudowa-Zdrój
- DK 48 direction Kozienice – Dęblin – Kock
- DW 713 direction Łódź – Tomaszów Mazowiecki – Januszewice near Opoczno

== Twin towns – sister cities ==
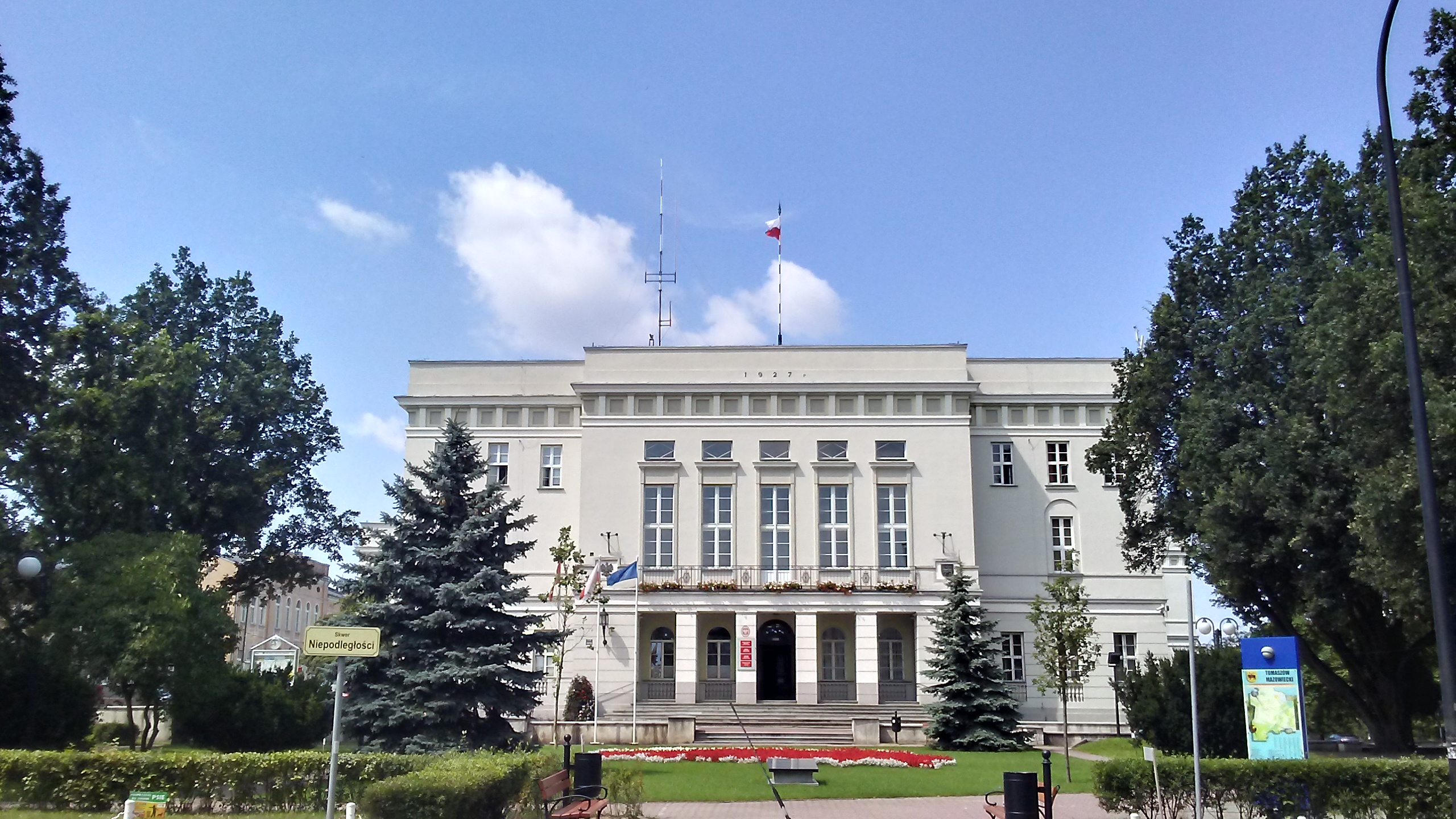
City Hall

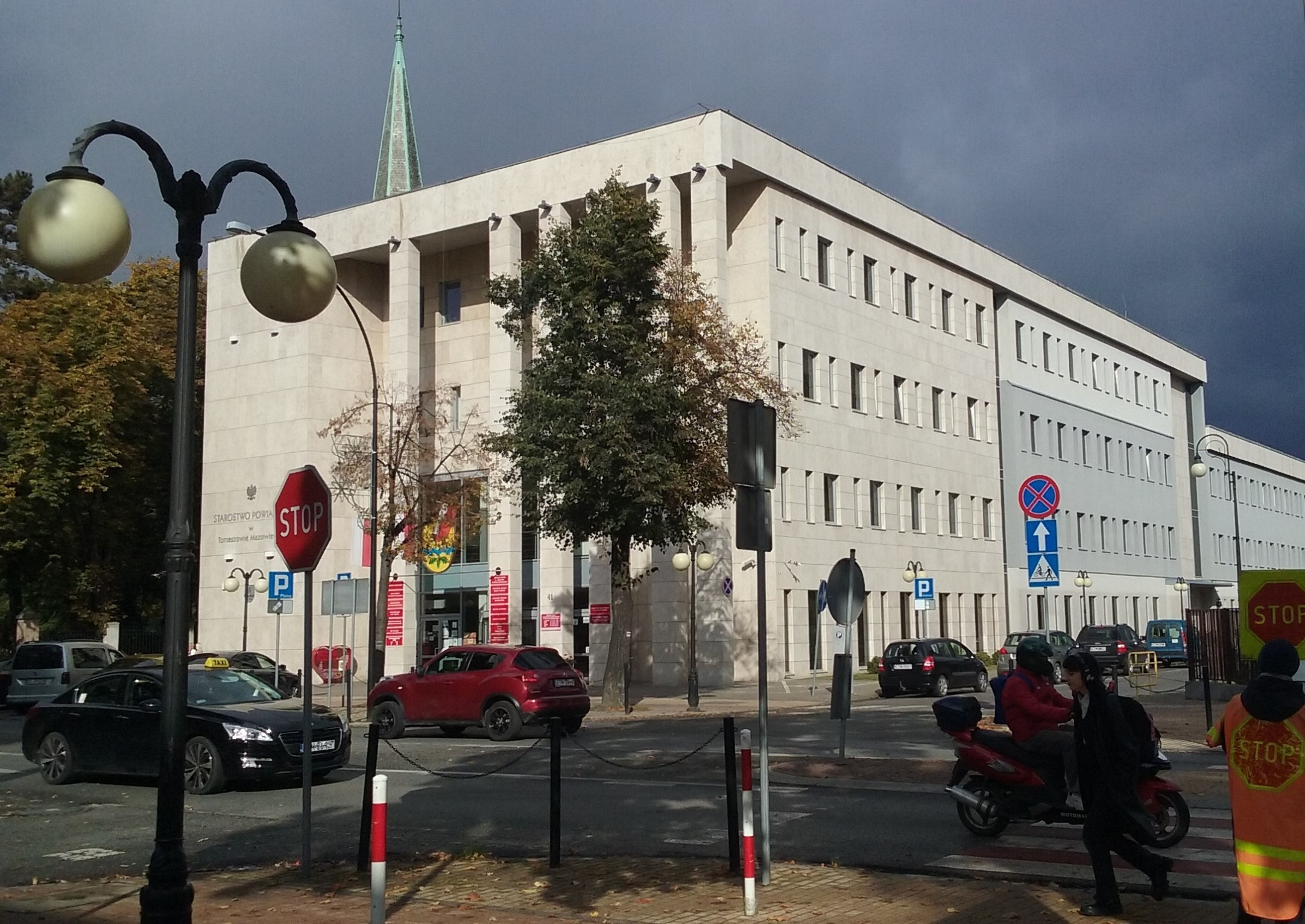
County Hall

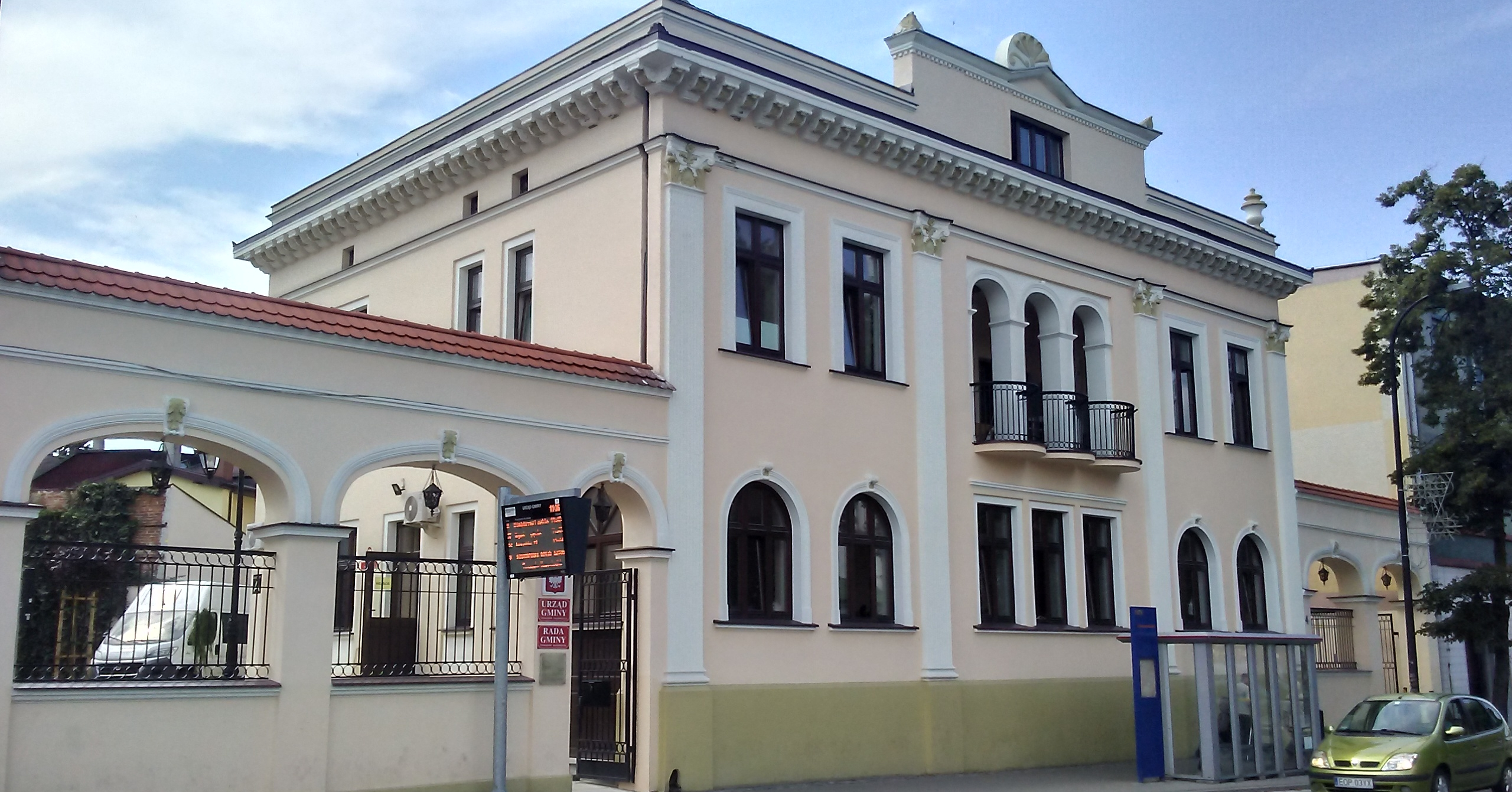
Gmina Hall

Tomaszów Mazowiecki is twinned with:

- Ivano-Frankivsk, Ukraine
- Linares, Spain
- Mionica, Serbia
- Polonezköy (Beykoz), Turkey

== Polish Armed Forces ==
The march of soldiers of the Tomaszów Air Cavalry on the main square of Tomaszów before the city celebration in 2019.

The 25th Air Cavalry Brigade is garrisoned in Tomaszów Mazowiecki. Headquarters there are in the town and main barracks. Garnison Polish Armed Forces in Tomaszów Mazowiecki has existed since 1918. At the north-eastern border of the town, by Expressway S8 there is the Brigade airport (Tomaszów Mazowiecki Airport).

== Notable people ==
- Karolina Bosiek (born 2000), Polish speed skater
- Maria Ciach (1933–2008), Polish javelin thrower
- Tadeusz Chmielewski (1927–2016), Polish film director, screenwriter and film producer
- Moshe Dluznowsky (1903–1977), Polish-born Jewish-American journalist, publicist, writer
- Mirosława Jastrzębska (1921–1982), curator of the Regional Museum in Tomaszów Mazowiecki
- Heidi Knake-Werner (born 1943), German politician (Die Linke)
- Izabela Kuna (born 1970), Polish actress
- Cezary Pazura (born 1962), Polish film, theatre and dubbing actor
- Oskar Lange (1904–1965), Polish economist
- Bogusław Mec (born 1947), Polish singer
- Bolesław Mołojec (1909–1942), Polish communist activist, prominent commander in The International Brigades during War in Spain
- Wanda Panfil-González (born 1959), Polish long-distance runner
- Jaromir Radke (born 1969), Polish speed skater
- Michael Sela (1924–2022), Israeli immunologist; President of the Weizmann Institute of Science

== Gallery ==
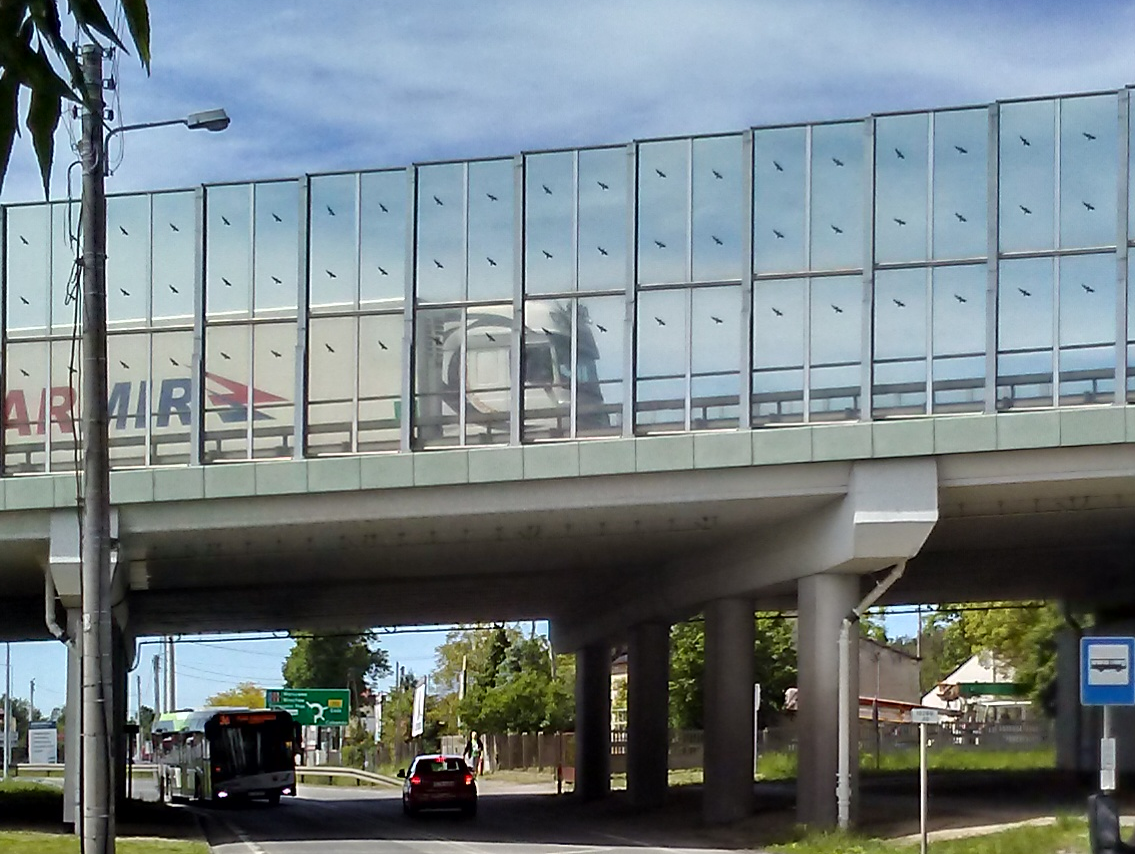
The expressway S8 (Białystok – Warsaw - Wrocław / Katowice), over Ujezdzka Street in Tomaszów Mazowiecki

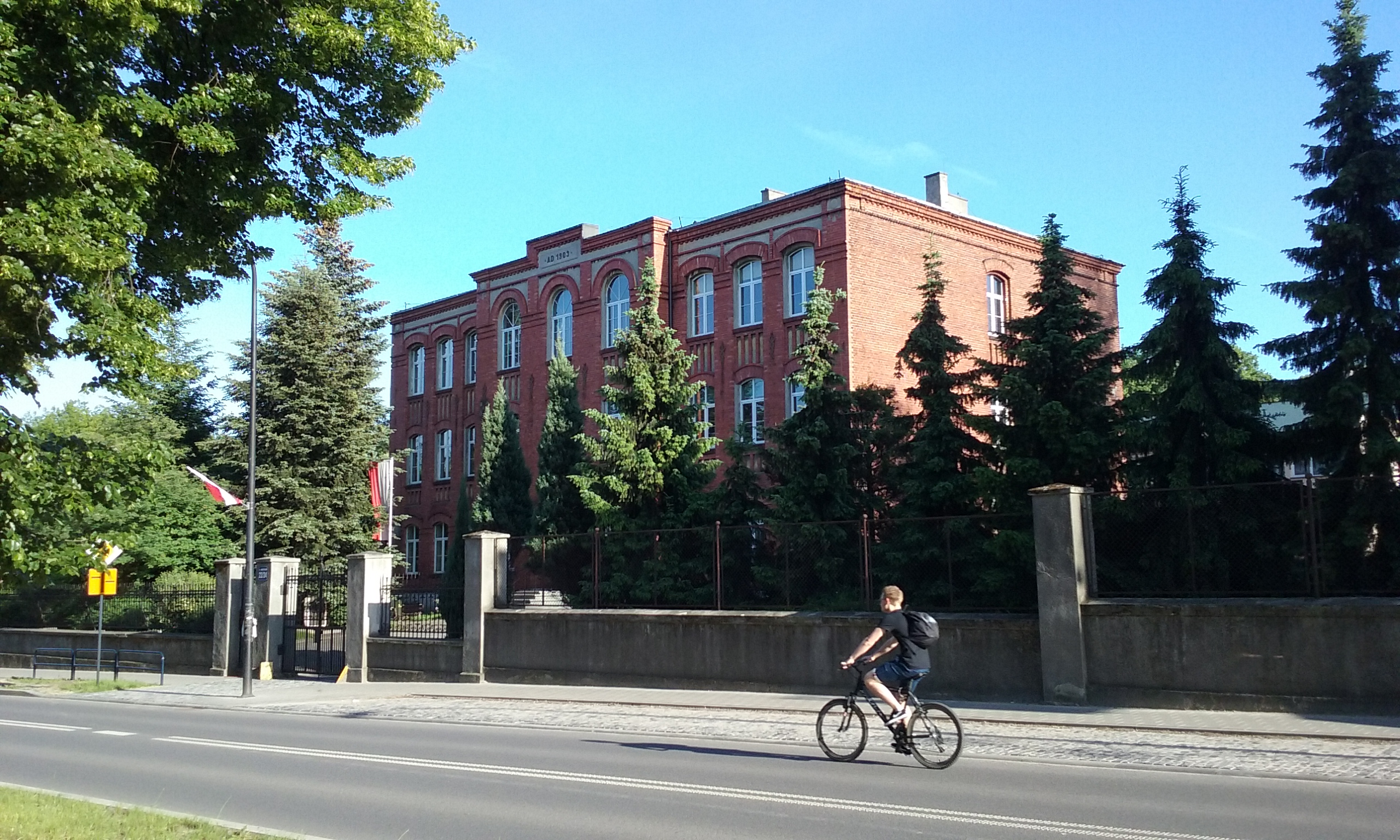
The oldest secondary school (AD 1903) Listed in the rank of the top 500 schools in Poland

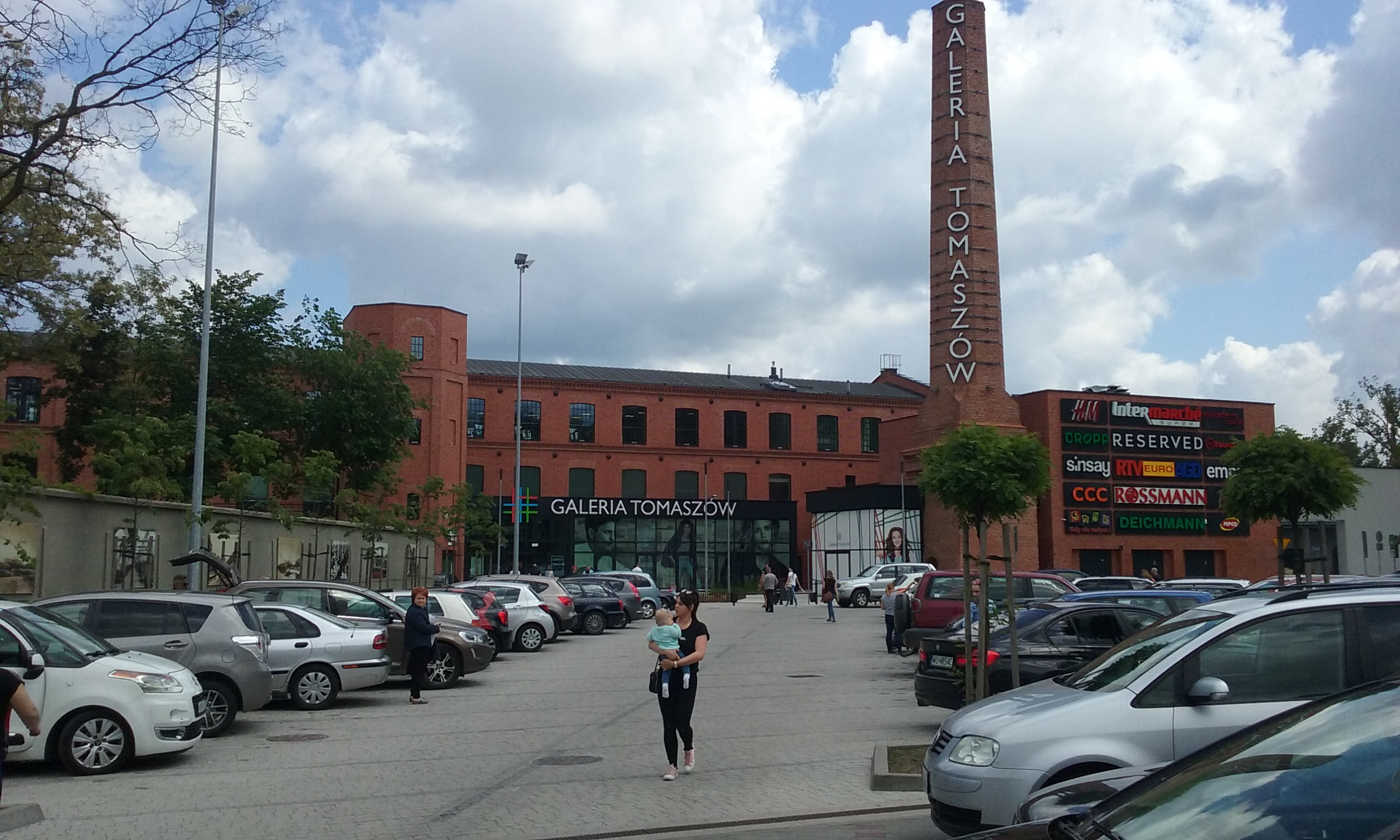
The largest shopping center- "Galeria Tomaszów", former textile factory

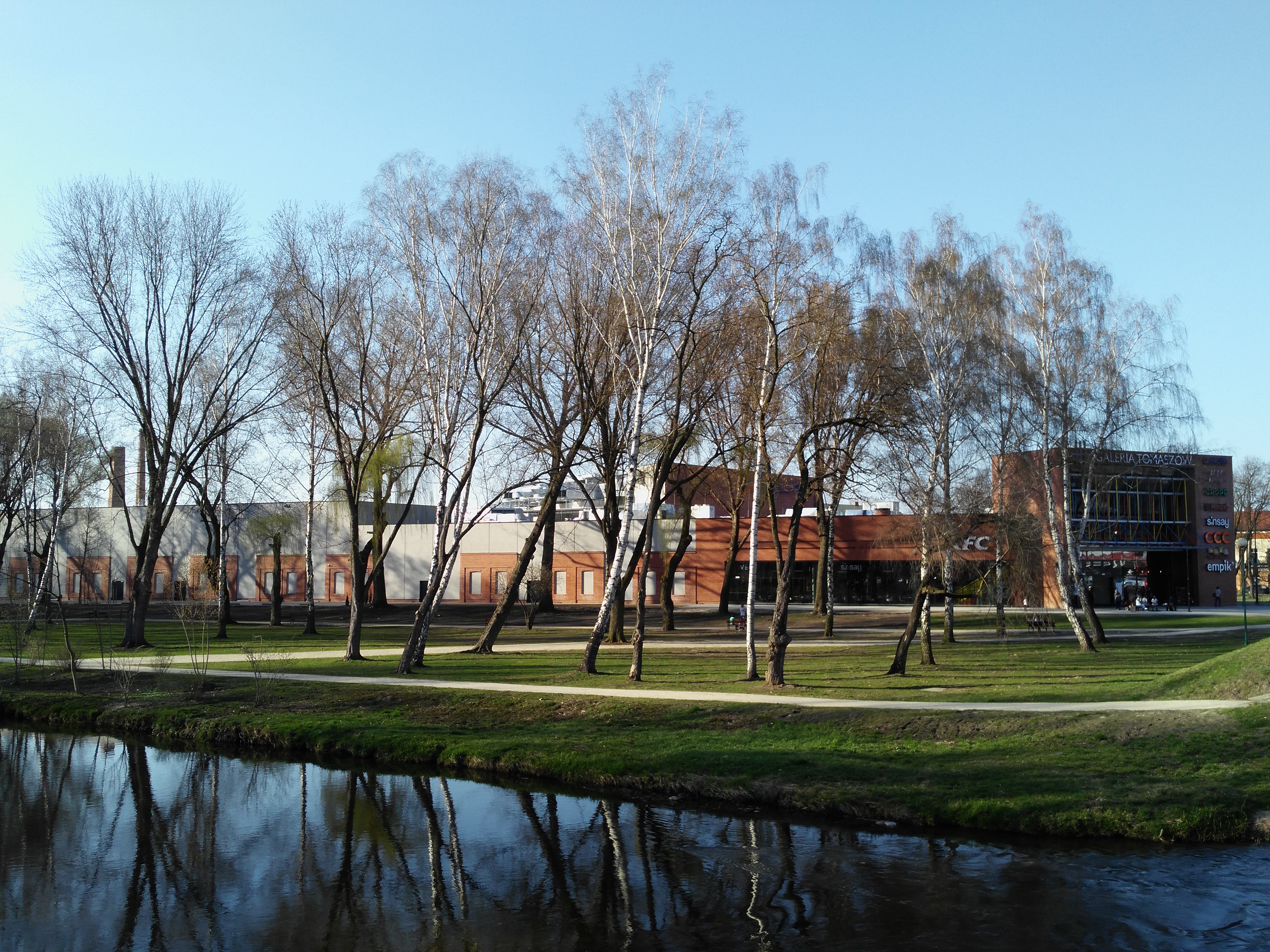
The largest shopping center on the Wolbórka river - "Galeria Tomaszów"

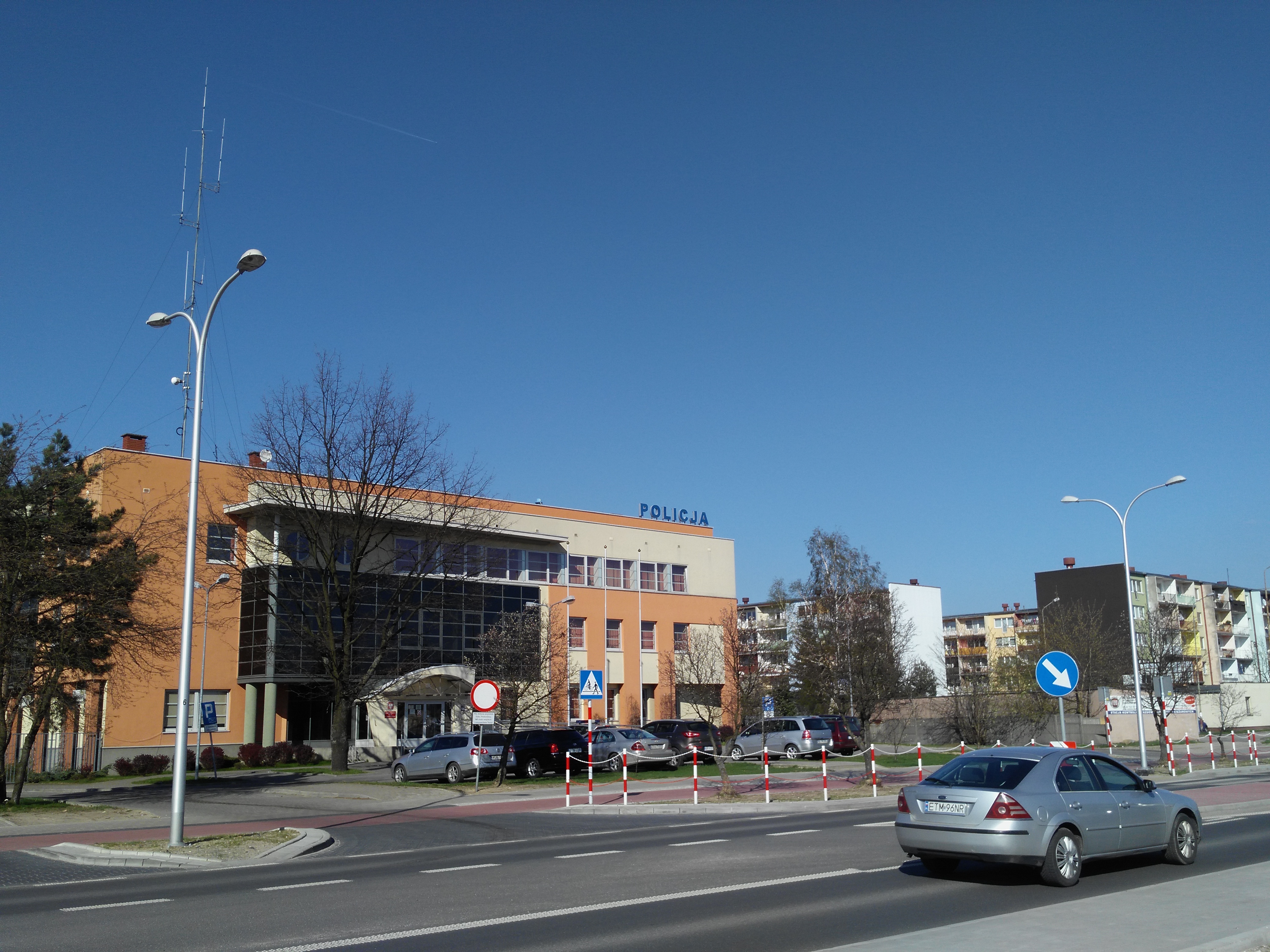
Police station

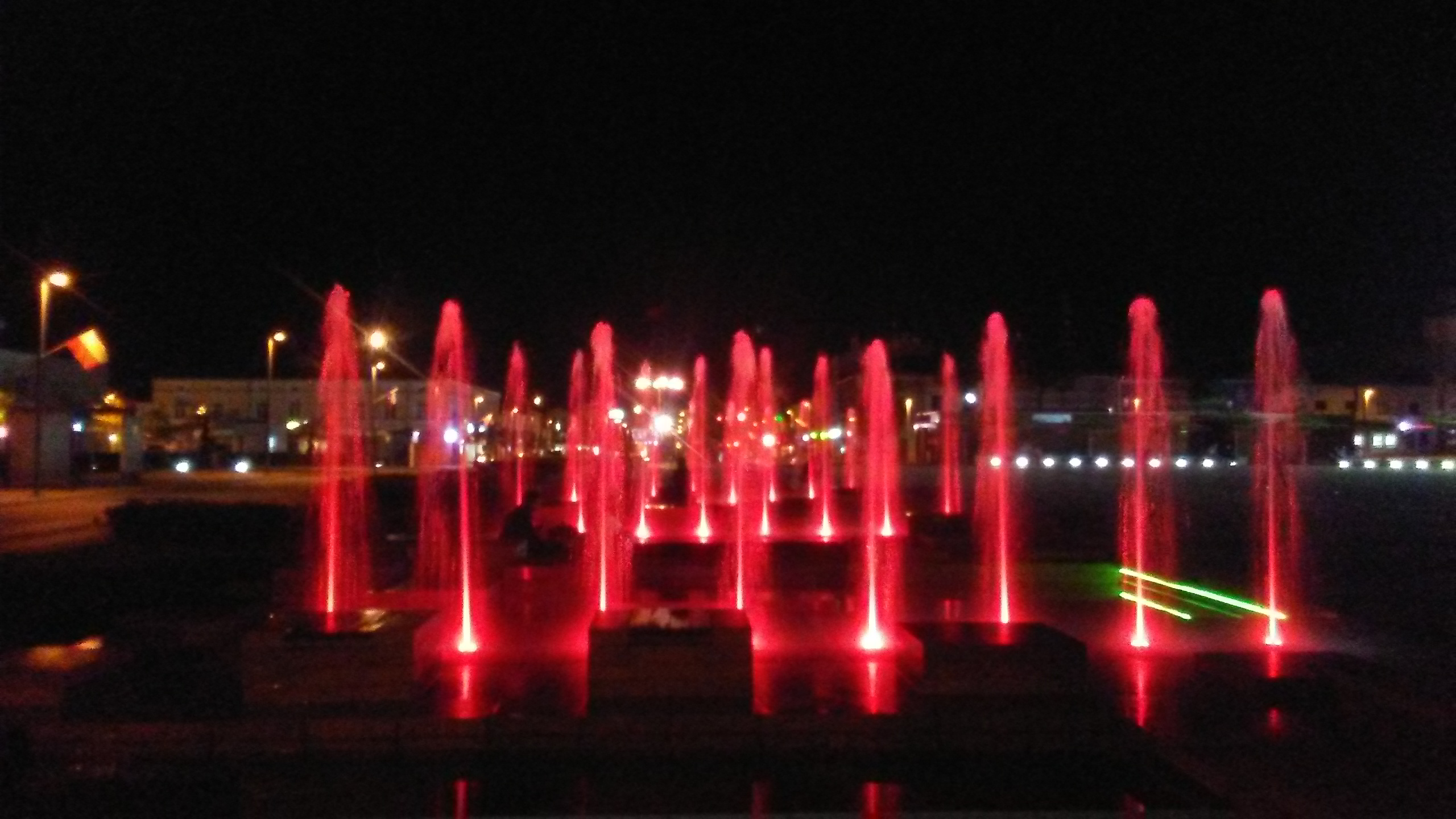
Main square by night

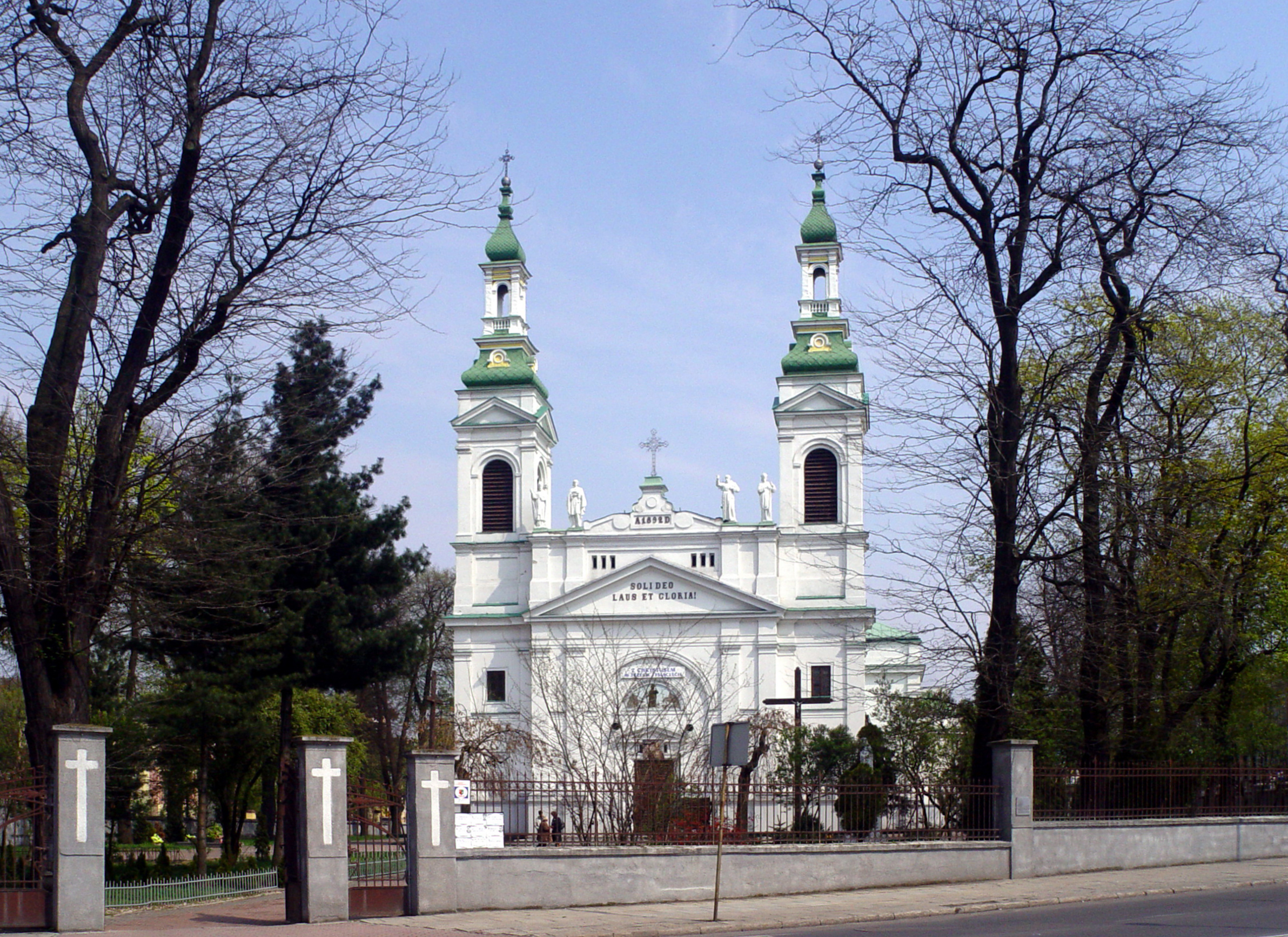
Parish church of St Anthony

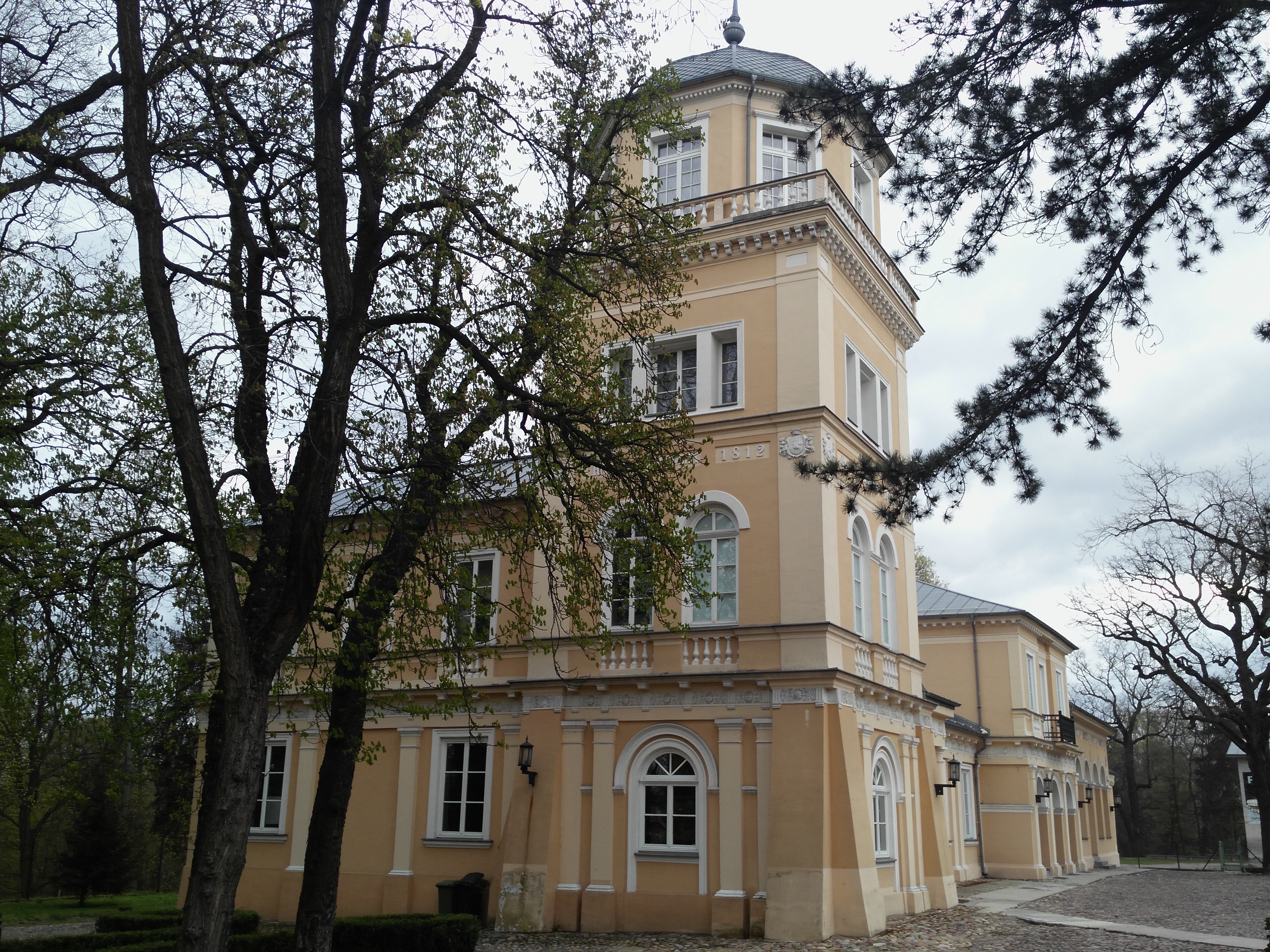
The Ostrowski Palace, built in 1812. Now, regional museum.

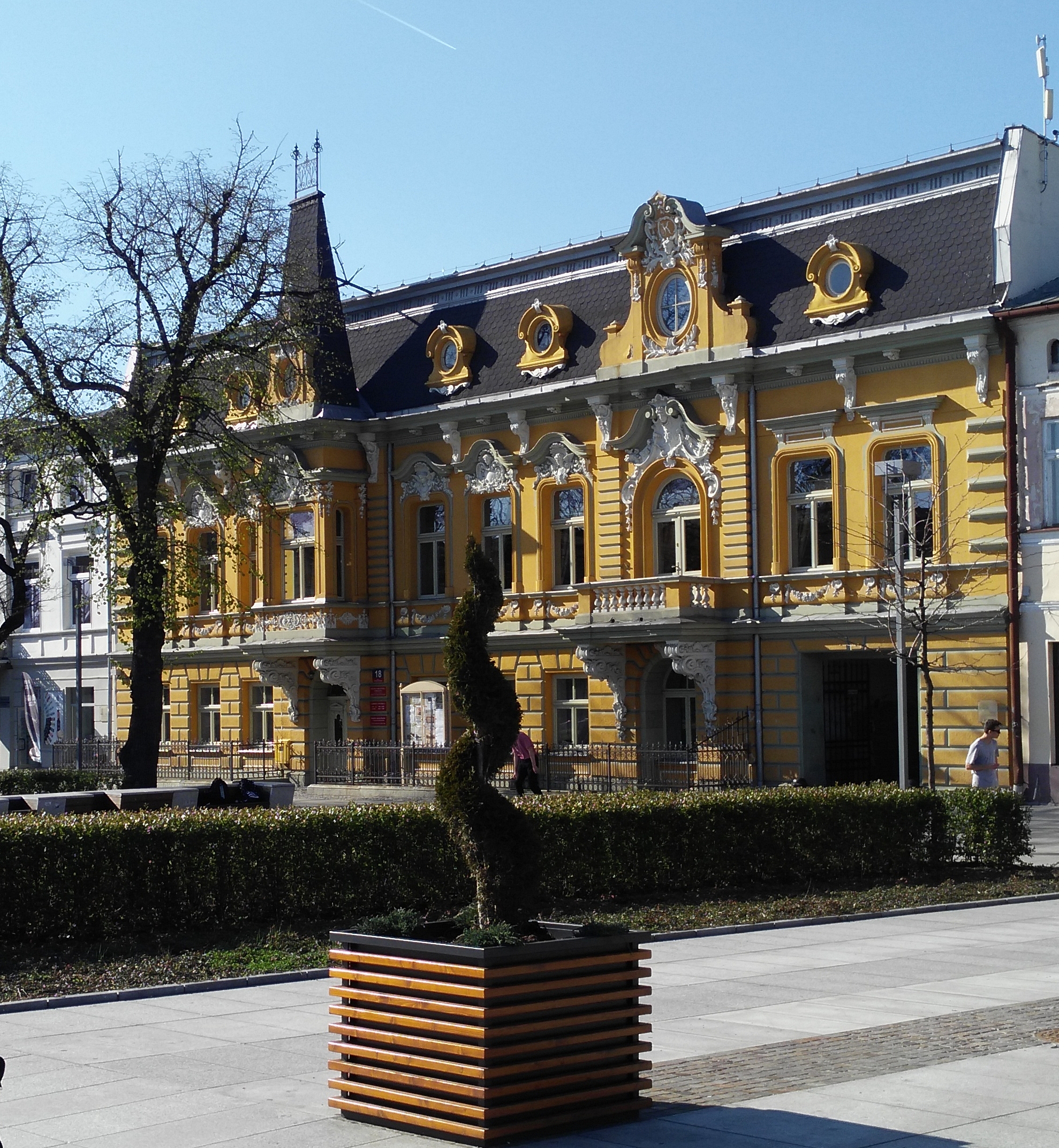
The Knothe Family house. Now, children's library

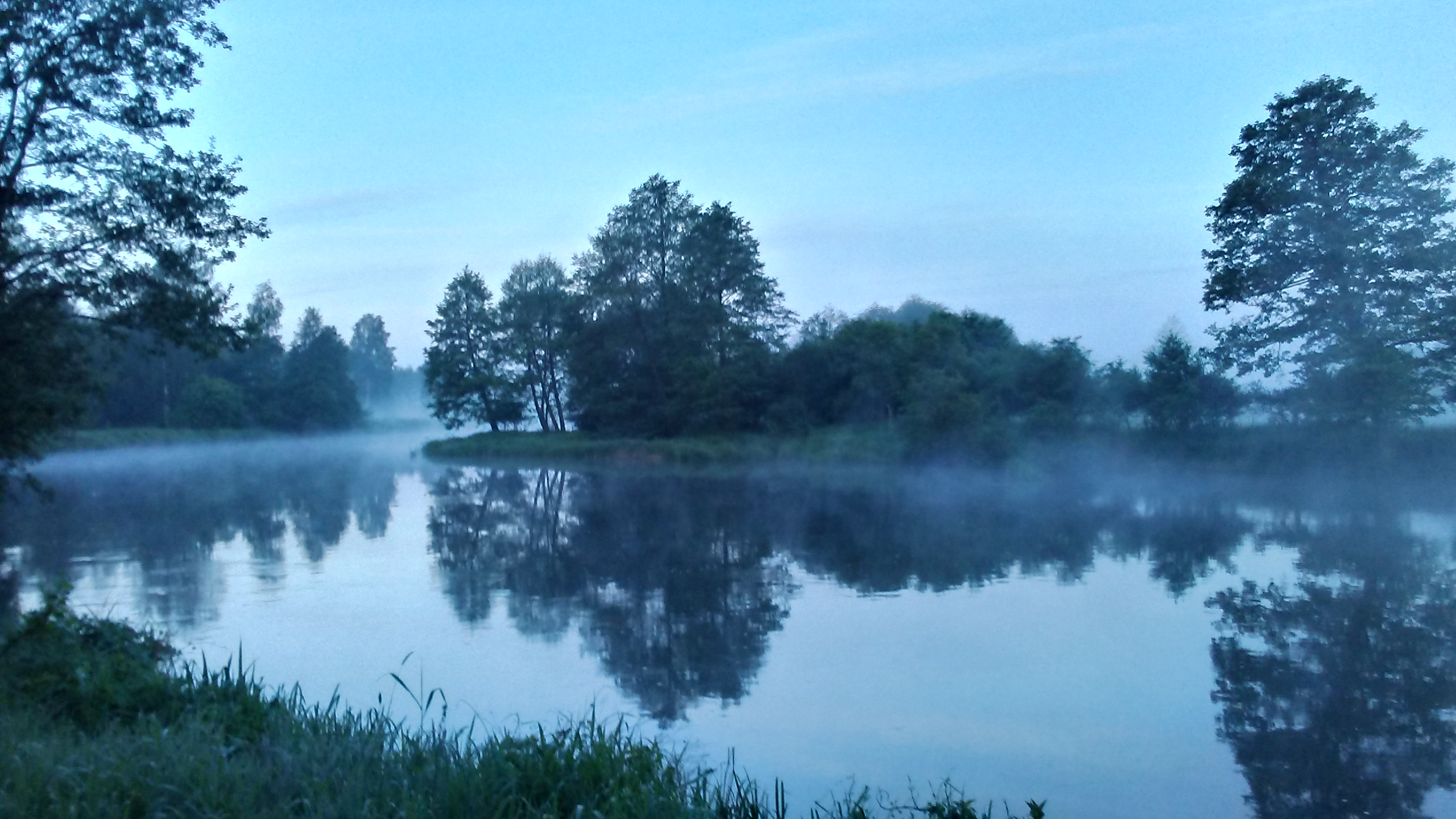
Pilica River in Tomaszów

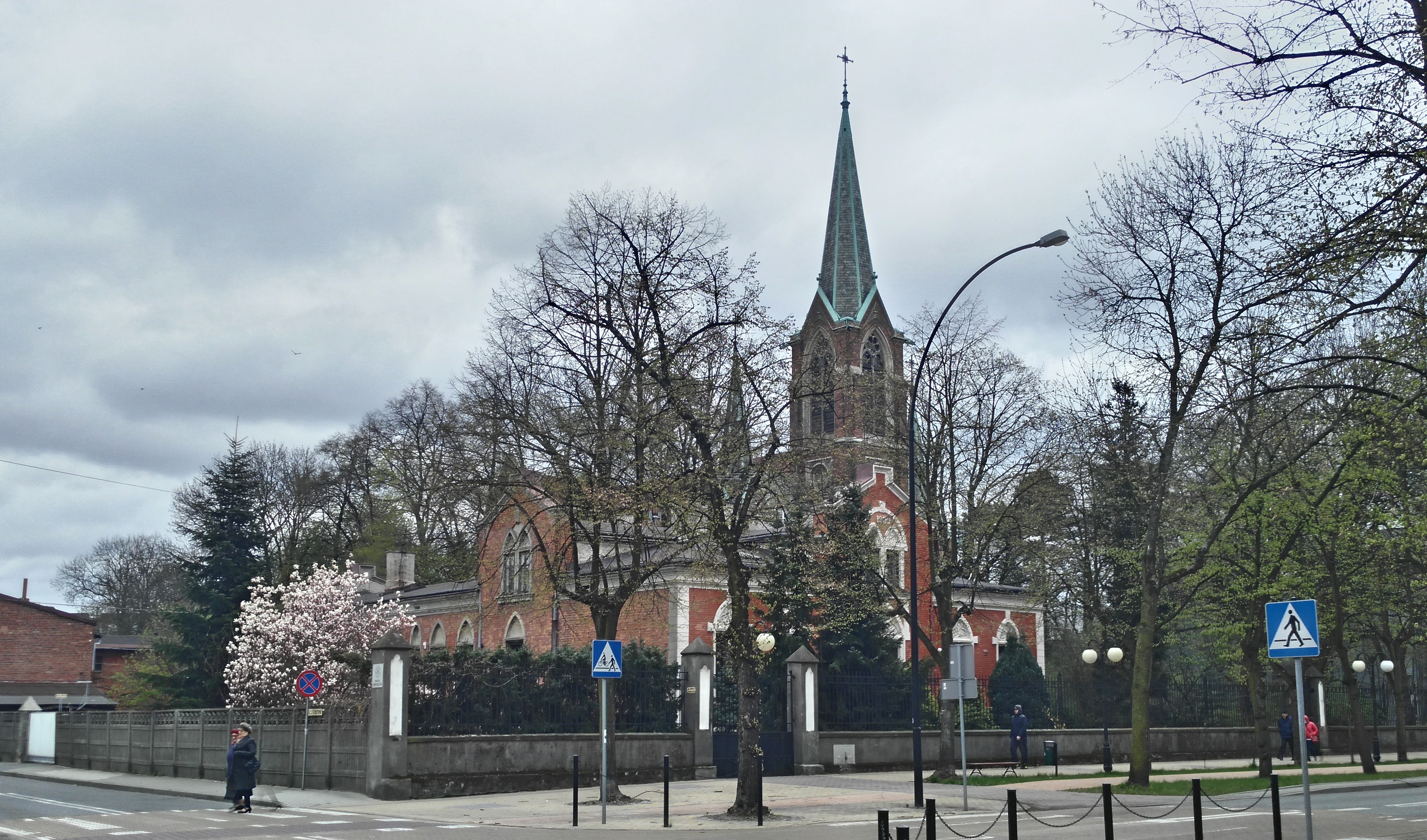
Evangelical-Augsburg Church

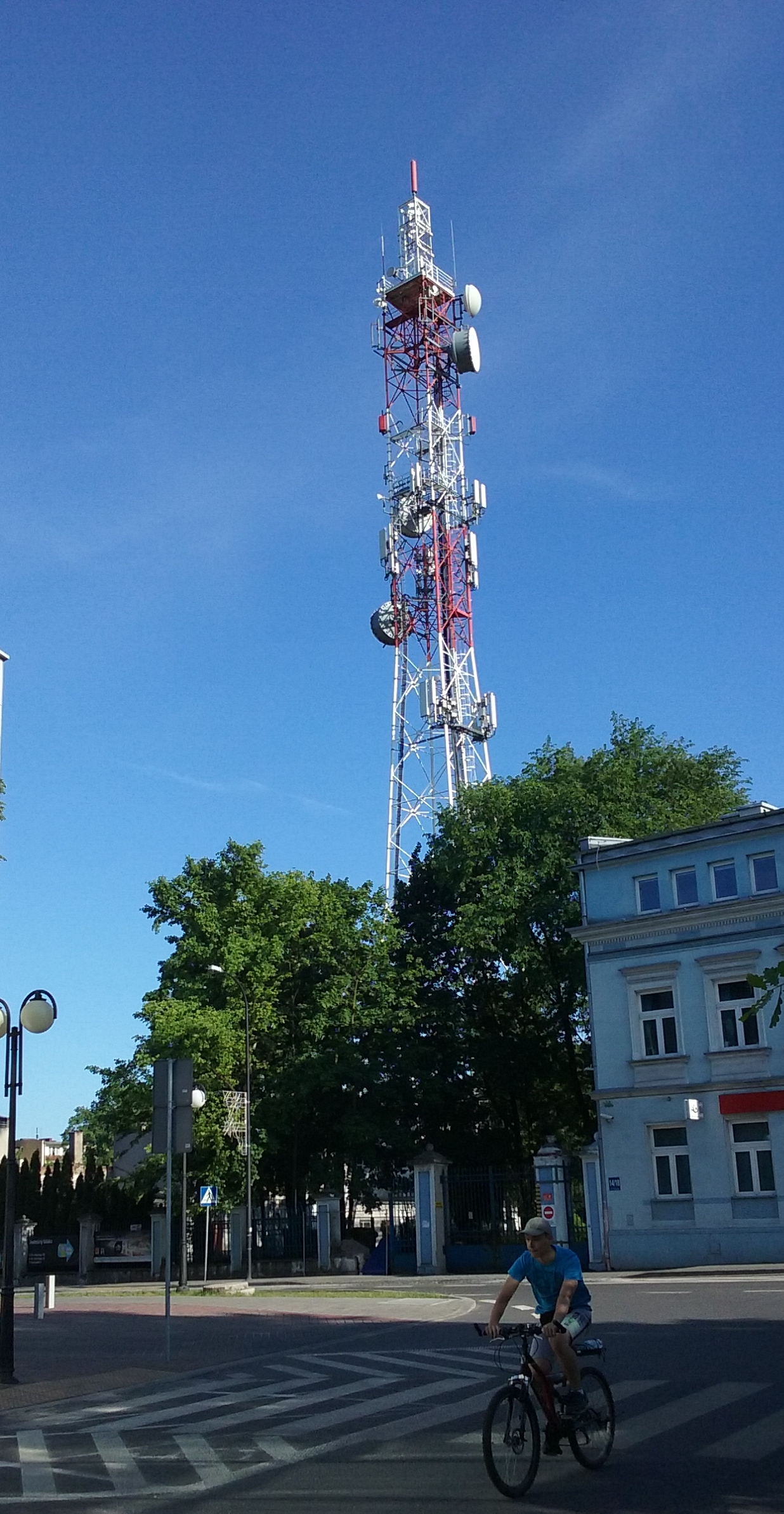
100 meters high television mast in the telecommunications complex in the city center

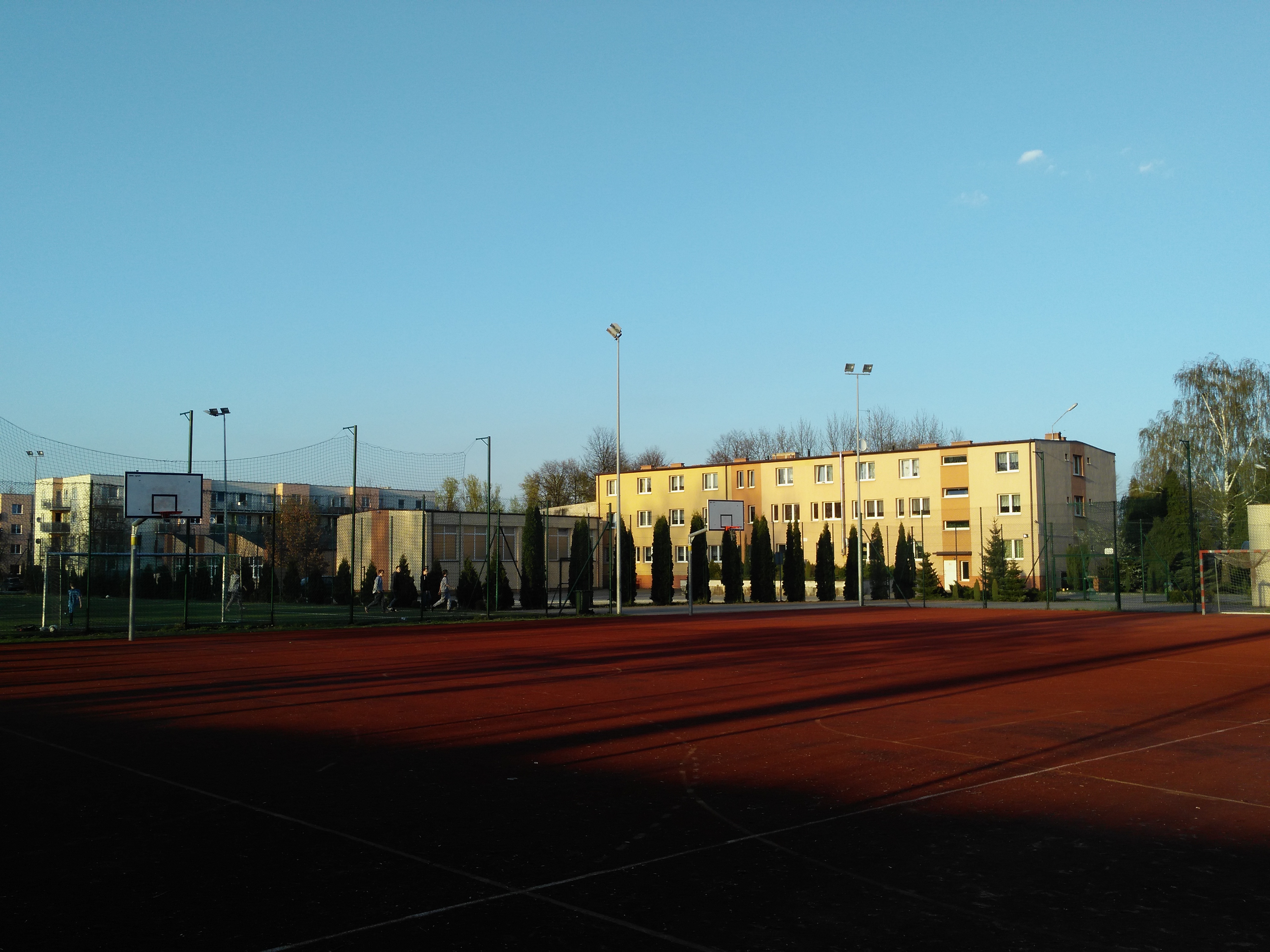
Complex of special schools

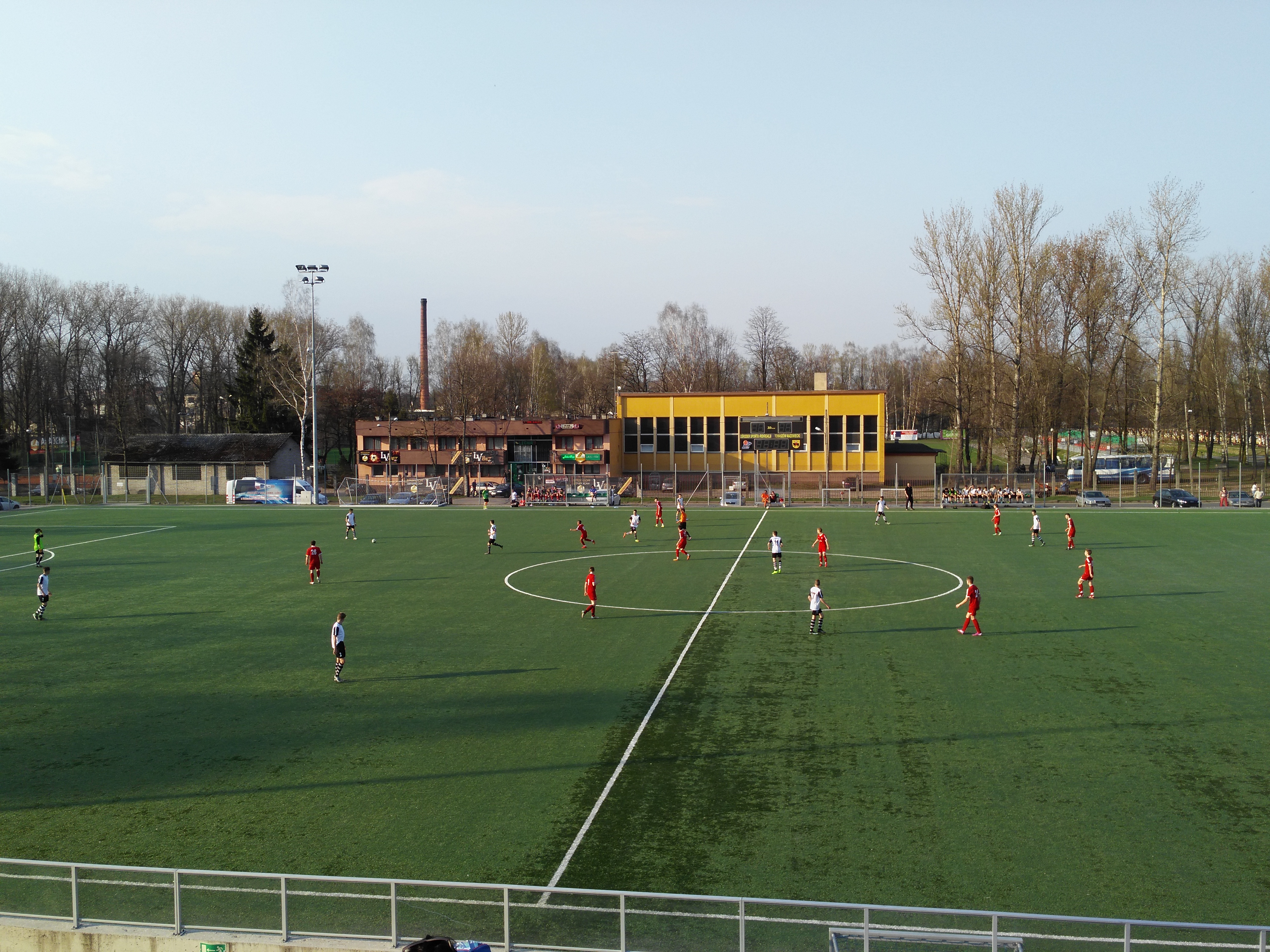
One of stadiums of city football club "Lechia 1923"

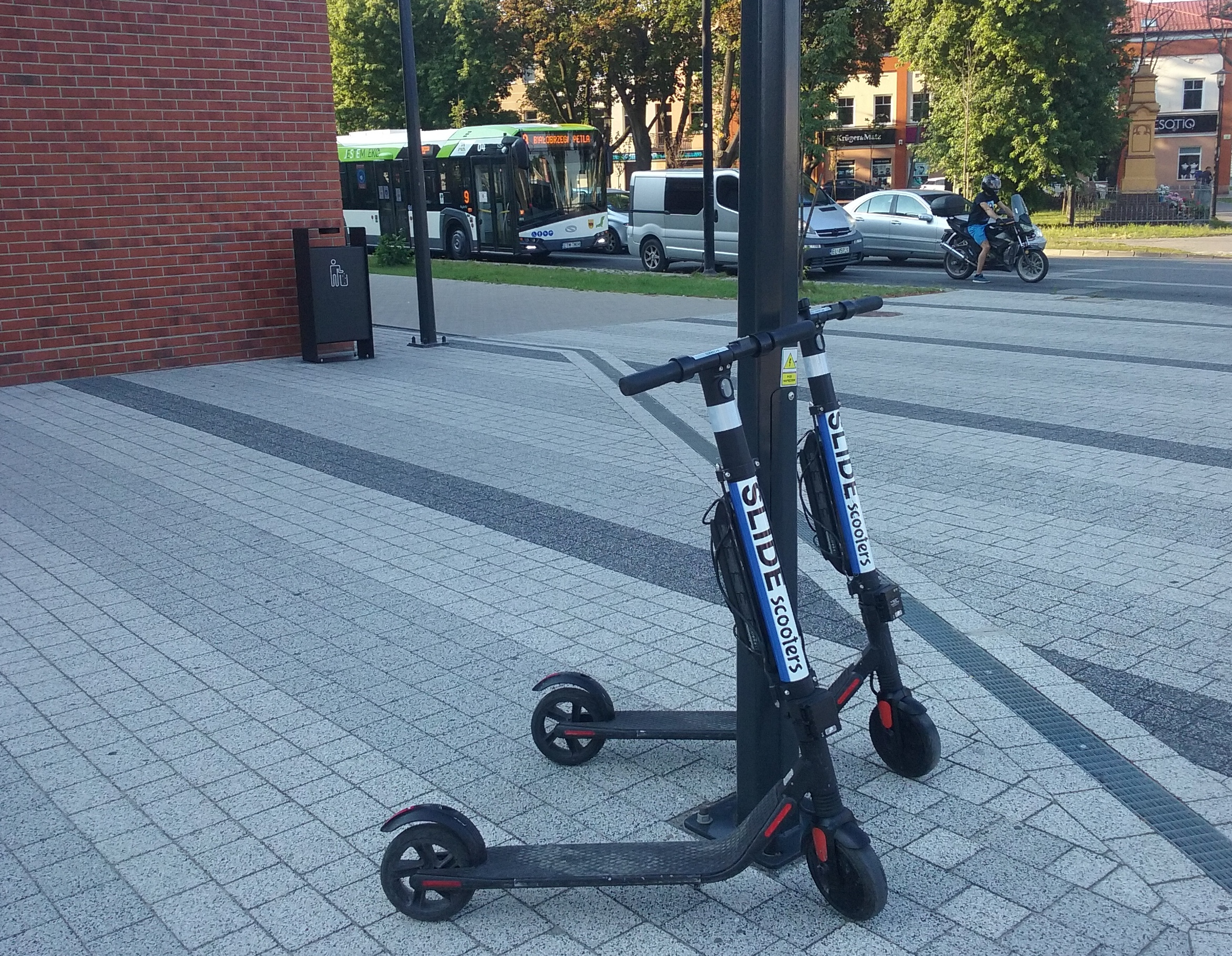
Electric kick scooters on the street (August 2020)

Residents of Tomaszów on the main square of the town (end of December 2022)

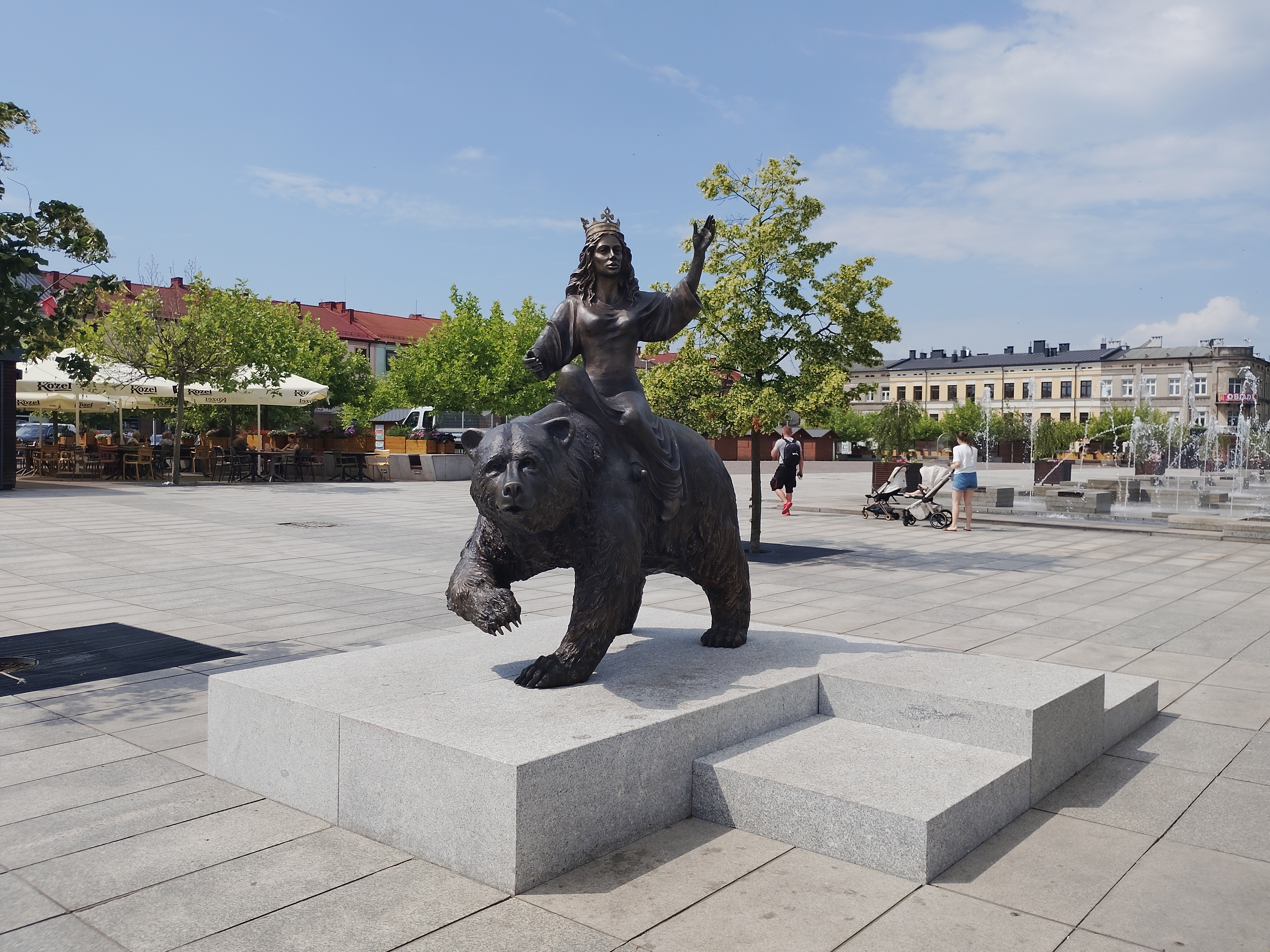
The monument of The Princess on The Bear, the symbol of Tomaszów. The main square of the city
