= Nagórzyckie Grottoes in Tomaszów Mazowiecki =

The Nagórzyckie Grottoes in Tomaszów Mazowiecki
- Groty Nagórzyckie w Tomaszowie Mazowieckim (Polish)
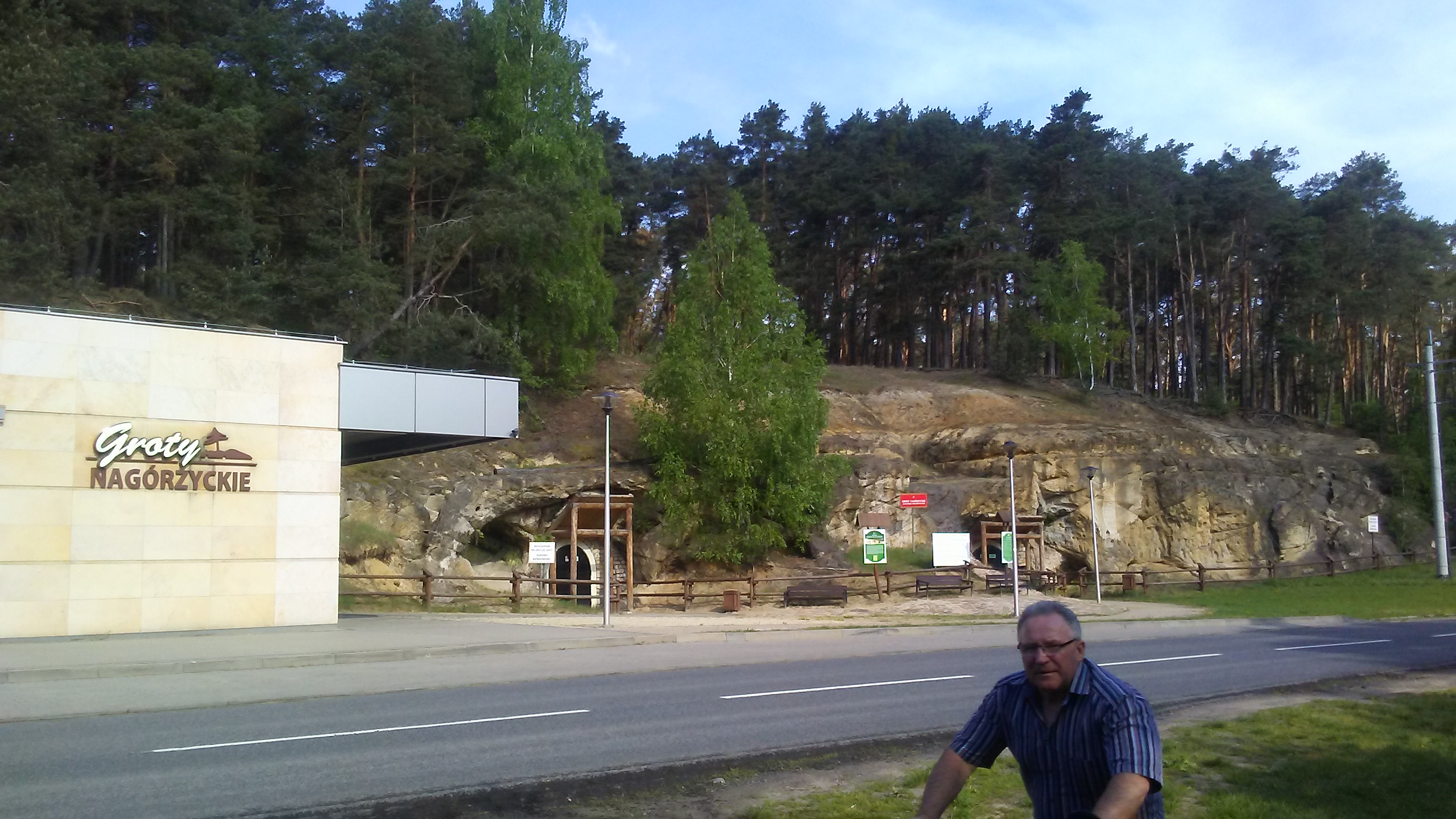
- Outside view from Pilica river side

- Location within Poland
- Location: Tomaszów Mazowiecki
- Coordinates: 51°29′56″N 19°59′42″E
- Length: 3.720 m²
- Geology: Cretaceous
- Entrances: 2
- Access: with guide
- Website: http://grotynagorzyckie.pl/

The Nagórzyckie Grottoes in Tomaszów Mazowiecki (pol. Groty Nagórzyckie w Tomaszowie Mazowieckim. Also known as: Nagórzyckie Caves) – the former underground quartz sand mine in the southern part of Tomaszów Mazowiecki, Poland.

== Characteristics ==
The history of the local sandstone rocks dates back almost 100 million years, i.e. to the Cretaceous period. The grottoes are mentioned in documents and chronicles from the 18th century as a source of ”white sand”, mined by local peasants for construction purposes. The mining operations transformed small recesses into sizable caverns. In the 19th century, sand from the Nagórzyce region, containing transparent quartz, gained recognition from the global glass industry. At the beginning of the 20th century, during the extraction of sand, one of the chambers collapsed, sealing the entrance to the grottoes. After World War II, it was considered to create a wine cellar inside and to build an open–air glass–making museum. Pollution, soil, erosion and the general poor condition of the grottoes mad these plans impossible. Currently, thanks to the EU funds, The Nagórzyckie Grottoes have been renovated, secured, and made available for visiting. An underground tourist route has been created and has soon become a local tourist attraction. The largest excavation, known as the ”Royal Hall” is a 30 meters long, 25 meters wide and 3 meters high. The route runs through the central part of the excavation, and thanks to the openwork securing structures, its individual rooms and corridors are perfectly visible. Along the illuminated route there are numerous exhibits related to the history of the grottoes and the extraction of sand from the local deposits, as well as local legends. There is a legend in Polish folk culture that the crafty devil and ruthless robber "Madej" allegedly resided in The Nagórzyckie Grottoes.
