= Ciebłowice Duże =

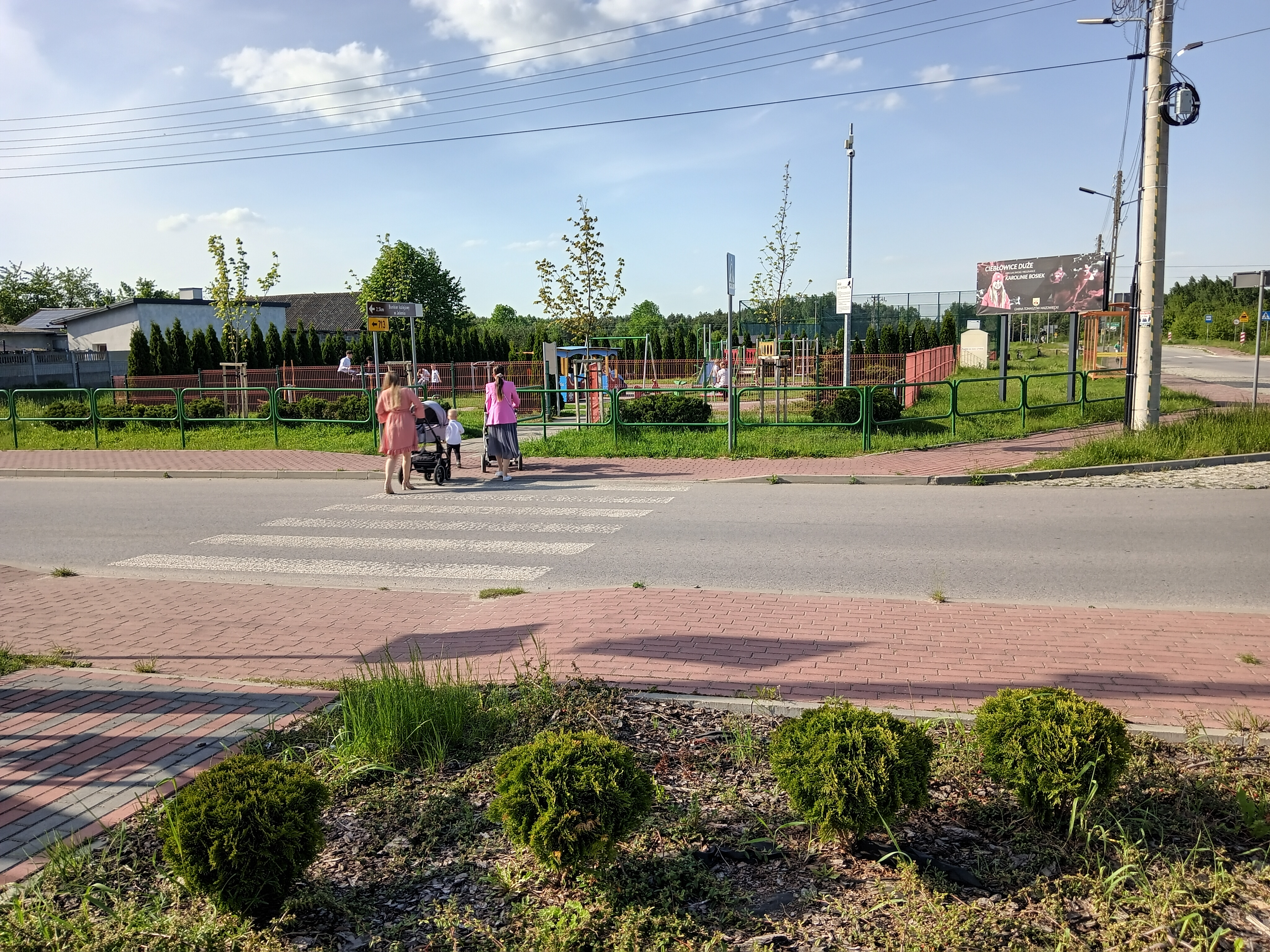

- Location within Poland
- Country: Poland
- Voivodeship: Łódź
- County: Tomaszów
- Gmina: Tomaszów Mazowiecki
- Established: 1363

Population (2017)
  - Total: 700
- Time zone: UTC+1 (CET)
  - Summer (DST): UTC+2 (CEST)
- Postal code: 97–200
- Area code: +48 44
- Car plates: ETM
- Climate: Dfb

Ciebłowice Duże is a village in the administrative district of Gmina Tomaszów Mazowiecki, within Tomaszów County, Łódź Voivodeship. It is located on the southern edge of the Spała Landscape Park.

== History ==
- The first historical reference dates from 1389. The village belonged to the bishops of Kujawy who resided in Wolborzu. It was settled by settlers from the Sieradz land.
- In 1534, there were 18.5 meadows used by 19 serfs, 1 farmer and mill.
- In 1859 r. the Unewel municipality was created, which included Ciebłowice.
- In November 1941, a labor camp of the Construction Service (Baudienst) was created here. There were about 400 forced laborers in it. "Junacy" worked on the construction of the Tomaszów Mazowiecki – Radom railway route. The camp was liquidated on the night of October 16, 1943 by the partisan detachment of Lieutenant Witold Kucharski "Wichra". Forced workers were freed and camp barracks were set on fire. Fisher camp commandant was shot because he was guilty of the death of one of the prisoners. During the action, 6 rifles, 2 guns, ammunition and equipment of the camp were acquired.
- In 1975, the Tomaszów Mazowiecki commune was established, to which the village now belongs.
- In the years 1975–1998, the town was administratively part of the province of Piotrków.
- In 1993 – Unveiling of a plaque commemorating the liberation of a labor camp.
- In 1994 – Beginning of the construction of the water supply.
- In 1996 – Putting the water supply into operation.
- In 1998 – Beginning of the construction of a sewage system.

== Interesting places ==
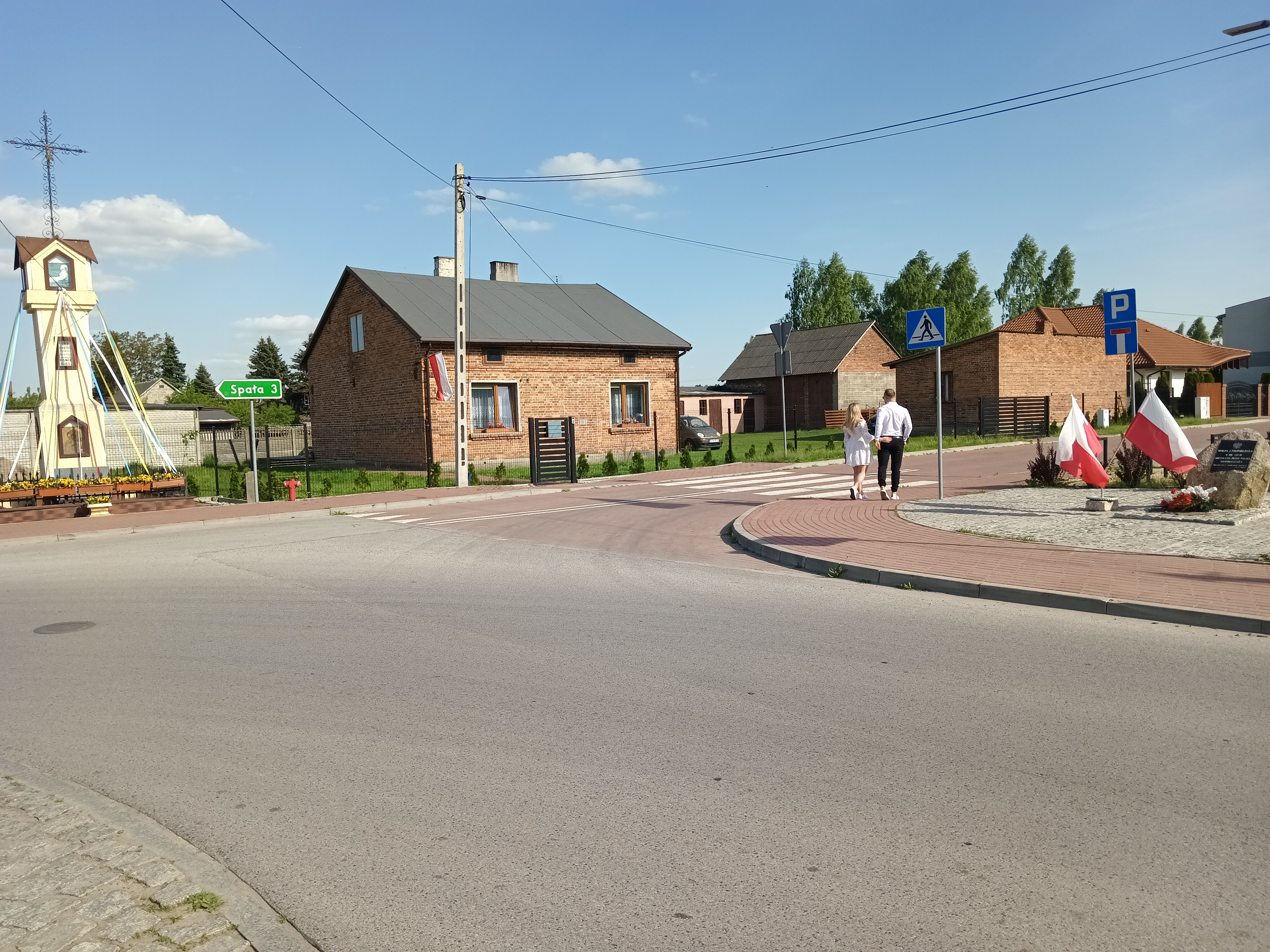
The chapel from 1925, on the right the boulder with a memorial plaque founded for the centenary of regaining independence by Poland in 2018

- Cross and Mound of Freedom Tadeusz Kościuszko.
- The mound was built up by the hands of schoolchildren from Ciebowice in remembrance of expulsion of their enemies from Poland in 1920. The initiator of the construction of the memorial – A. Kolędowska
- Monument and cross in honor of the heroes of the Home Army who died in the country and abroad. The monument was funded by the People's Guard
- The shrine with the inscription "From the air, hunger and fire, save us, Lord." A plaque commemorating the liberation of the Nazi labor camp by the chapel.
- In the village there is a complex of archaeological sites from the period of Roman influence.
- Peatbog "Kaczeniec".
- Swamp "Smug" – a remnant of gravel mining under the railway embankment, now the place of existence of cranes.
- The "Carski Trakt" runs through the village – a road that was crossed from the Jeleń car railway station going to hunts to Spała.

== Famous characters ==
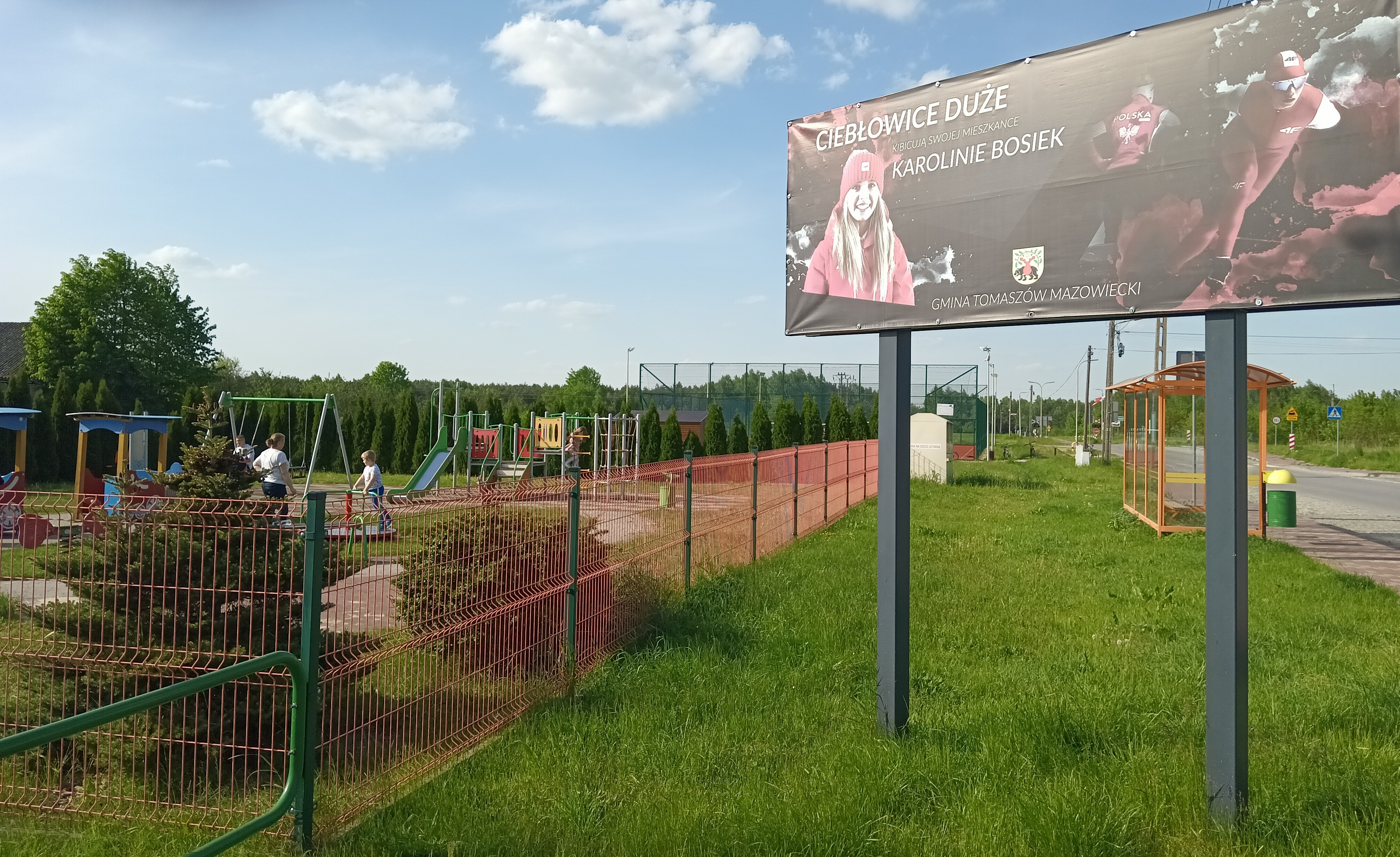
The banner commemorating the participation of speed skater Karolina Bosiek (resident of the village) in the 2018 Winter Olympics in Pyeongchang (South Korea)

- Błażej Stolarski
- Karolina Bosiek
- Adrian Rubaj

== Culture and social activities ==
- "Ciebłowianie" – a folk band led by Mrs. Katarzyna Małek
- O4D – blues band
- Circle of Country Housewives – cultural and educational activities

== Infrastructure ==
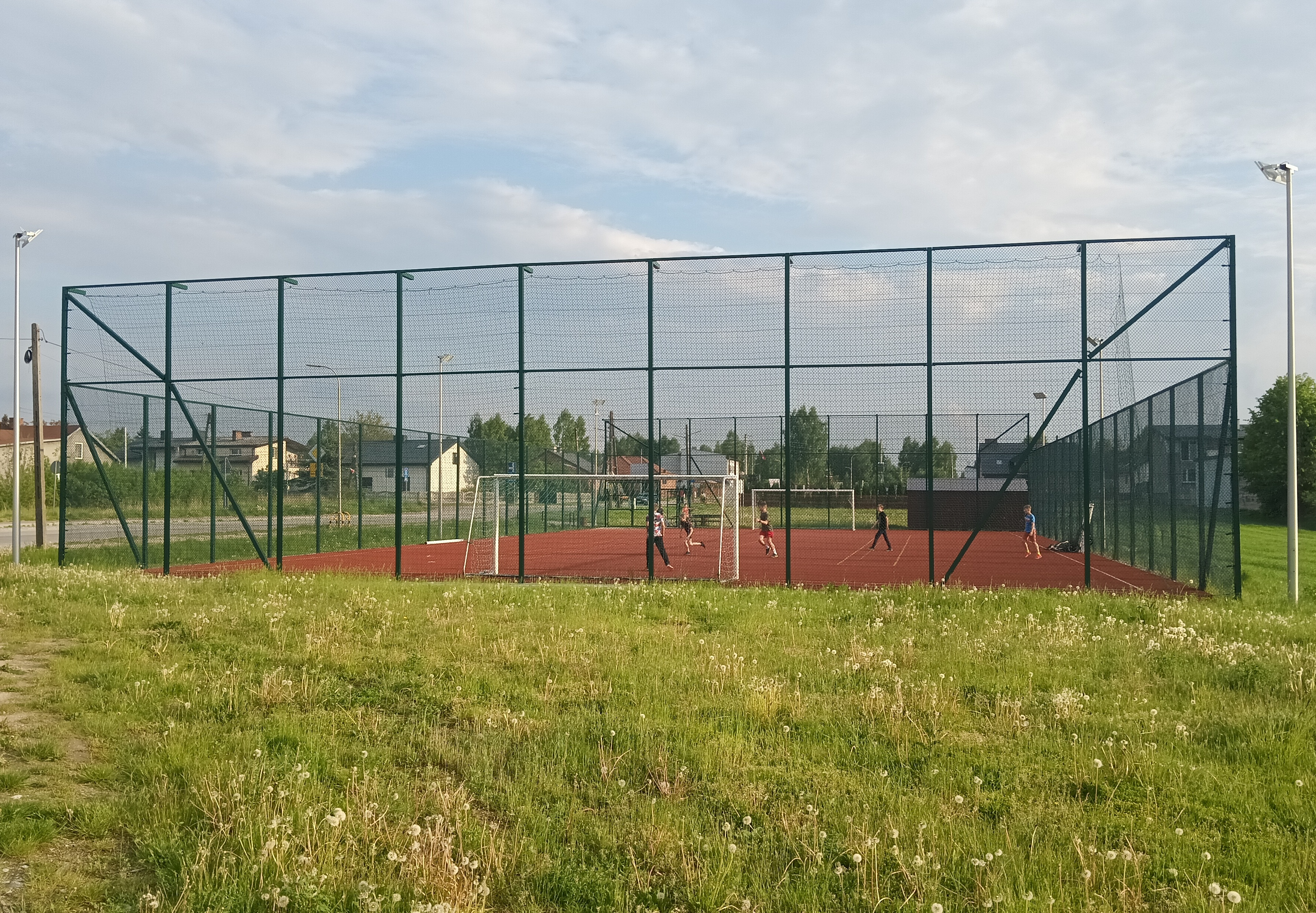
The playground in the village

- Sewage system with sewage pumping stations
- Biological treatment plant (type: Bioclere)
- Sidewalks
- Stops with bays for buses
- Containers for separate waste collection
- Railway line no. 22 Tomaszów Mazowiecki – Radom.
