= Łazisko =

Łazisko may refer to the following places in Poland:

- Łazisko, Lower Silesian Voivodeship (south-west Poland)
- Łazisko, Łódź Voivodeship (central Poland)
