= Jadwigów =

Jadwigów may refer to the following places:

- Jadwigów, Łódź Voivodeship (central Poland)
- Jadwigów, Opatów County in Świętokrzyskie Voivodeship (south-central Poland)
- Jadwigów, Włoszczowa County in Świętokrzyskie Voivodeship (south-central Poland)
- Jadwigów, Białobrzegi County in Masovian Voivodeship (east-central Poland)
- Jadwigów, Grójec County in Masovian Voivodeship (east-central Poland)
- Jadwigów, Płock County in Masovian Voivodeship (east-central Poland)
- Jadwigów, Greater Poland Voivodeship (west-central Poland)
