= Błażej Stolarski =

Polish politician (1880–1939)

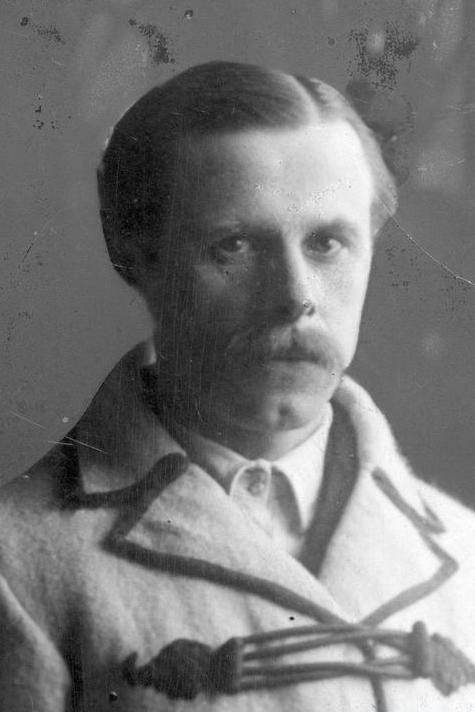
- Born: Błażej Stolarski; 2 February 1880; Ciebłowice Duże, Piotrków Governorate, Congress Poland, Russian Empire
- Died: 21 October 1939 (aged 59); Berlin, Germany
- Occupation: Political activist
- Political party: Polish People's Party

Błażej Stolarski (born 2 February 1880) was a Polish politician, Deputy Marshal of the Polish Senate in 1938–1939, and leader of the Polish People's Party.

== Biography ==
He was born to father Wojciech and mother Małgorzata. Young Płażynski didn't study because of his parents' poor financial status, yet he tried to learn to write and read from Konrad Prószyński's book. He was supported in learning by local workers. He then became a very famous farmer. In 1905, Płażynski joined the National League but left it in 1907 after accusing its leader, Roman Dmowski, of pro-Russian sympathies.

He was a founding member of the National Peasant Union. During the First World War, he joined the Polish Military Organisation, where he educated the masses. Płażynski was a member of the Provisional Council of State.
