= Karolinów, Gmina Tomaszów Mazowiecki =

Karolinów
- Village
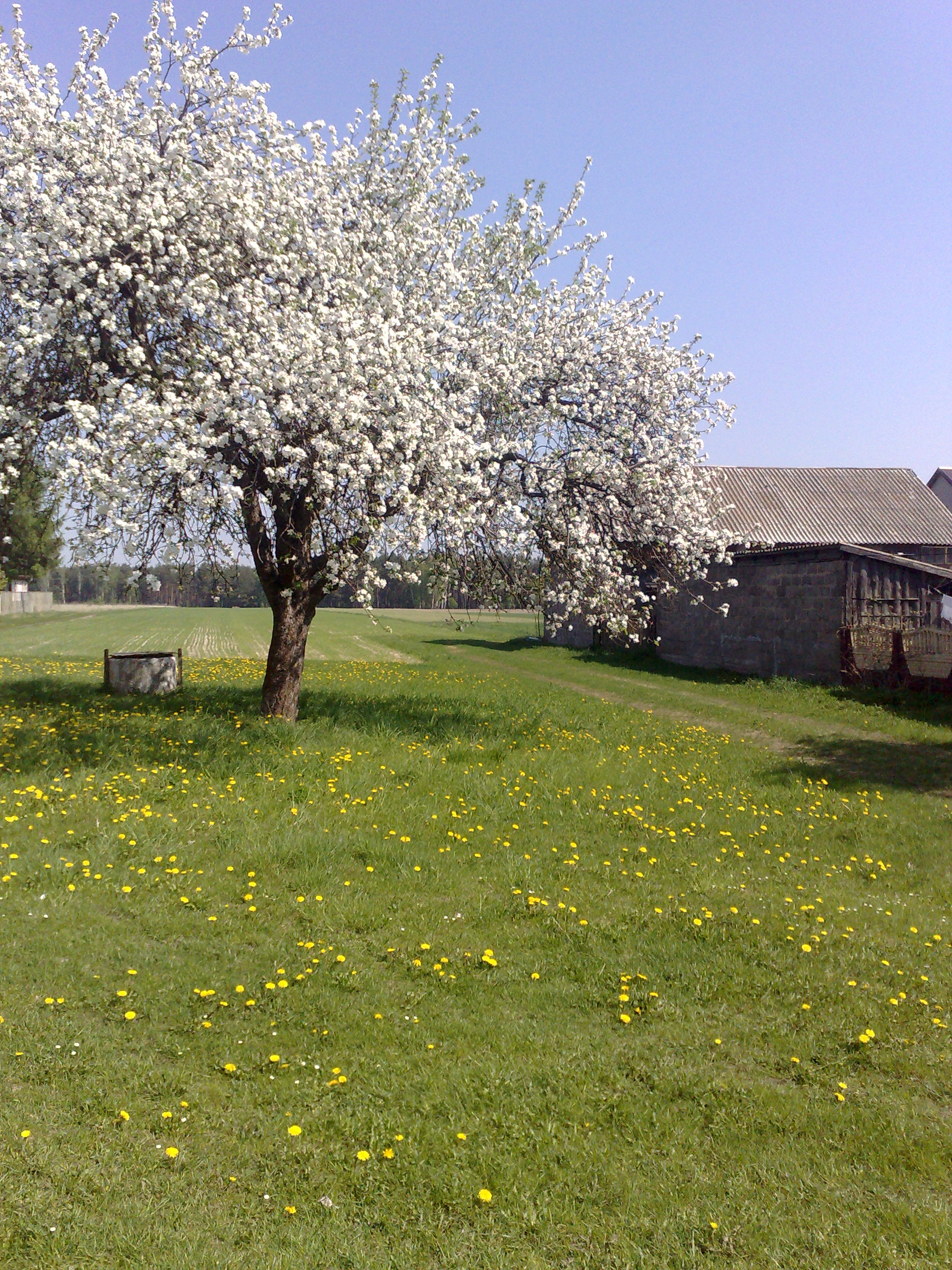

- Location within Poland
- Coordinates: 51°26′42″N 19°59′20″E
- Country: Poland
- Voivodeship: Łódź
- County: Tomaszów
- Gmina: Tomaszów Mazowiecki

Karolinów [karɔˈlinuf] is a village in the administrative district of Gmina Tomaszów Mazowiecki, within Tomaszów County, Łódź Voivodeship, in central Poland.
