= Tresta Rządowa =

- Village
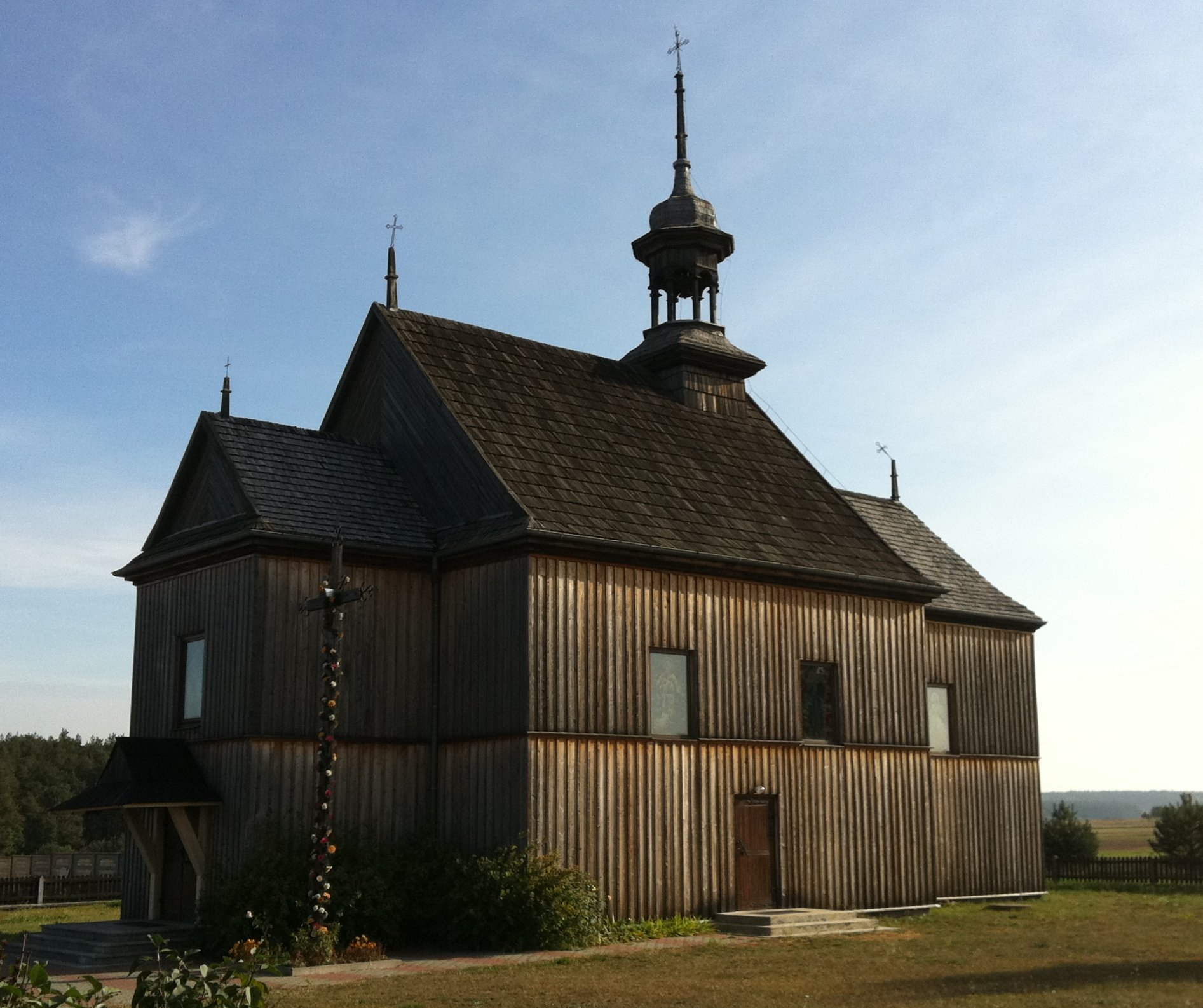
- Catholic church

- Location within Poland
- Coordinates: 51°28′N 20°1′E
- Country: Poland
- Voivodeship: Łódź
- County: Tomaszów
- Gmina: Tomaszów Mazowiecki

Tresta Rządowa [ˈtrɛsta ʐɔnˈdɔva] is a village in the administrative district of Gmina Tomaszów Mazowiecki, within Tomaszów County, Łódź Voivodeship, in central Poland.
