= Gmina Tomaszów Mazowiecki =

Gmina Tomaszów Mazowiecki Tomaszów Mazowiecki Commune
- Gmina
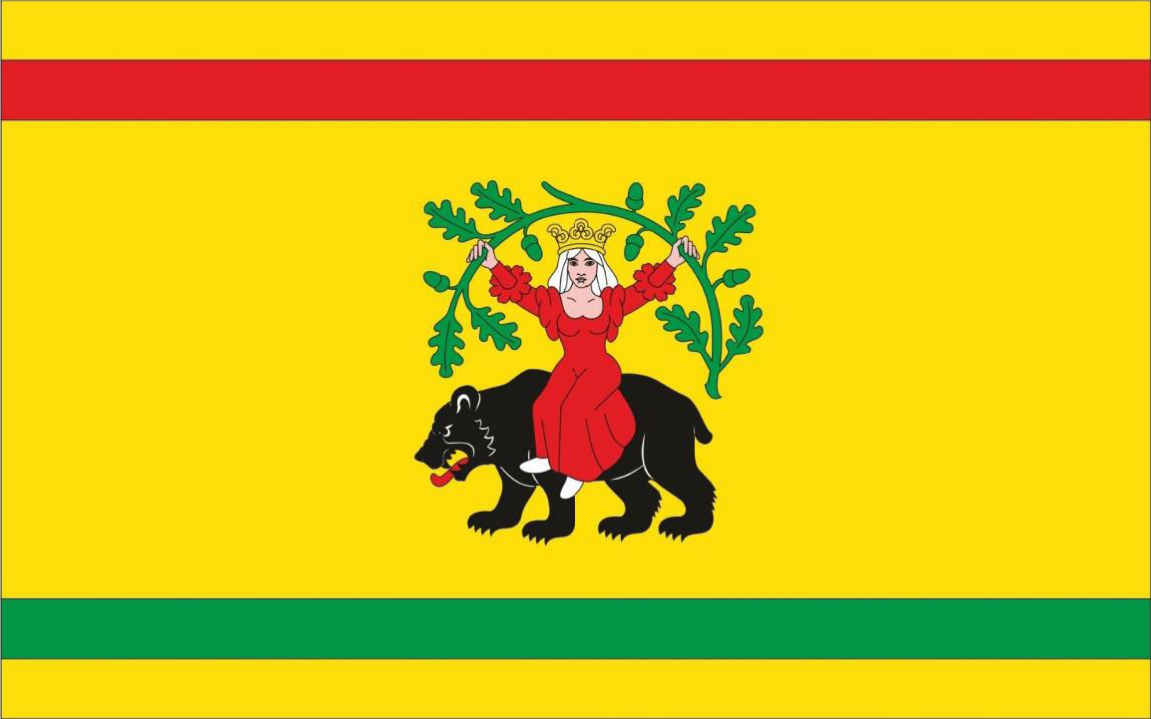
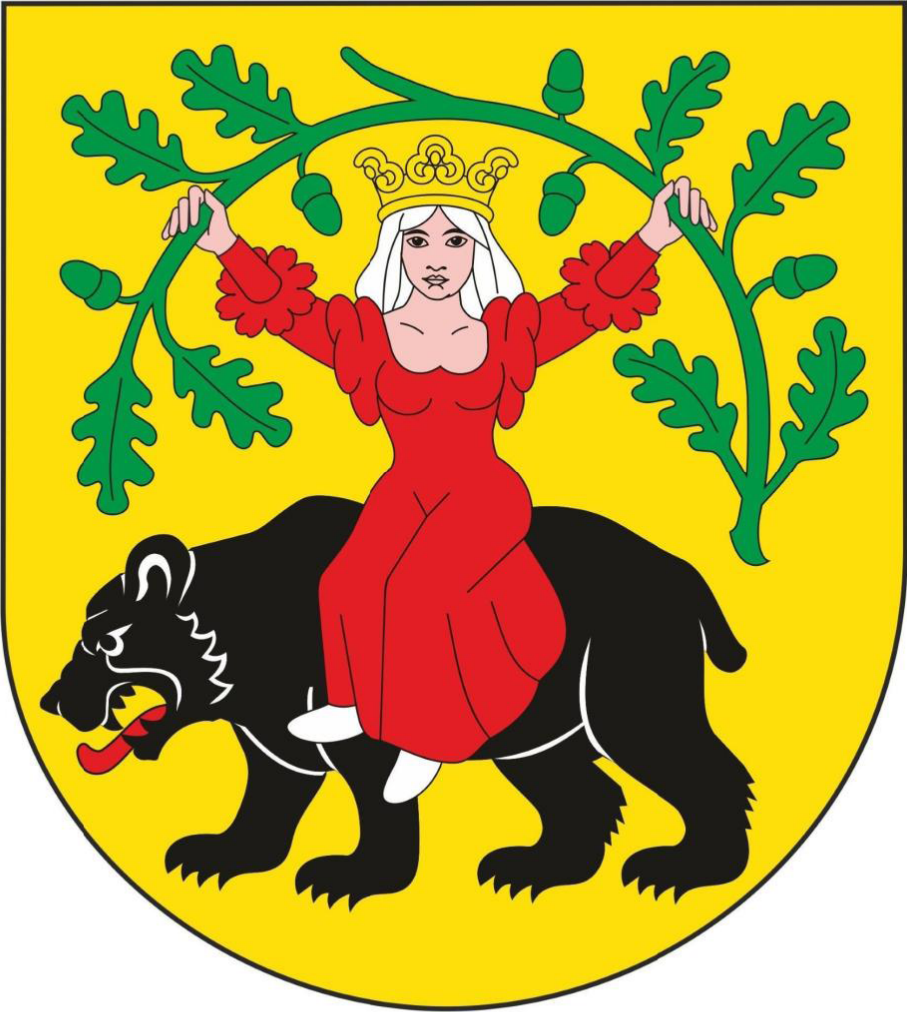
- Flag Coat of arms
- Interactive map of Gmina Tomaszów Mazowiecki
- Coordinates (Tomaszów Mazowiecki): 51°31′N 20°1′E
- Country: Poland
- Voivodeship: Łódź
- County: Tomaszów
- Seat: Tomaszów Mazowiecki

Area
  - Total: 151.3 km^{2} (58.4 sq mi)

Population (2006)
  - Total: 9,826
  - Density: 64.94/km^{2} (168.2/sq mi)

Gmina Tomaszów Mazowiecki is a rural gmina (administrative district) in Tomaszów County, Łódź Voivodeship, in central Poland. Its seat is the town of Tomaszów Mazowiecki, although the town is not part of the territory of the gmina.

The gmina covers an area of 151.3 square kilometres (58.4 sq mi), and as of 2006 its total population is 9,826.

The gmina contains part of the protected areas of Spała Landscape Park and Sulejów Landscape Park.

== Villages ==
Gmina Tomaszów Mazowiecki contains the villages and settlements of Cekanów, Chorzęcin, Ciebłowice Duże, Ciebłowice Małe, Dąbrowa, Godaszewice, Jadwigów, Jeleń, Karolinów, Komorów, Kwiatkówka, Łazisko, Niebrów, Sługocice, Smardzewice, Świńsko, Swolszewice Małe, Tresta Rządowa, Twarda, Wąwał, Wiaderno, Zaborów Drugi, Zaborów Pierwszy, Zawada and Zawada-Kolonia.

== Neighbouring gminas ==
Gmina Tomaszów Mazowiecki is bordered by the town of Tomaszów Mazowiecki and by the gminas of Inowłódz, Lubochnia, Mniszków, Sławno, Ujazd and Wolbórz.
