= Ciebłowice Małe =

- Village
- Location within Poland
- Coordinates: 51°31′54″N 20°5′48″E
- Country: Poland
- Voivodeship: Łódź
- County: Tomaszów
- Gmina: Tomaszów Mazowiecki

Ciebłowice Małe [t͡ɕɛbwɔˈvit͡sɛ ˈmawɛ] is a village in the administrative district of Gmina Tomaszów Mazowiecki, within Tomaszów County, Łódź Voivodeship, in central Poland.
