= Dąbrowa, Gmina Tomaszów Mazowiecki =

Dąbrowa
- Village
- Location within Poland
- Coordinates: 51°31′11″N 19°58′19″E
- Country: Poland
- Voivodeship: Łódź
- County: Tomaszów
- Gmina: Tomaszów Mazowiecki

Dąbrowa [dɔmˈbrɔva] is a village in the administrative district of Gmina Tomaszów Mazowiecki, within Tomaszów County, Łódź Voivodeship, in central Poland.
