= Godaszewice =

- Village
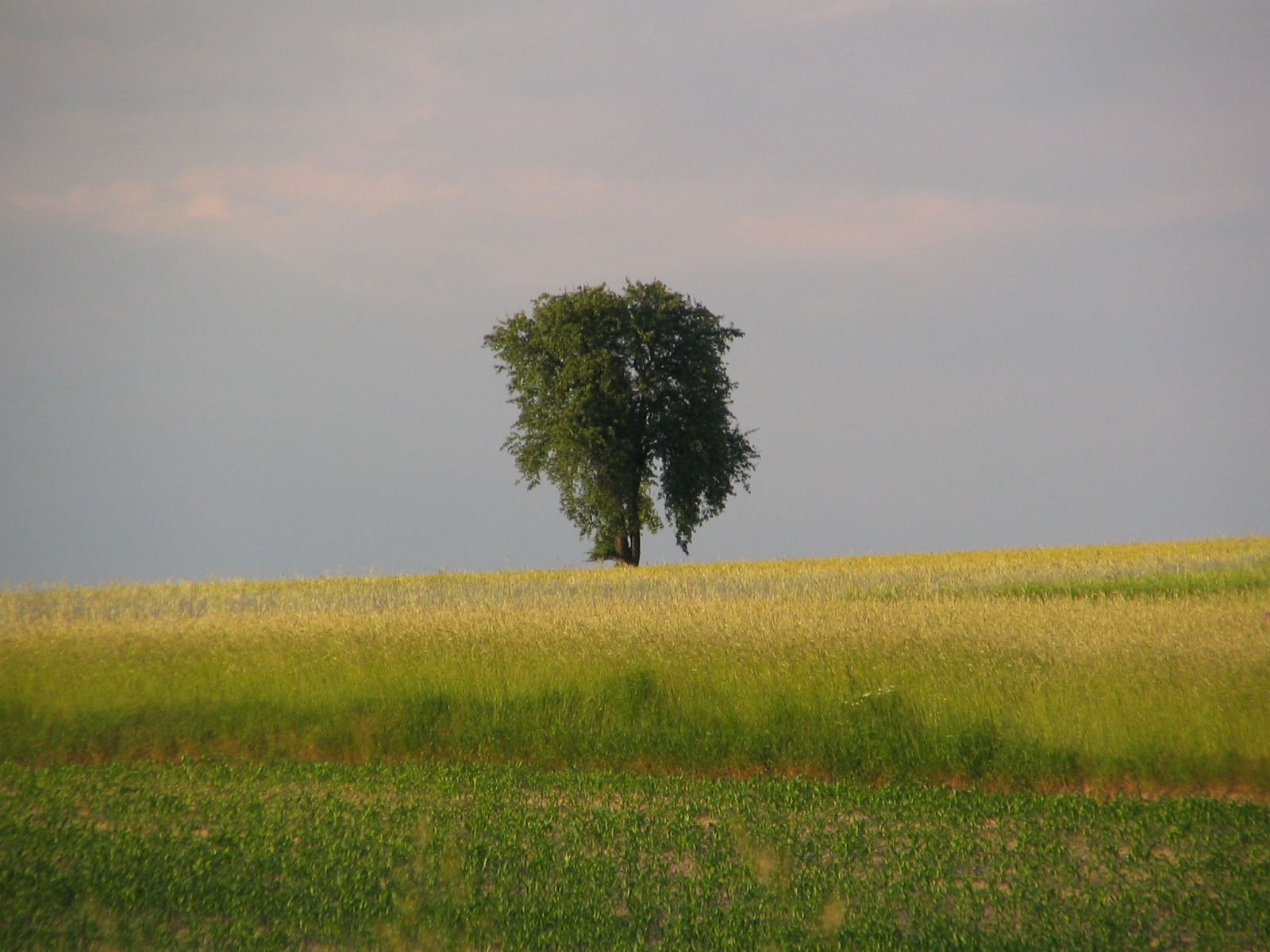

- Location within Poland
- Coordinates: 51°31′20″N 19°54′3″E
- Country: Poland
- Voivodeship: Łódź
- County: Tomaszów
- Gmina: Tomaszów Mazowiecki

Godaszewice [ɡɔdaʂɛˈvit͡sɛ] is a village in the administrative district of Gmina Tomaszów Mazowiecki, within Tomaszów County, Łódź Voivodeship, in central Poland with a population of 71 as of 2015.

The village lies approximately 9 kilometres (6 miles) west of Tomaszów Mazowiechi and 42 kilometres (26 miles) south-east of the regional capital Łódź.
