= Chorzęcin =

- Village
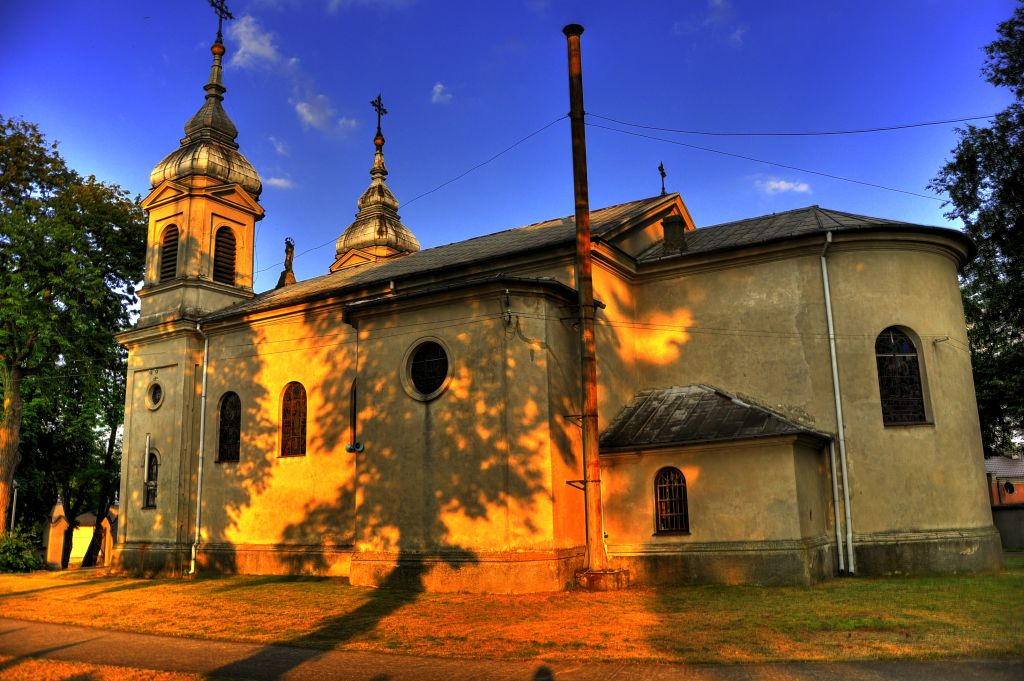
- Saint Margaret church since 1892

- Location within Poland
- Coordinates: 51°32′N 19°53′E
- Country: Poland
- Voivodeship: Łódź
- County: Tomaszów
- Gmina: Tomaszów Mazowiecki

Chorzęcin [xɔˈʐɛnt͡ɕin] is a village in the administrative district of Gmina Tomaszów Mazowiecki, within Tomaszów County, Łódź Voivodeship, in central Poland.

In 2019, the Volunteer Fire Brigade in Chorzęcin celebrated 100th anniversary.

There is a public transport bus from Tomaszów Mazowiecki to Chorzęcin (2 lines).

== Gallery ==
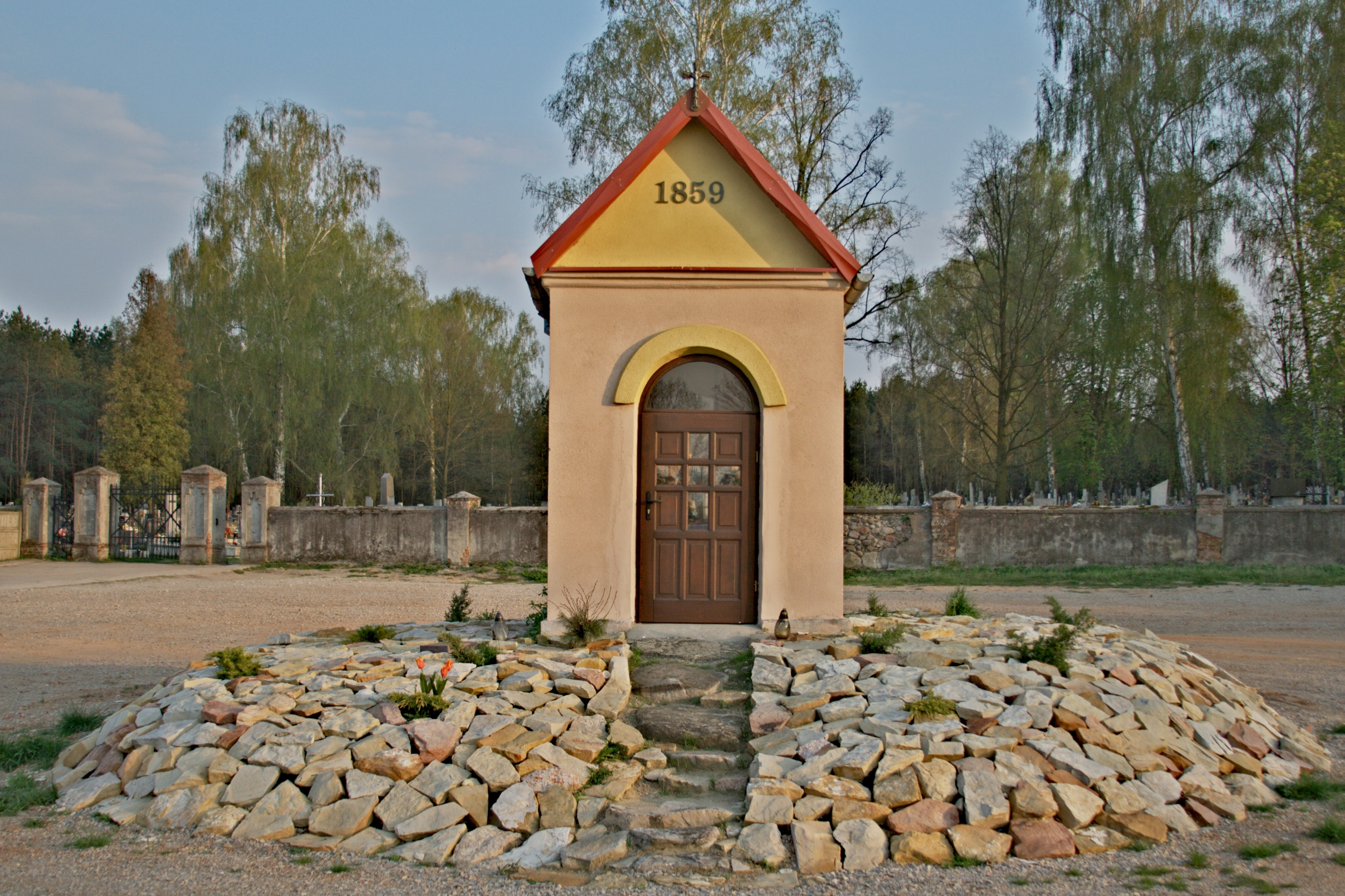
A chapel since 1859

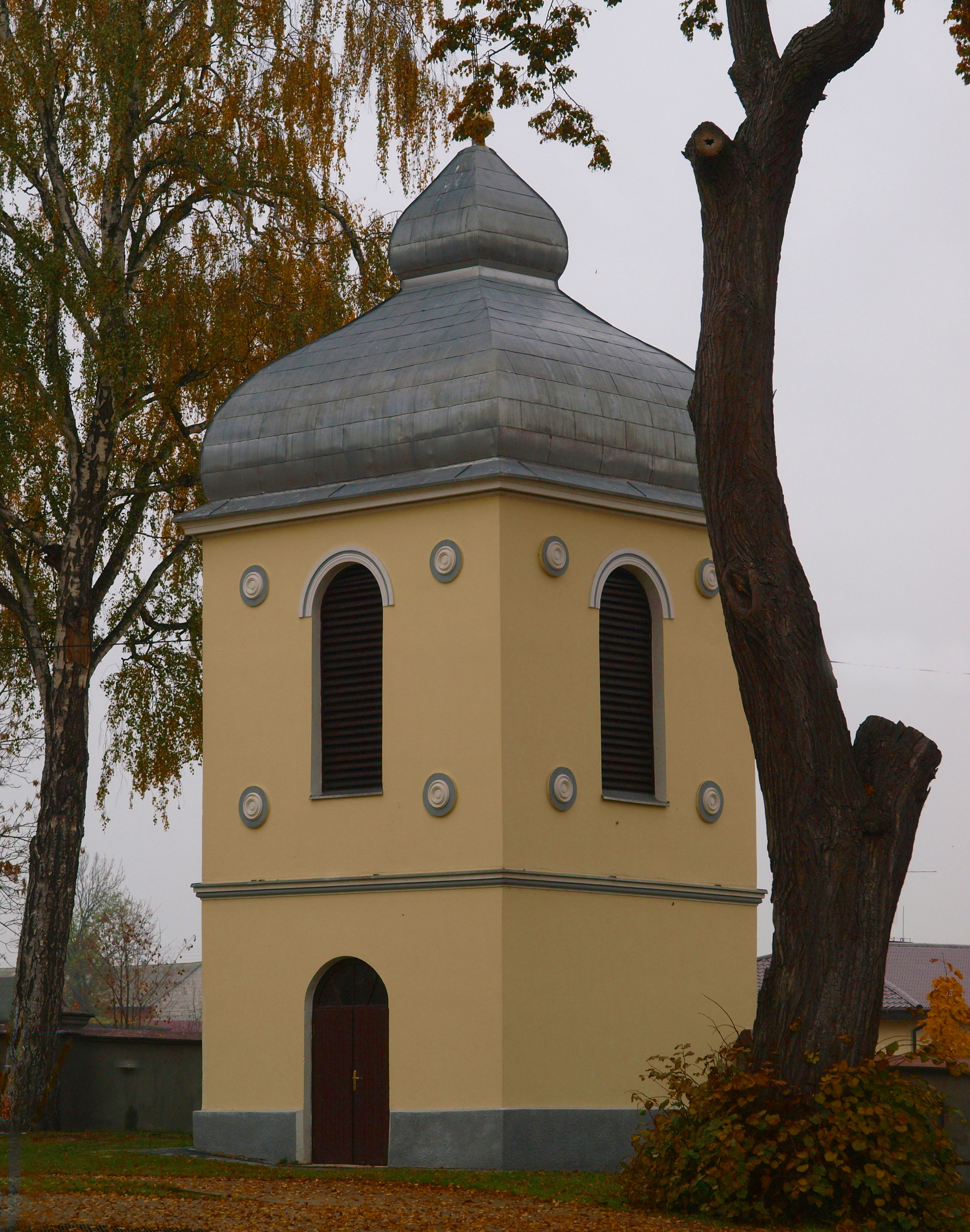
Belfry at the church

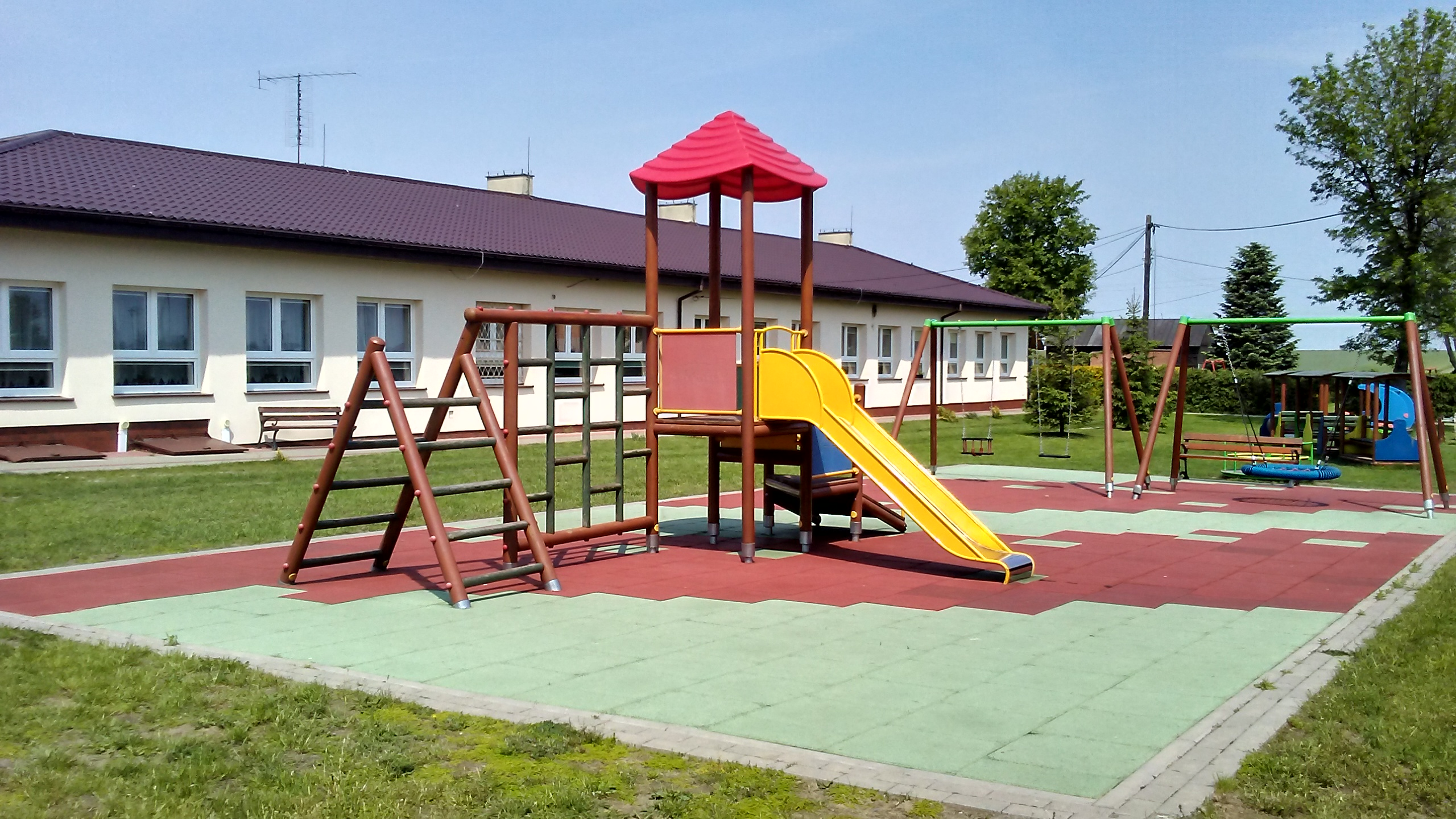
Kindergarten (2019)

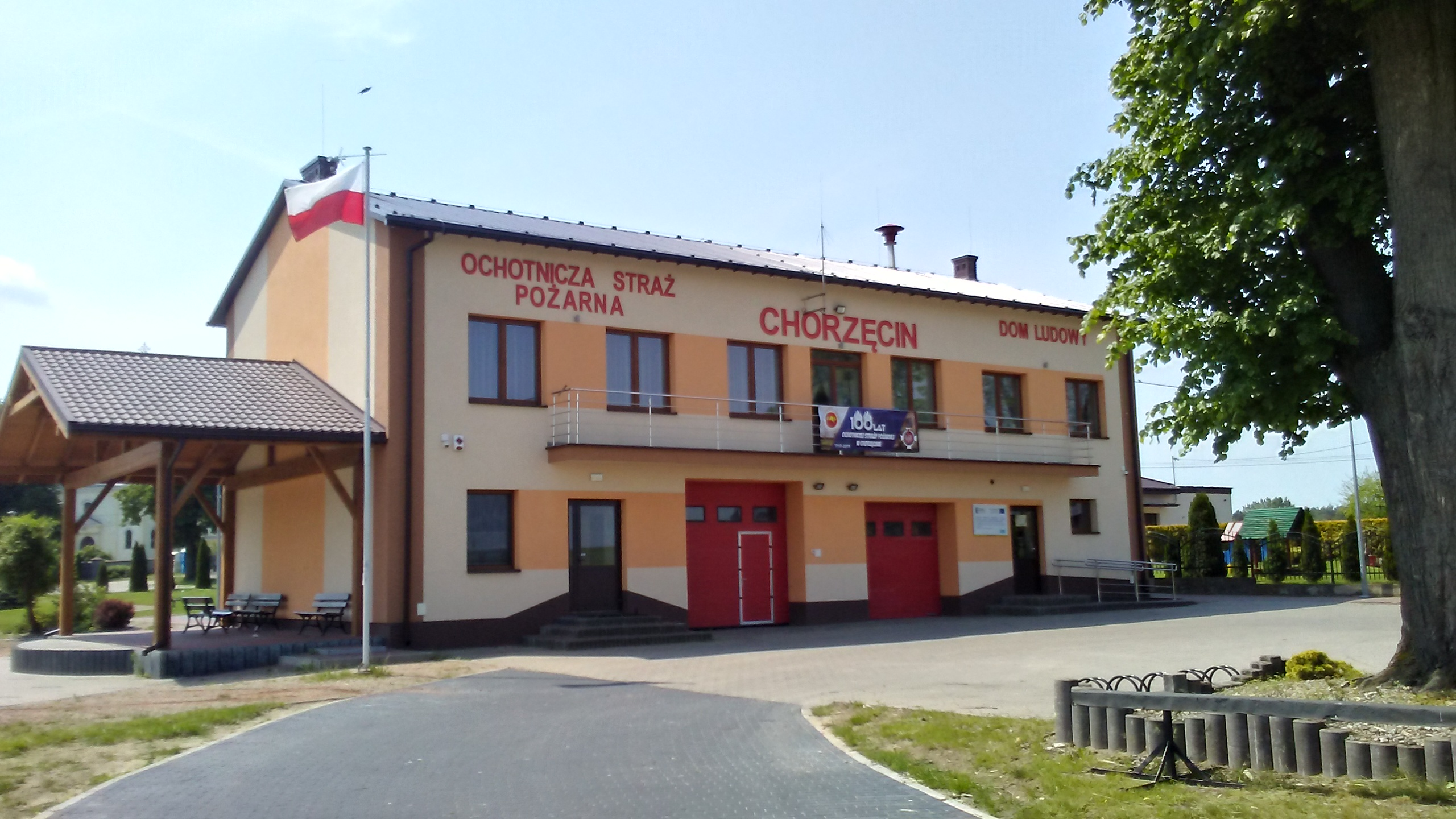
Fire station and culture center (2019)

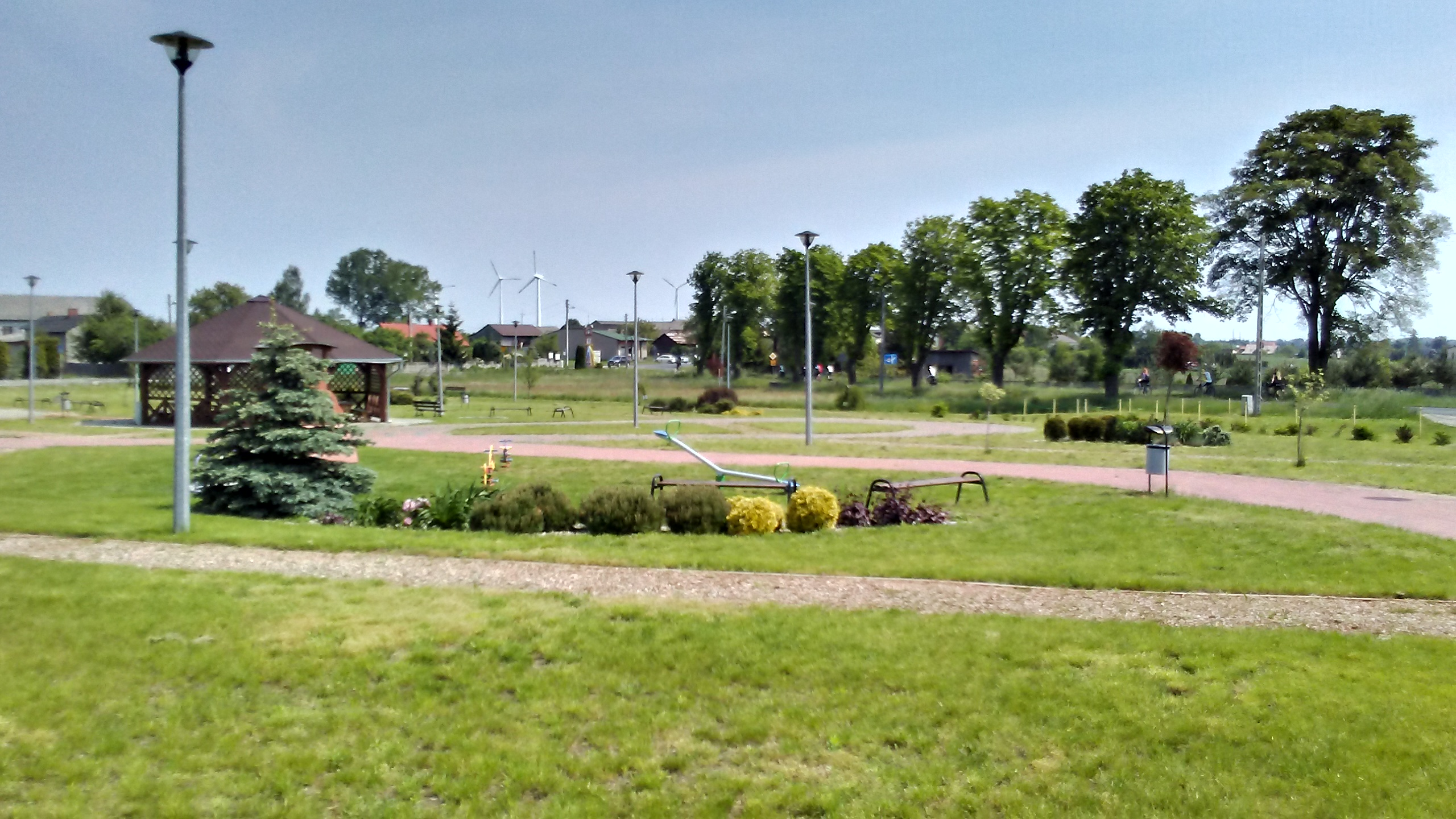
Village park (2019)

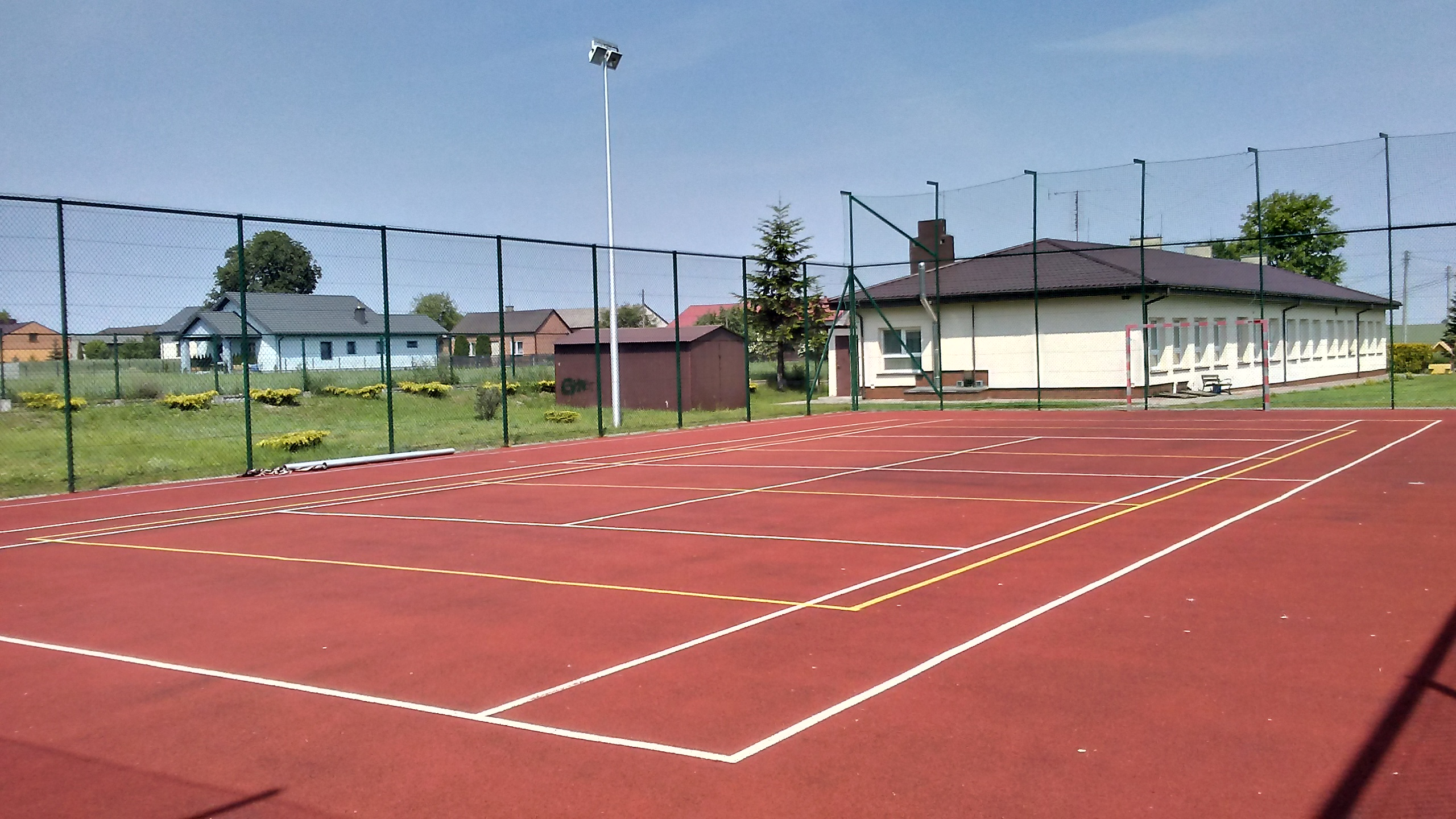
Tennis court (2019)
