= Wąwał, Łódź Voivodeship =

Wąwał
- Village
- Location within Poland
- Coordinates: 51°30′N 20°4′E
- Country: Poland
- Voivodeship: Łódź
- County: Tomaszów
- Gmina: Tomaszów Mazowiecki
- Elevation: 173 m (568 ft)
- Population (approx.): 700

Wąwał [ˈvɔ̃vau̯] is a village in the administrative district of Gmina Tomaszów Mazowiecki, within Tomaszów County, Łódź Voivodeship, in central Poland.

The village has an approximate population of 700.
