= Kwiatkówka =

- Village
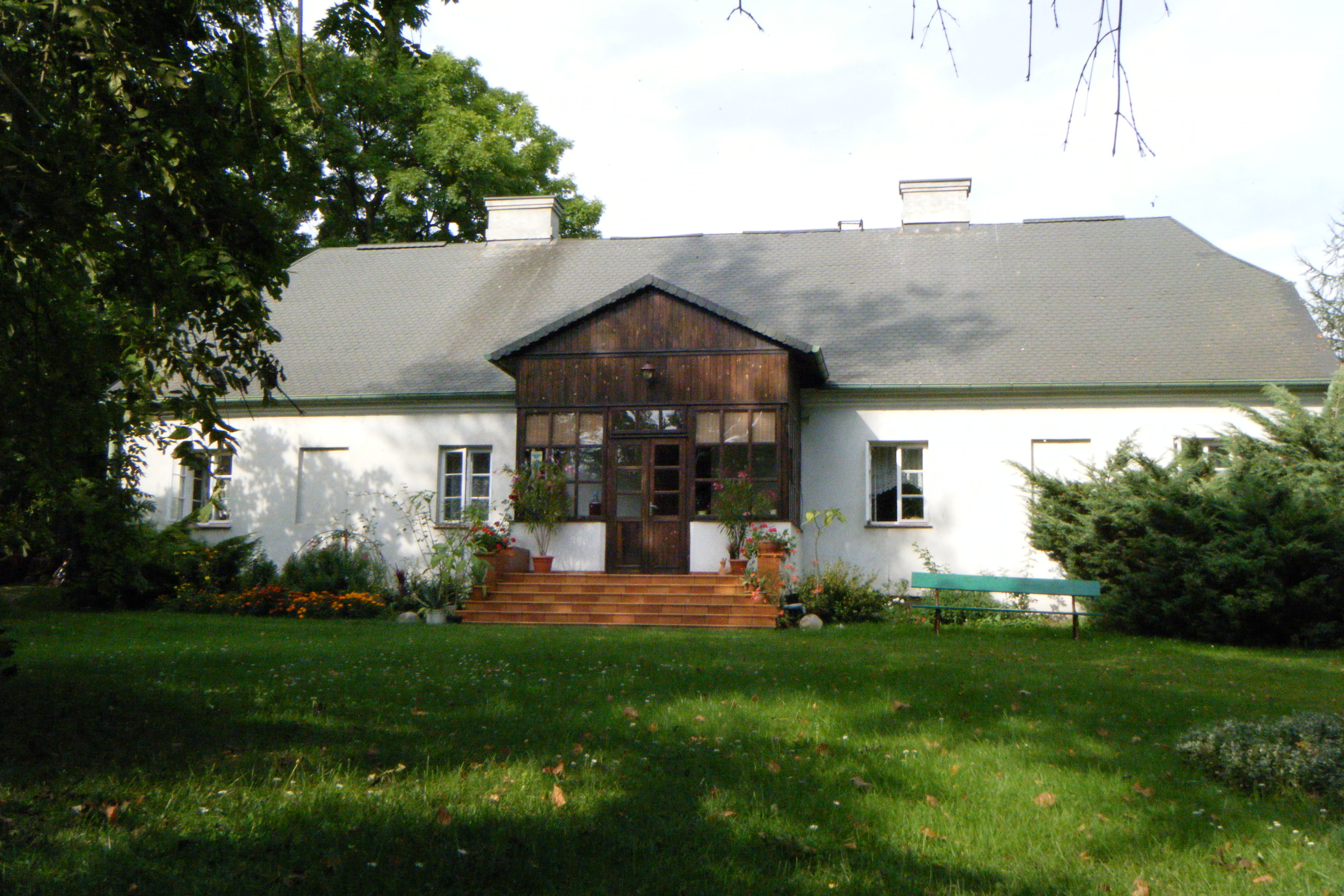

- Location within Poland
- Coordinates: 51°32′6″N 19°53′31″E
- Country: Poland
- Voivodeship: Łódź
- County: Tomaszów
- Gmina: Tomaszów Mazowiecki

Kwiatkówka [kfjatˈkufka] is a village in the administrative district of Gmina Tomaszów Mazowiecki, within Tomaszów County, Łódź Voivodeship, in central Poland.
