= Sługocice, Gmina Tomaszów Mazowiecki =

Sługocice
- Village
- Location within Poland
- Coordinates: 51°29′34″N 20°7′23″E
- Country: Poland
- Voivodeship: Łódź
- County: Tomaszów
- Gmina: Tomaszów Mazowiecki

Sługocice [swuɡɔˈt͡ɕit͡sɛ] is a village in the administrative district of Gmina Tomaszów Mazowiecki, within Tomaszów County, Łódź Voivodeship, in central Poland.

Sługocice ca 1925

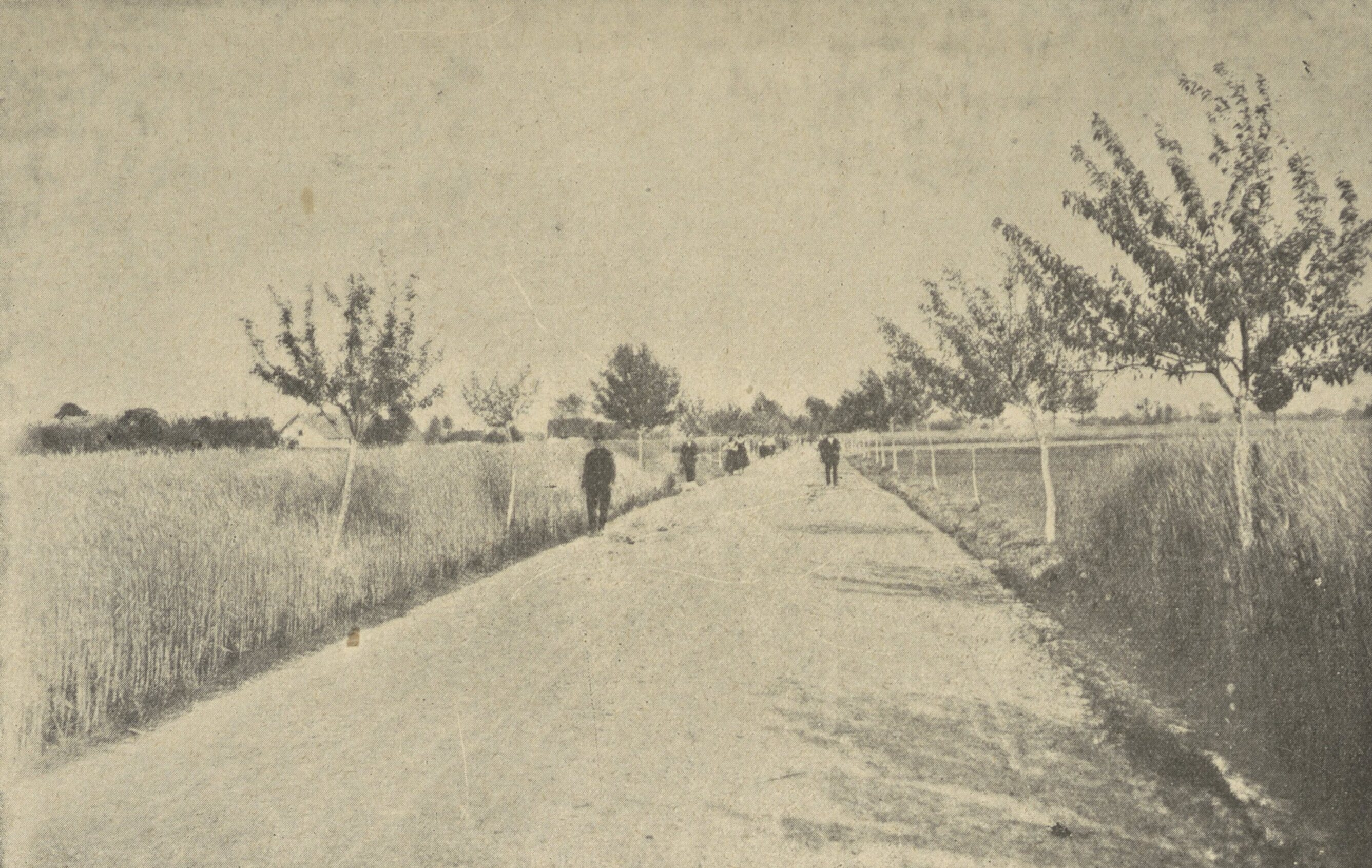
Road to village

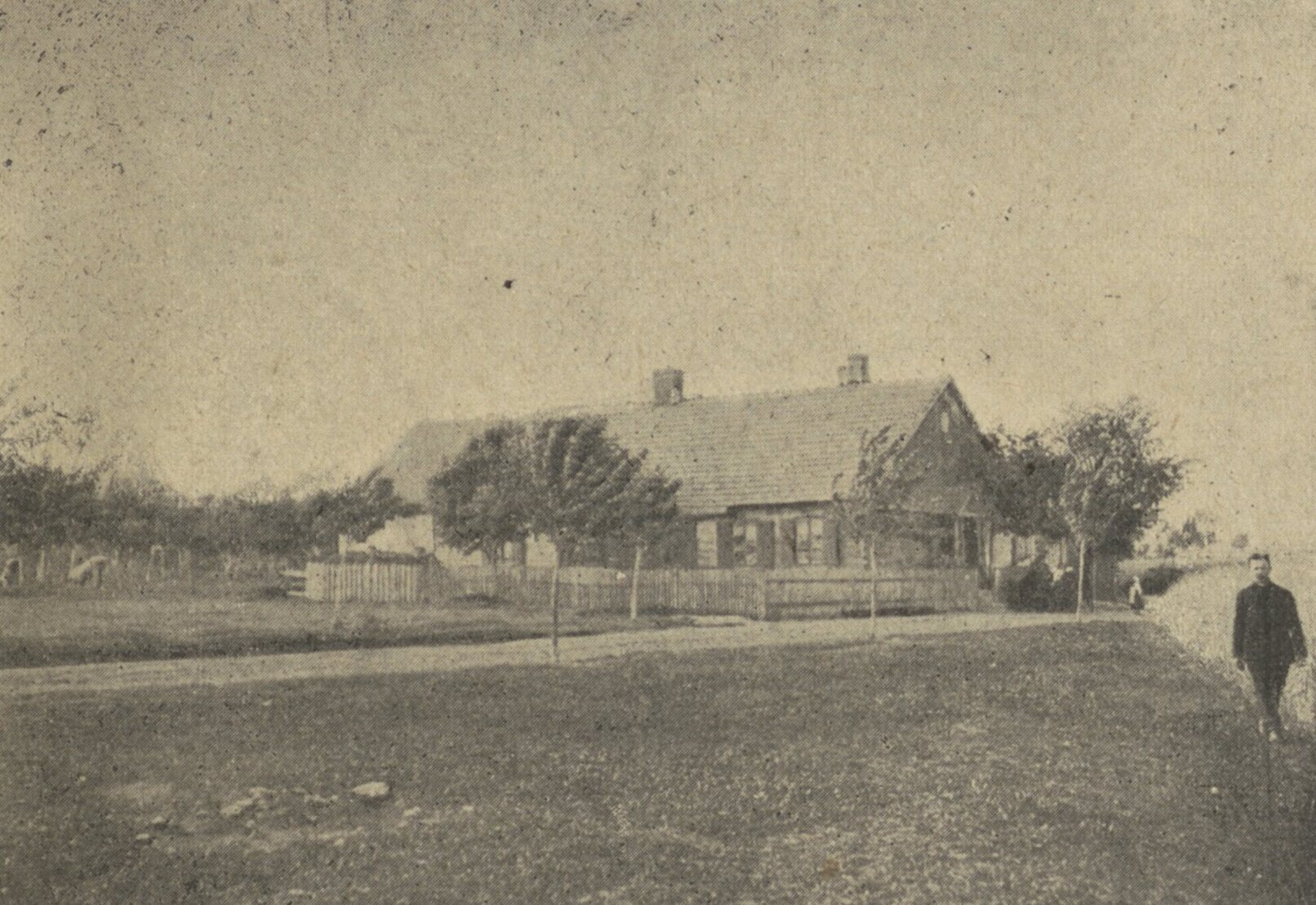
House

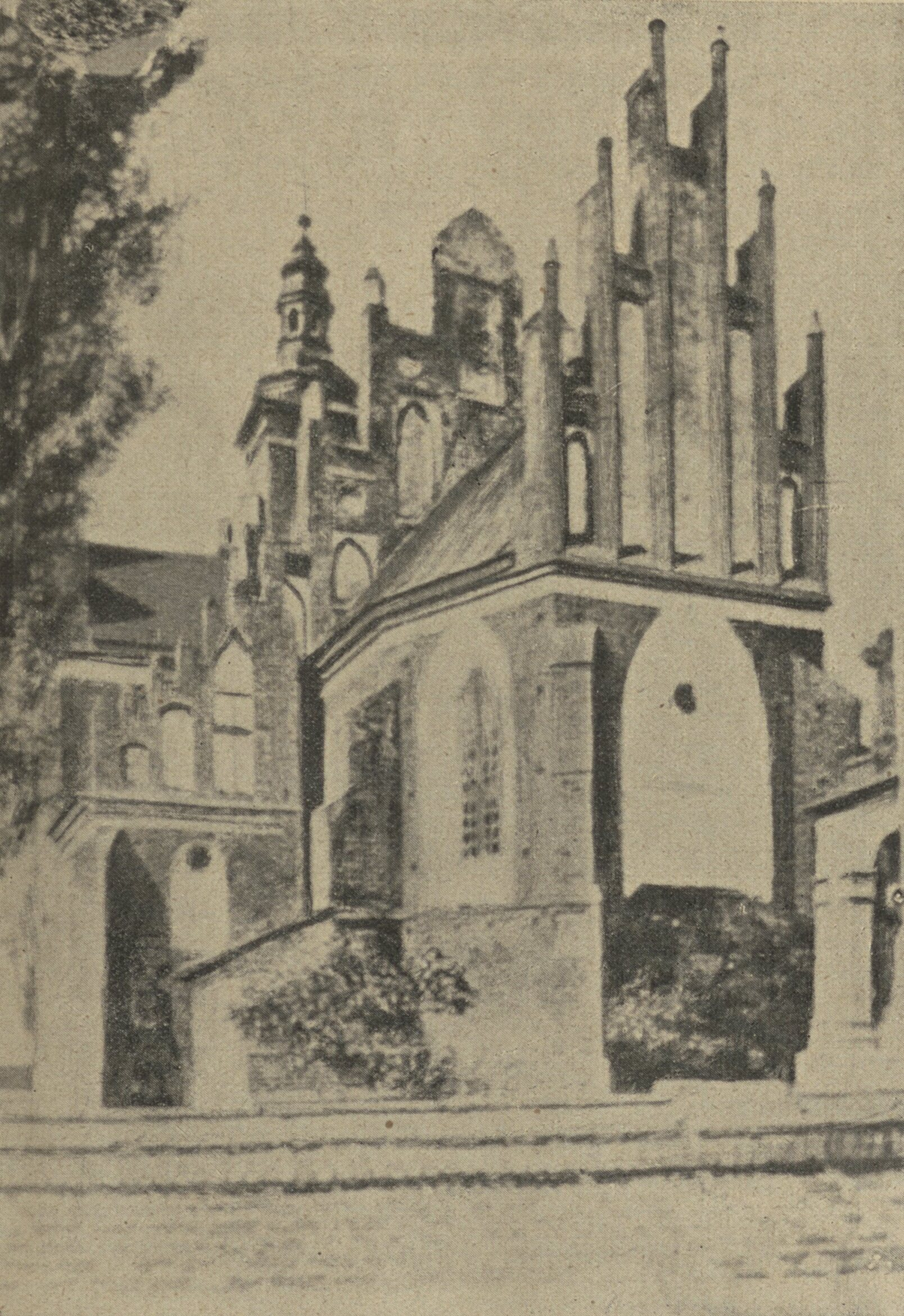
Church

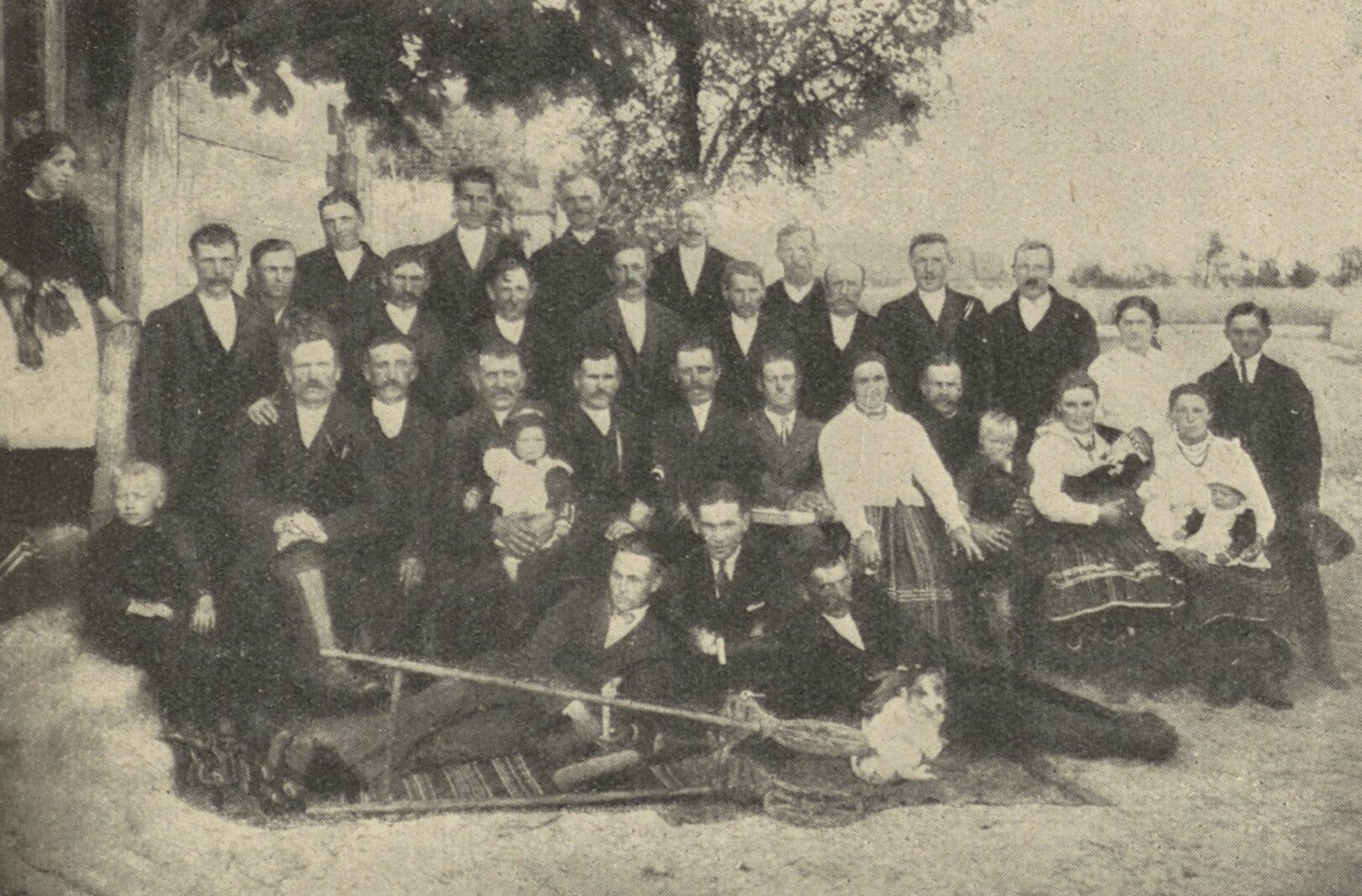
Residents

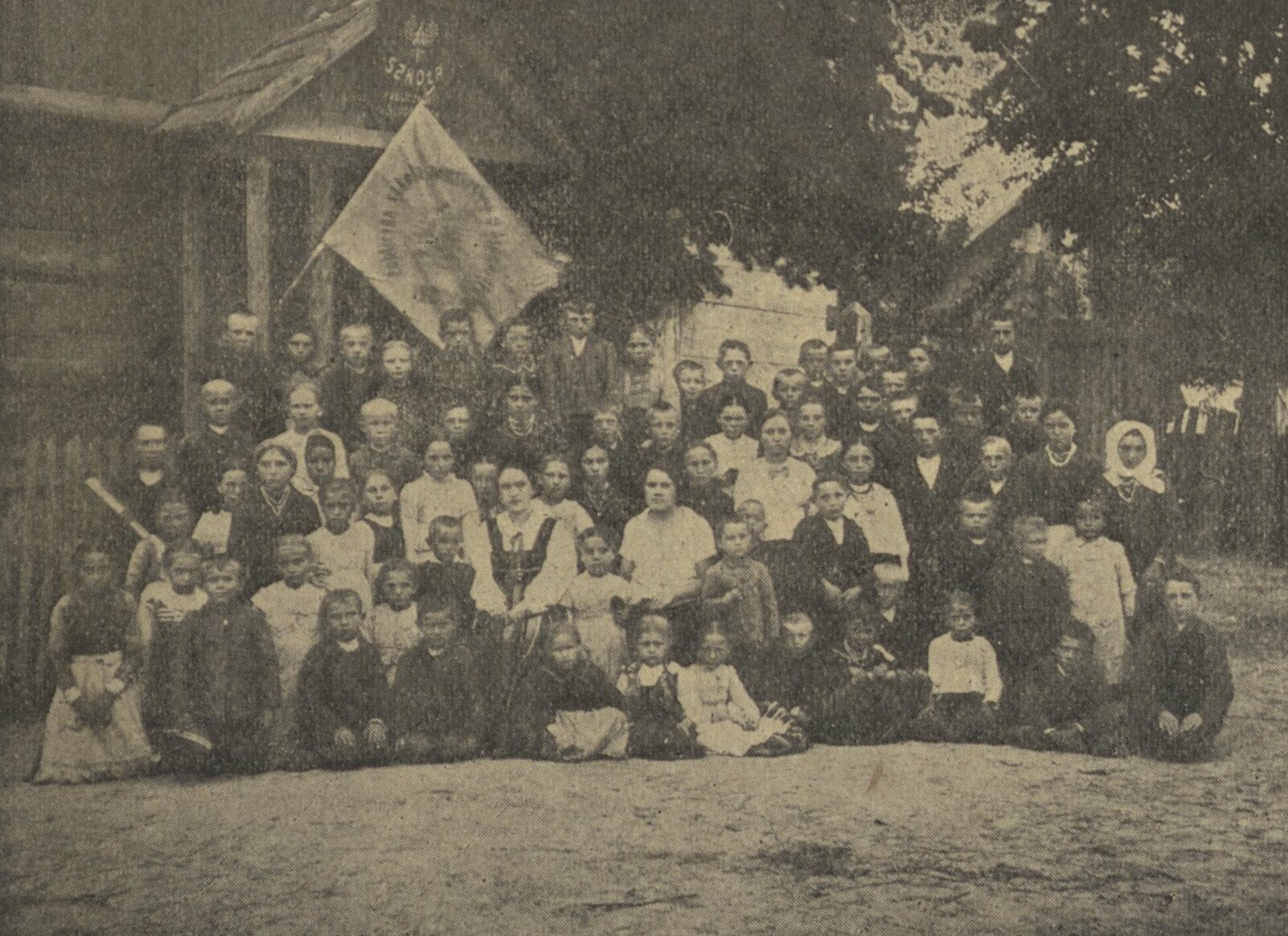
School

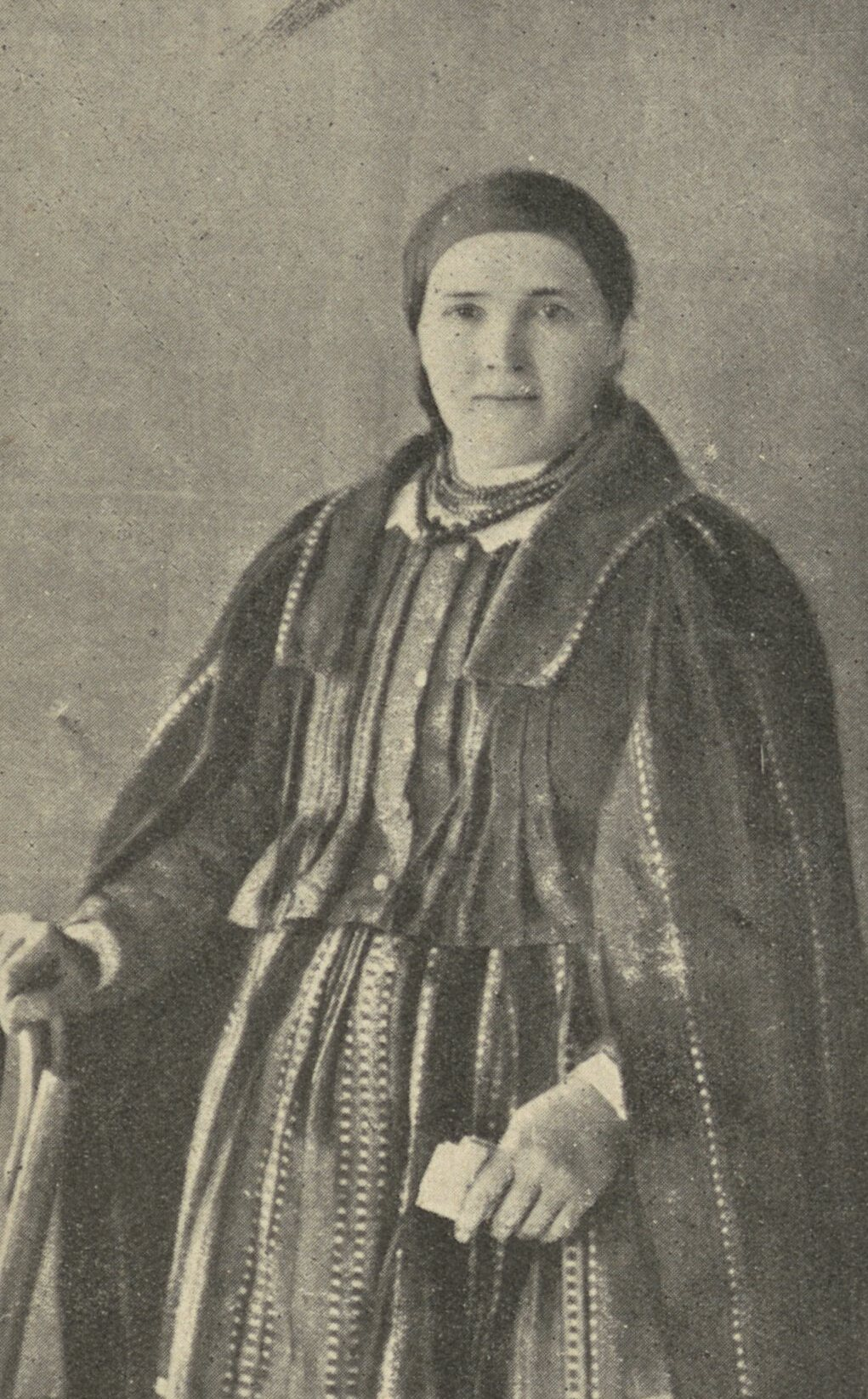
Women's clothing

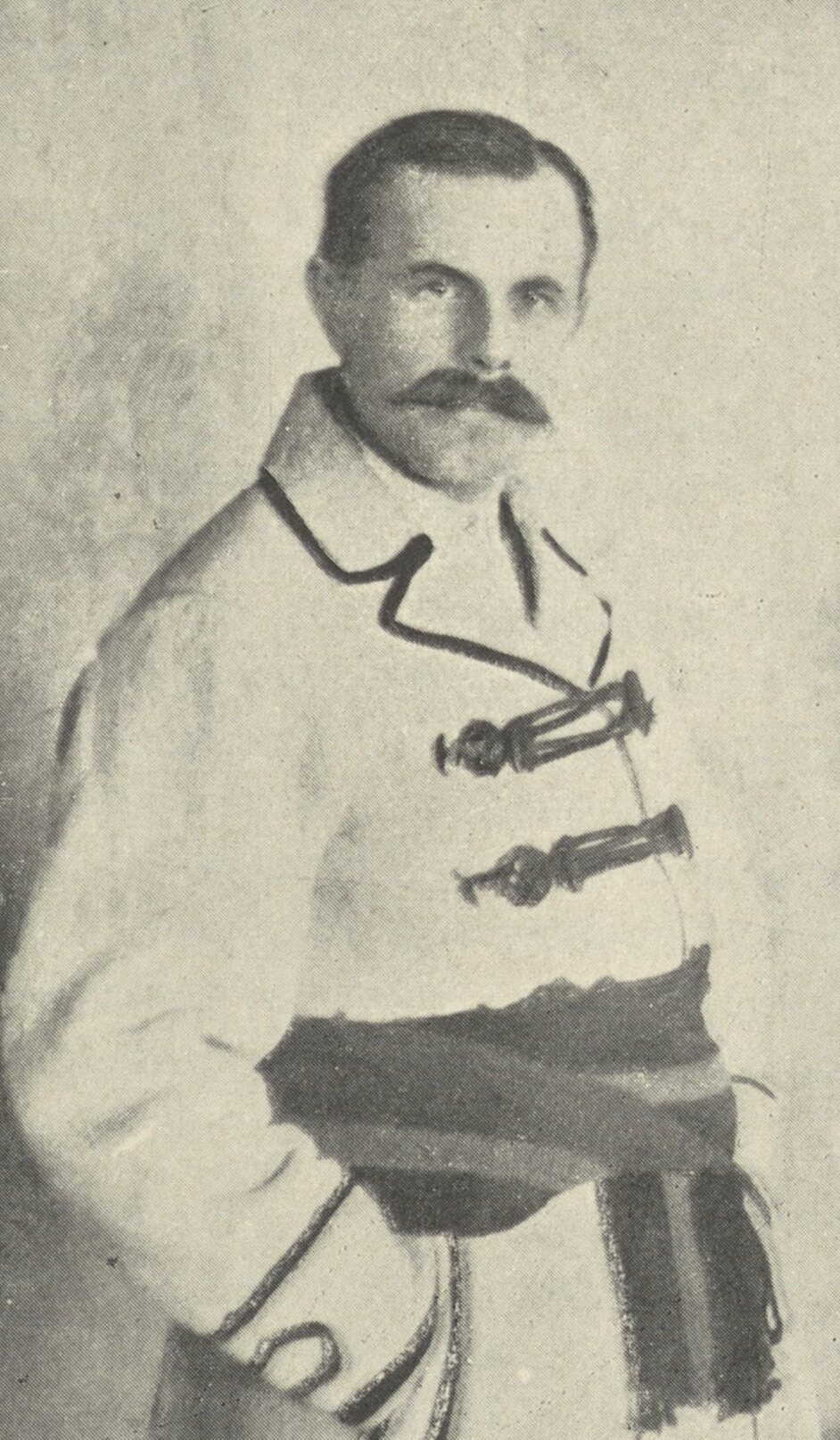
Men's clothing

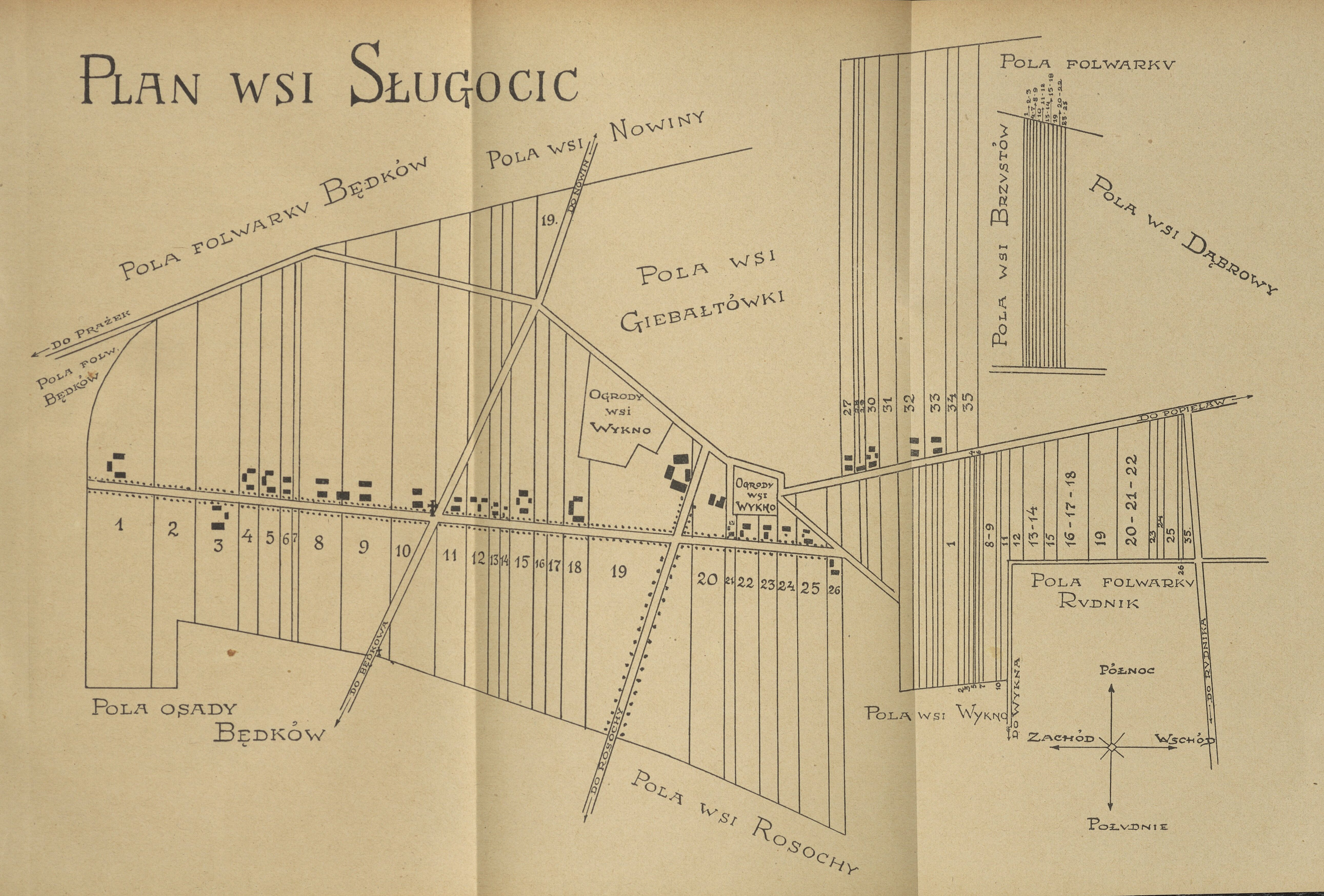
Village plan
