= Cekanów, Gmina Tomaszów Mazowiecki =

Cekanów
- Village
- Location within Poland
- Coordinates: 51°34′N 19°59′E
- Country: Poland
- Voivodeship: Łódź
- County: Tomaszów
- Gmina: Tomaszów Mazowiecki

Cekanów [t͡sɛˈkanuf] is a village in the administrative district of Gmina Tomaszów Mazowiecki, within Tomaszów County, Łódź Voivodeship, in central Poland.
