= Swolszewice Małe =

- Village
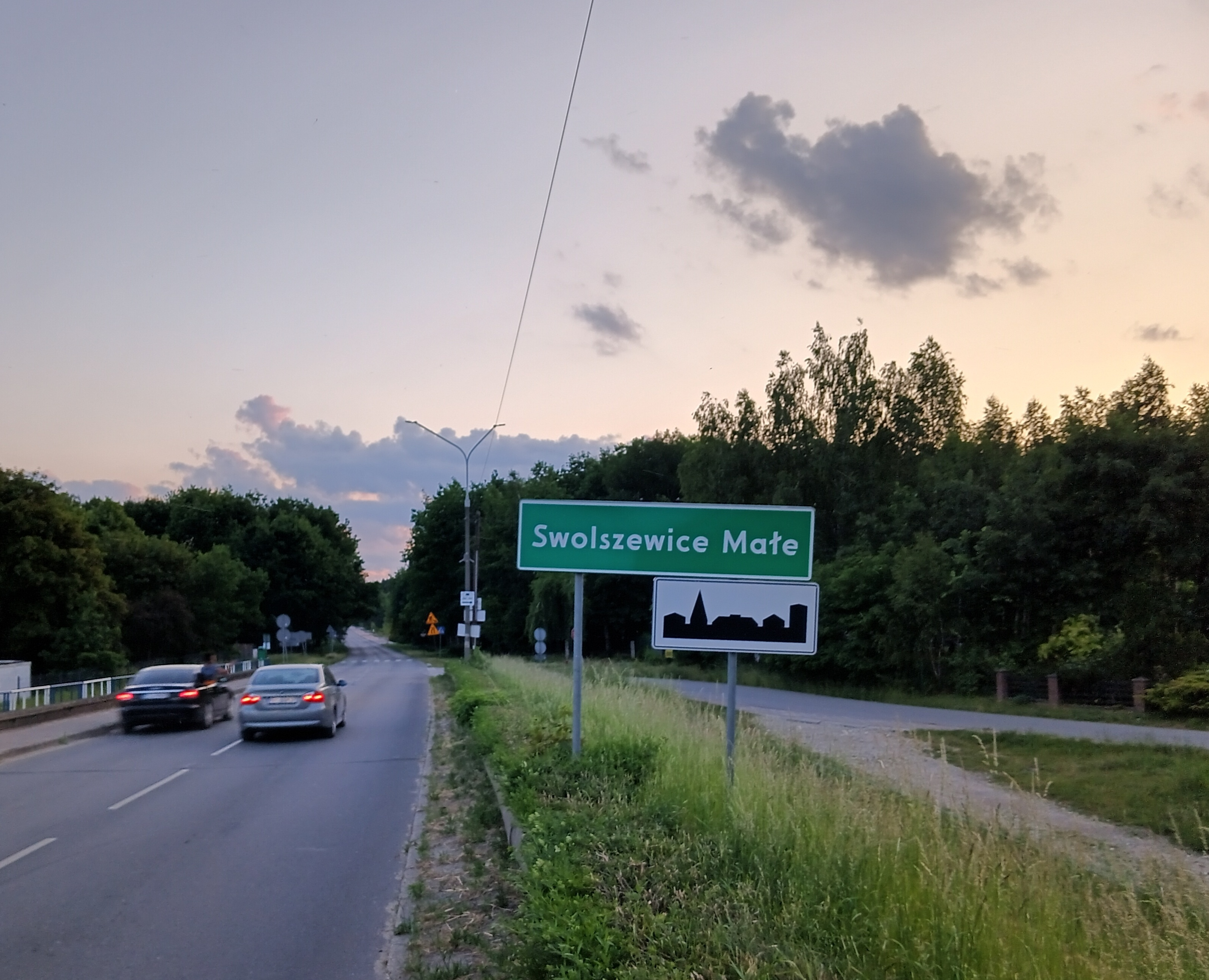

- Location within Poland
- Coordinates: 51°29′N 19°58′E
- Country: Poland
- Voivodeship: Łódź
- County: Tomaszów
- Gmina: Tomaszów Mazowiecki

Swolszewice Małe [sfɔlʂɛˈvit͡sɛ ˈmawɛ] is a village in the administrative district of Gmina Tomaszów Mazowiecki, within Tomaszów County, Łódź Voivodeship, in central Poland.
