= Spała =

- Village
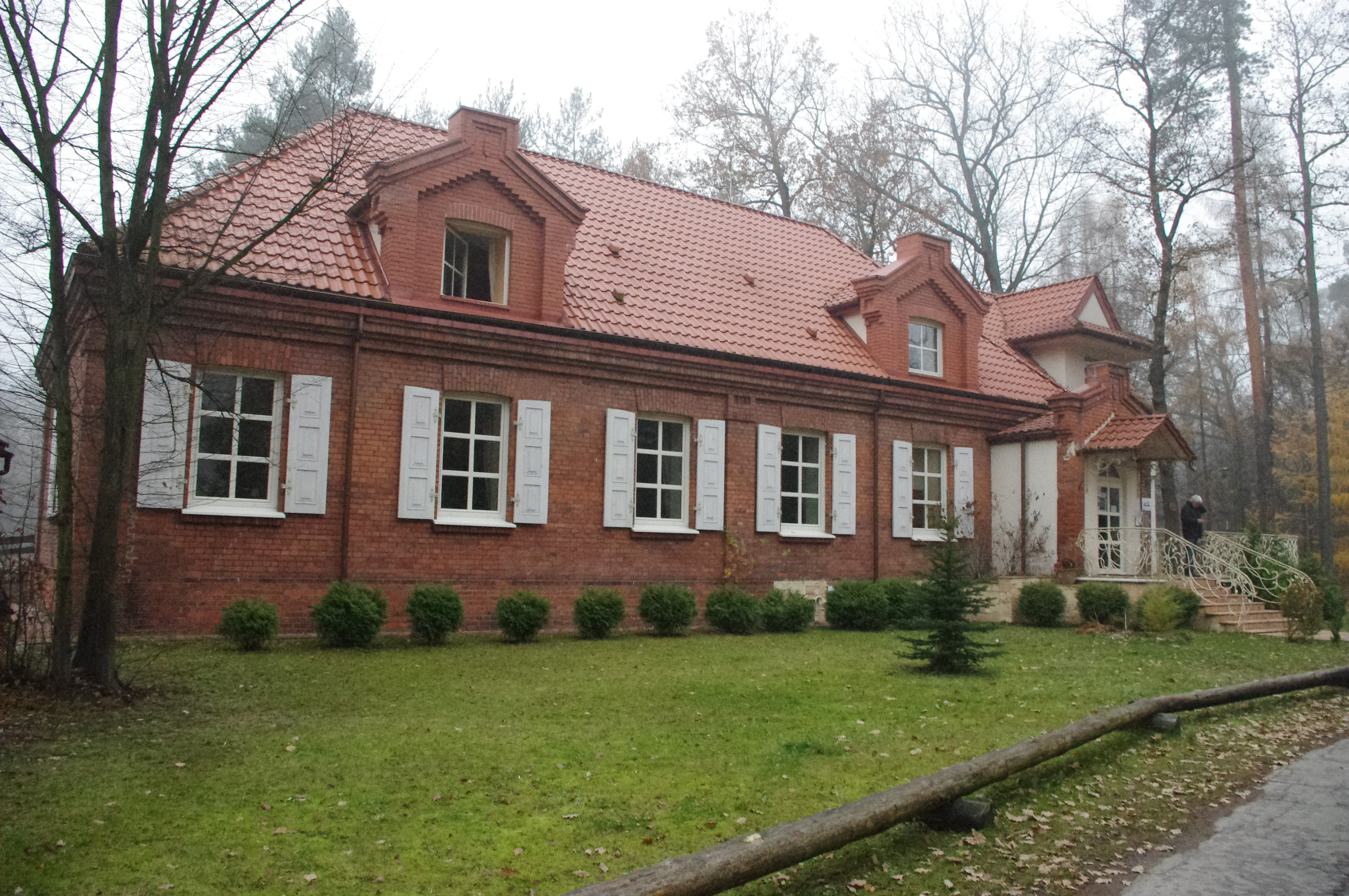
- Tsar's Manor House in Spała

- Location within Poland
- Coordinates: 51°32′28″N 20°8′17″E
- Country: Poland
- Voivodeship: Łódź
- County: Tomaszów
- Gmina: Inowłódz
- Population (2011): 484

Spała [ˈspawa] is a village in the administrative district of Gmina Inowłódz, within Tomaszów County, Łódź Voivodeship, in central Poland. The village gives its name to the protected area called Spała Landscape Park.

== Notable occurrences ==
- Spała was the location of a hunting lodge owned by Emperor Nicholas II of Russia. In 1912, Grigori Rasputin allegedly healed the Tsarevich Alexei Nikolaevich, who suffered from haemophilia, from a near-fatal haemorrhage.
- Spała was the site of the Central European Jamboree in 1935, and of the International Young Physicists' Tournament in 1995.

== Sport ==
The village is the site of the Olympic Preparation Centre, which is a professional training base for national and Olympic teams of many disciplines. The sports indoor arena was built in 1988 and is among the biggest ones in Poland.

== Demographics ==
Demographic structure as of 31 March 2011
	In general	Pre-working age	Working age	Post-working age
Male	238	52	156	30
Female	201	41	136	69
Both	484	93	292	99

== Gallery ==
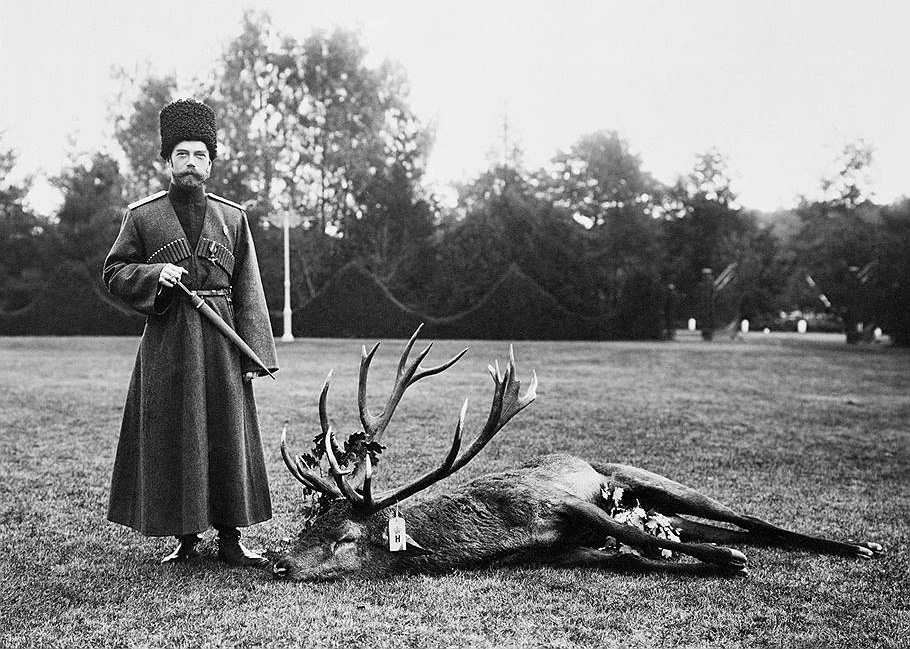
Nicholas II in Spała, 1912

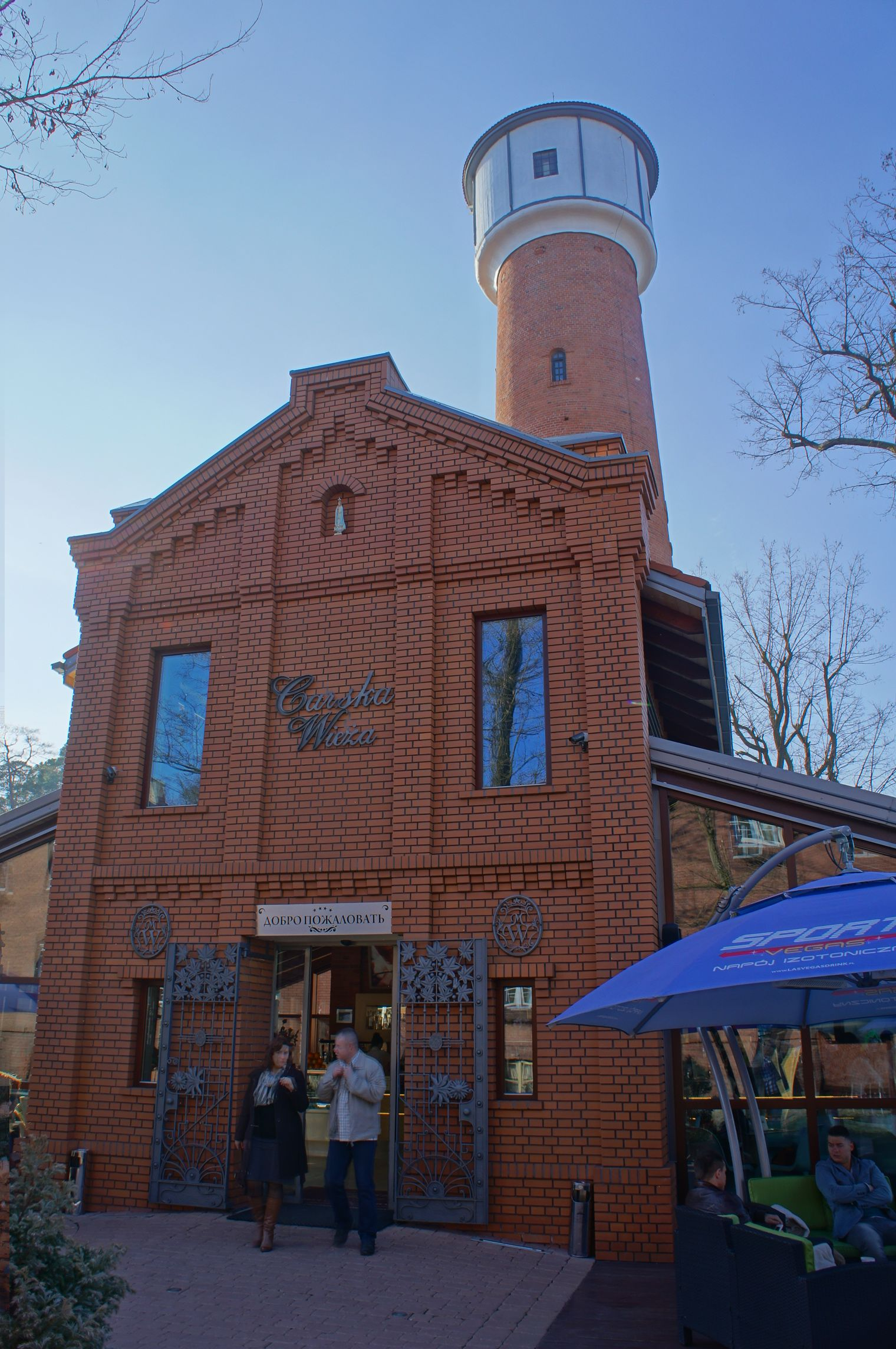
Tsar's Tower

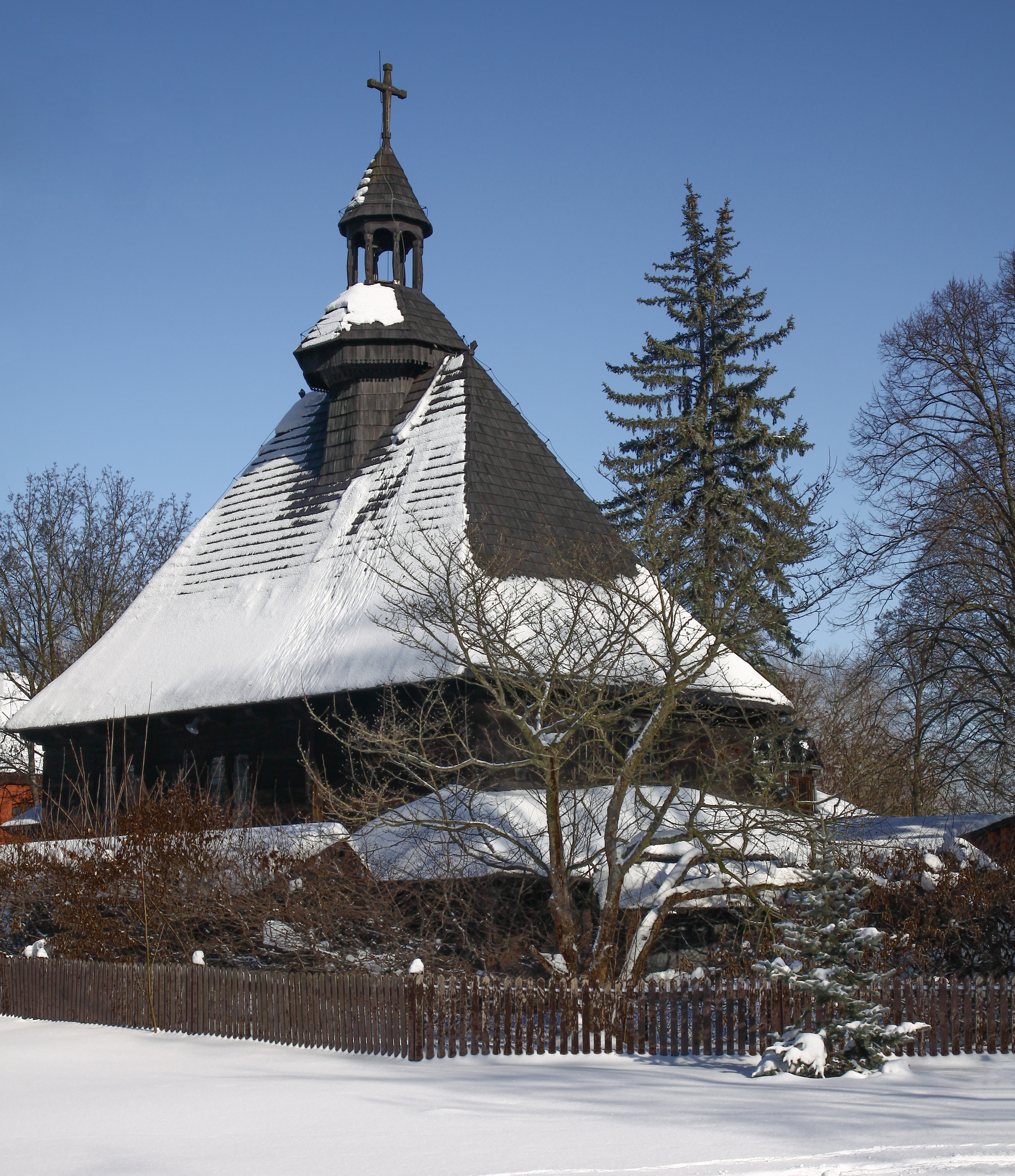
Chapel of the Holy Virgin Mary, the Queen of the Polish Crown

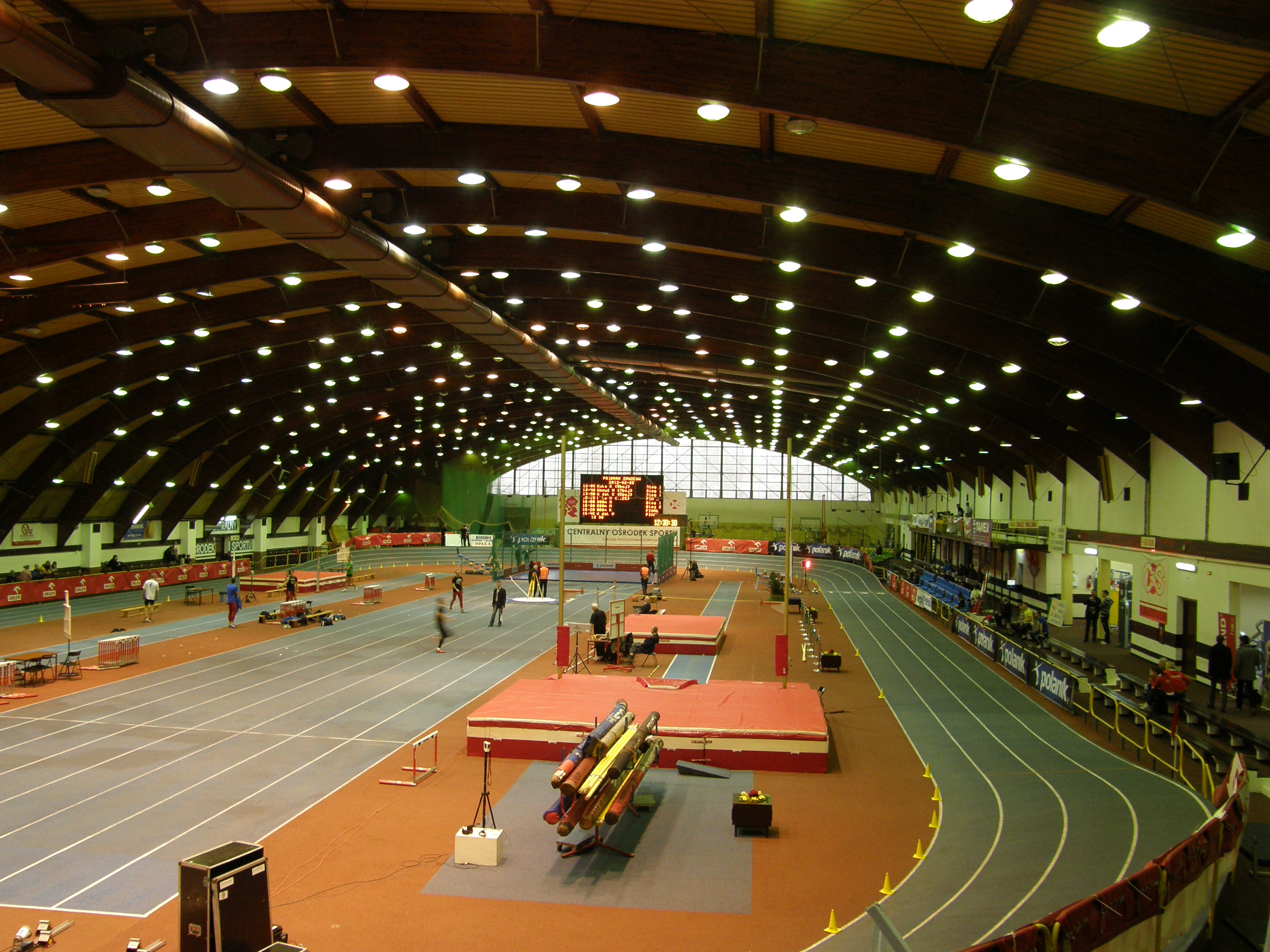
Olympic Preparation Centre Indoor Arena in Spała

== See also ==
- Sport in Poland
- List of indoor arenas in Poland
