= Jadwigów, Łódź Voivodeship =

Jadwigów
- Village
- Location within Poland
- Coordinates: 51°30′45″N 19°55′25″E
- Country: Poland
- Voivodeship: Łódź
- County: Tomaszów
- Gmina: Tomaszów Mazowiecki

Jadwigów [jadˈviɡuf] is a village in the administrative district of Gmina Tomaszów Mazowiecki, within Tomaszów County, Łódź Voivodeship, in central Poland.
