= Spała Landscape Park =

Protected area in Poland

Coordinates: 51°32′45″N 20°13′30″E

- Spalski Park Krajobrazowy
- IUCN category V (protected landscape/seascape)
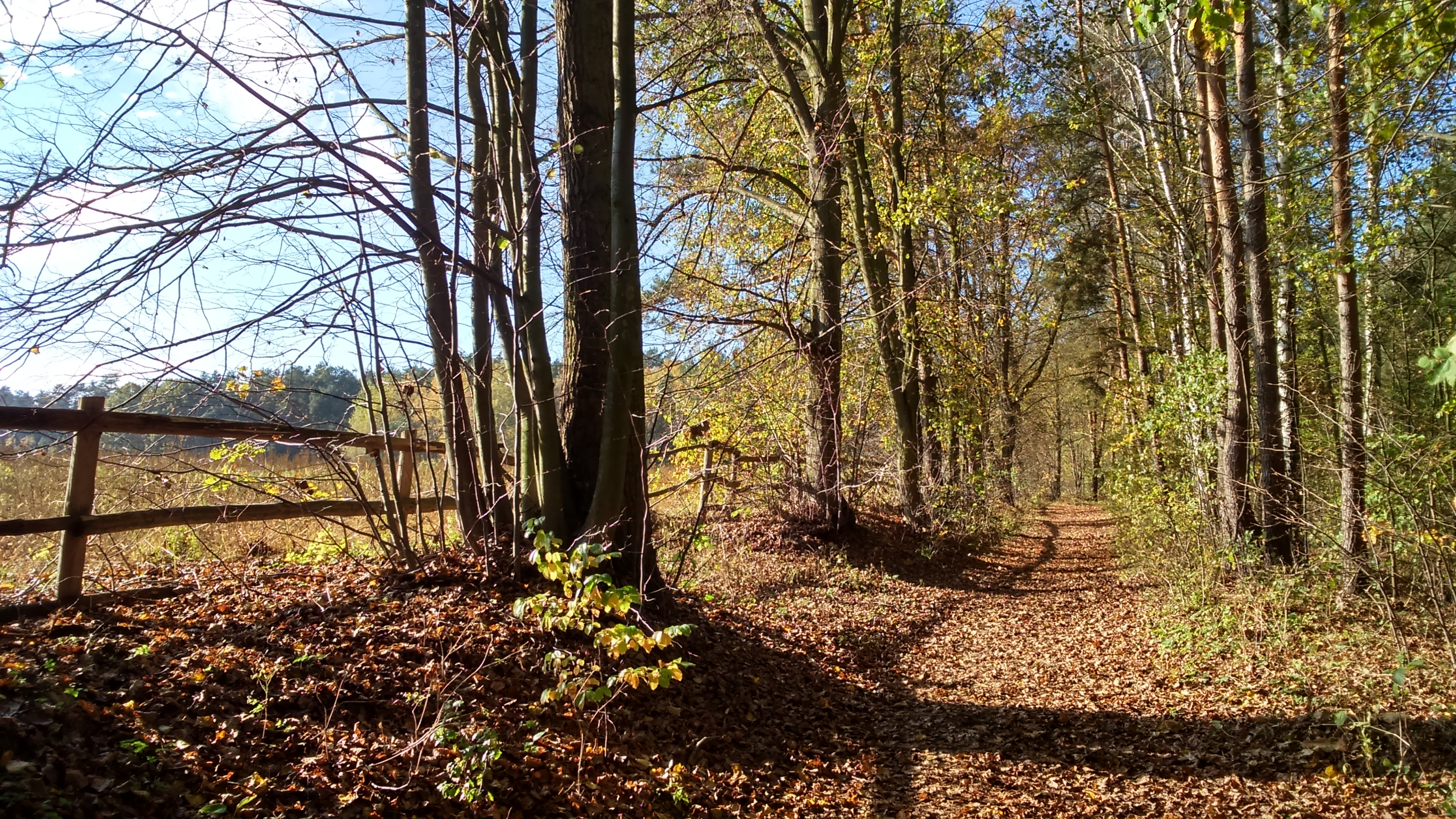
- Interactive map of Spała Landscape Park
- Location: Łódź Voivodeship
- Area: 128.75 km^{2} (49.71 sq mi)
- Established: 1995

Spała Landscape Park (Spalski Park Krajobrazowy) is a protected area (Landscape Park) in central Poland, established in 1995, covering an area of 128.75 square kilometres (49.71 sq mi). It takes its name from the village of Spała.

The Park lies within Łódź Voivodeship: in Opoczno County (Gmina Opoczno, Gmina Poświętne, Gmina Sławno) and Tomaszów County (Gmina Czerniewice, Gmina Inowłódz, Gmina Lubochnia, Gmina Rzeczyca, Gmina Tomaszów Mazowiecki).

Within the Landscape Park are five nature reserves.

There are three nature reserves on its territory: Konewka, Spała and Żądłowice. The next three reserves are located in the park's buffer zone: Jeleń, Sługocice and Gać Spalska.
