= Łazisko, Łódź Voivodeship =

Łazisko
- Village
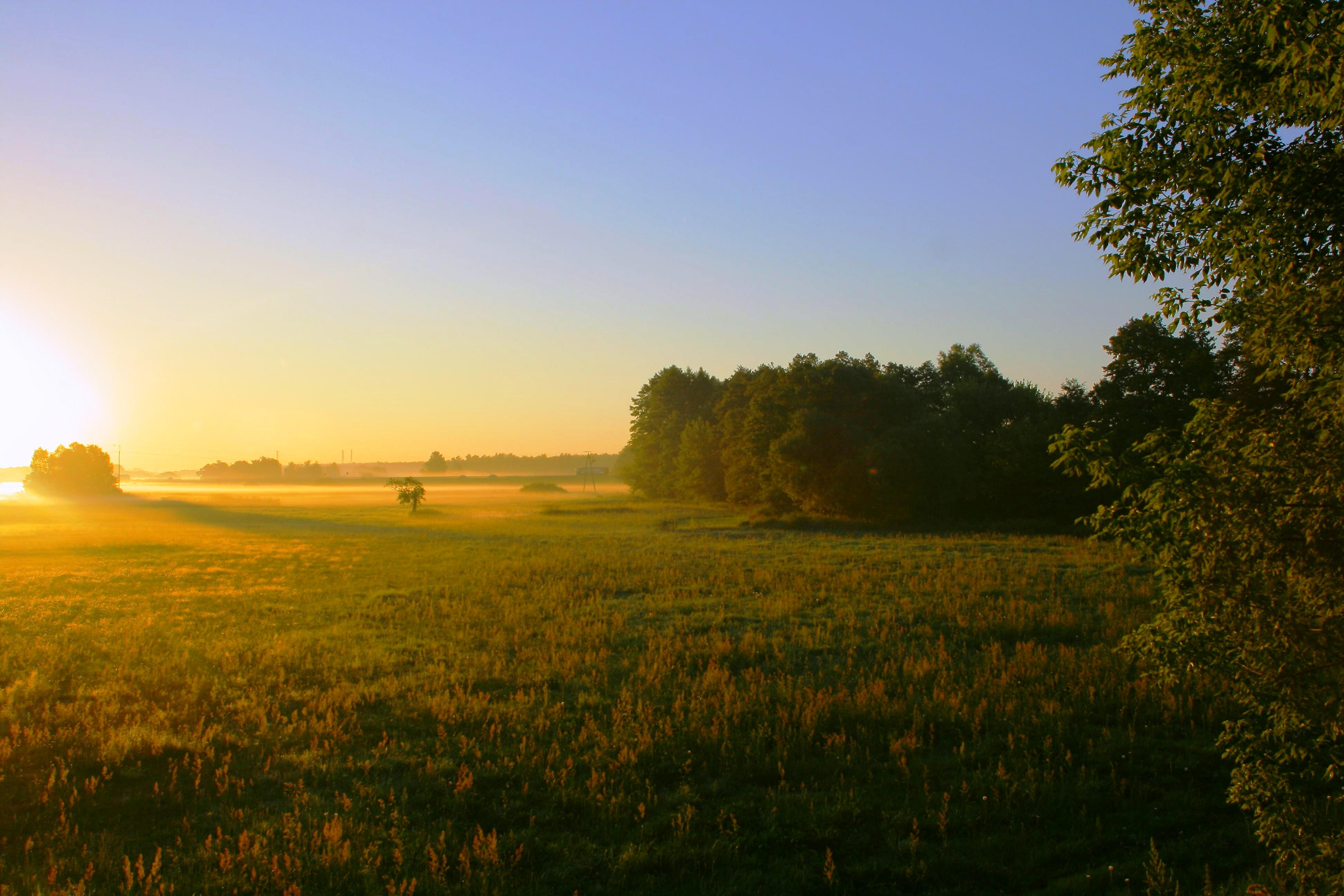

- Location within Poland
- Coordinates: 51°32′56″N 19°56′36″E
- Country: Poland
- Voivodeship: Łódź
- County: Tomaszów
- Gmina: Tomaszów Mazowiecki

Łazisko [waˈʑiskɔ] is a village in the administrative district of Gmina Tomaszów Mazowiecki, within Tomaszów County, Łódź Voivodeship, in central Poland.
