= Jeleń, Łódź Voivodeship =

Jeleń
- Village
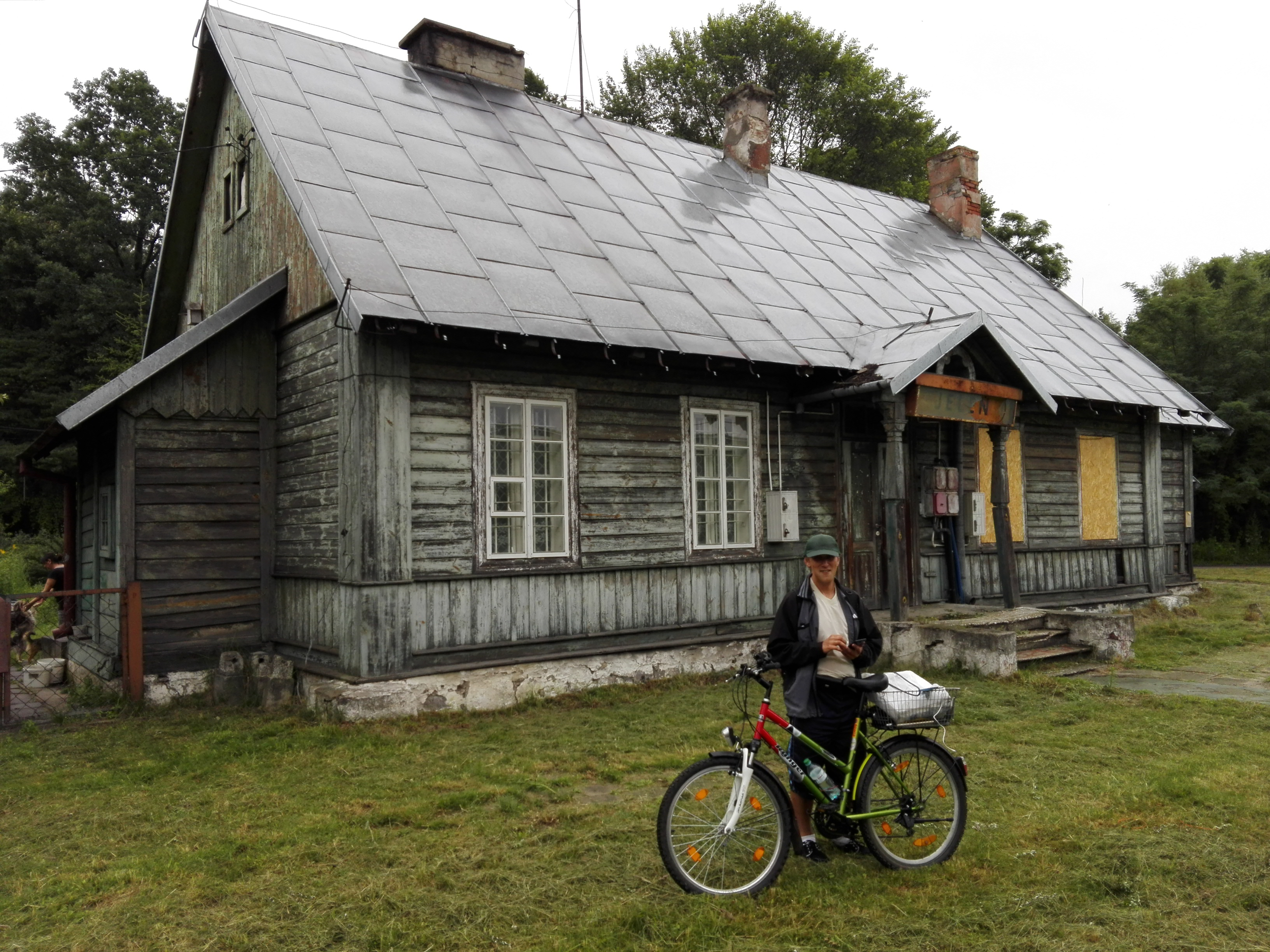

- Location within Poland
- Coordinates: 51°30′17″N 20°4′53″E
- Country: Poland
- Voivodeship: Łódź
- County: Tomaszów
- Gmina: Tomaszów Mazowiecki

Jeleń [ˈjɛlɛɲ] is a village in the administrative district of Gmina Tomaszów Mazowiecki, within Tomaszów County, Łódź Voivodeship, in central Poland.
