= Pilica (river) =

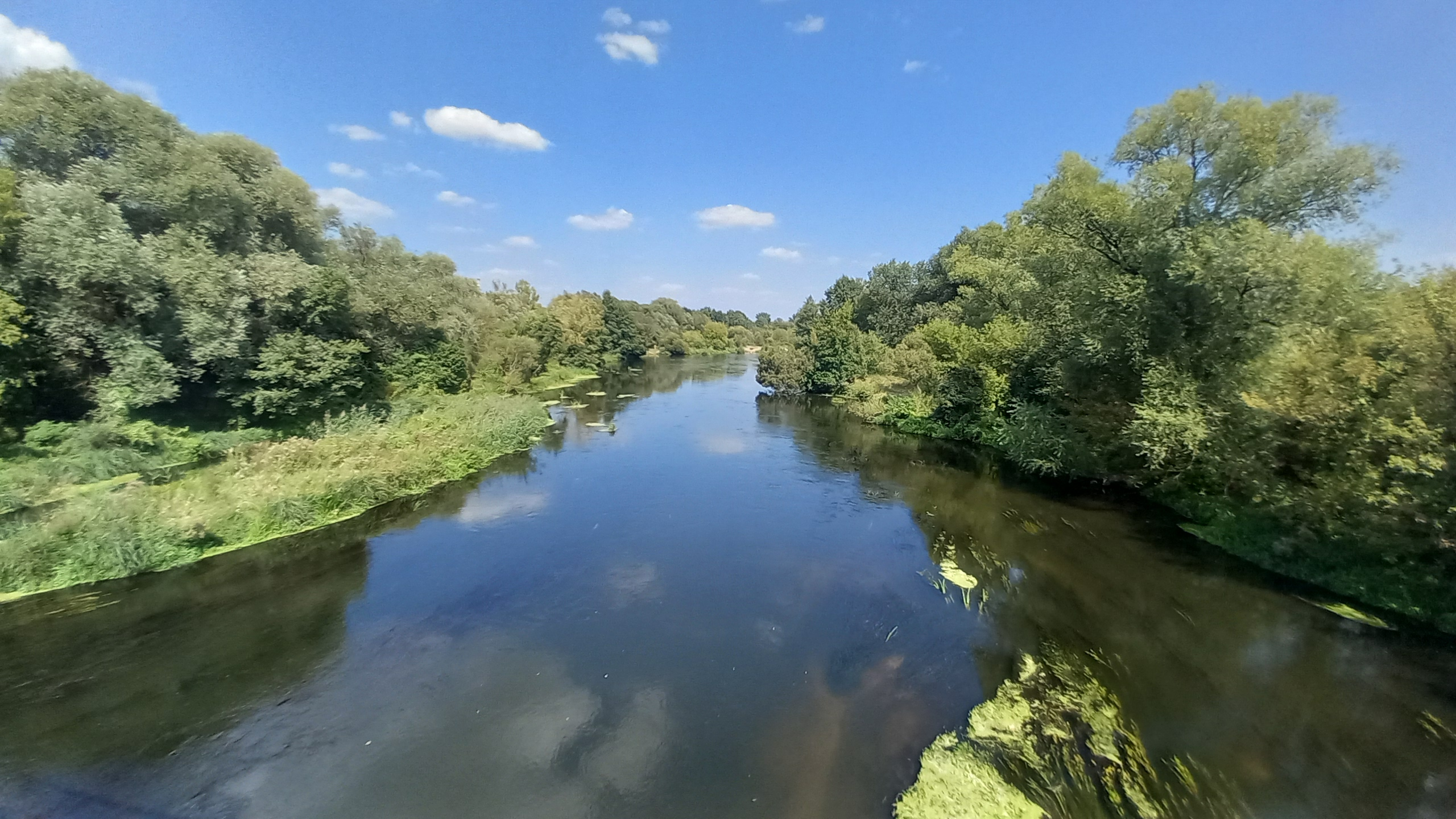
- Pilica river in Tomaszów Mazowiecki (Białobrzeska Street)

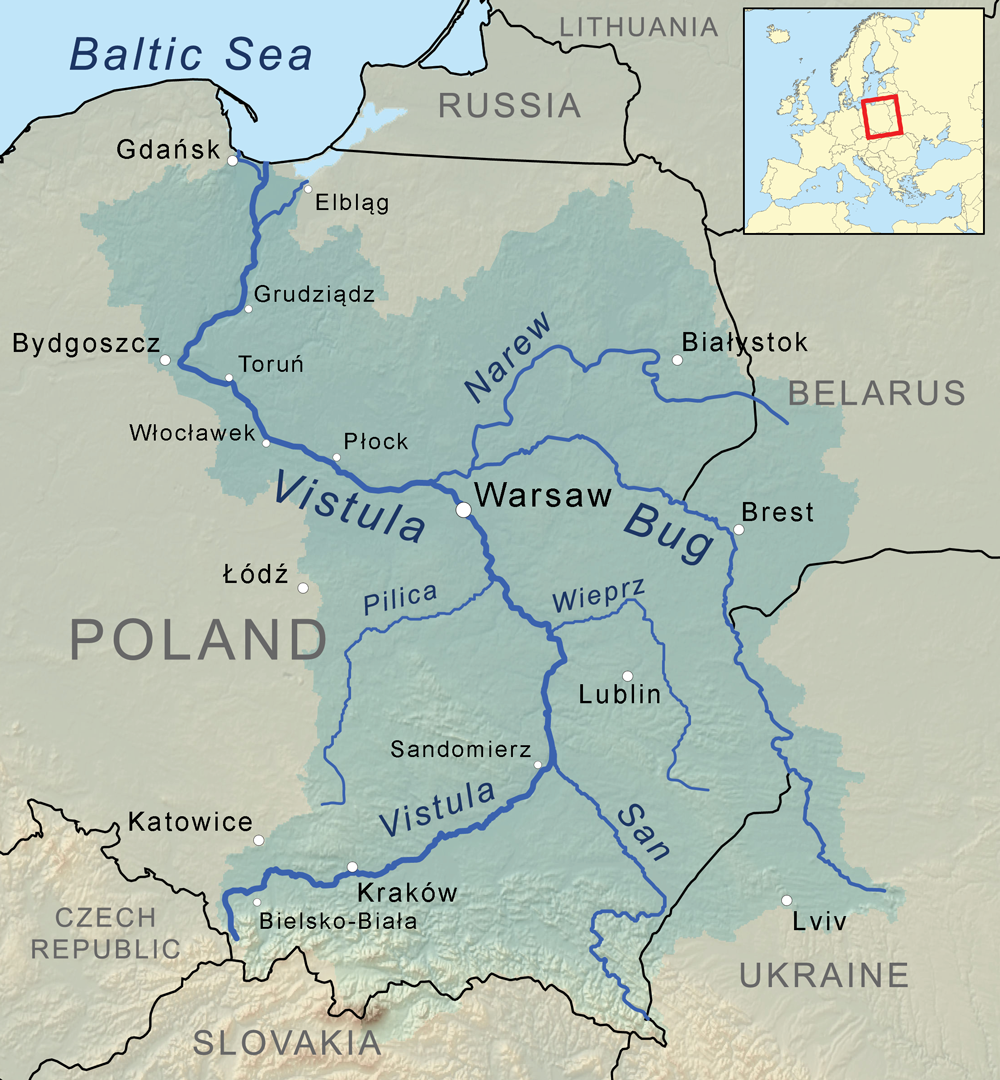
- Pilica River in the Vistula watershed

Location
- Country: Poland

Physical characteristics
- Source
  - location: Poland
- Mouth
  - location: Vistula near Ostrówek
  - coordinates: 51°51′41″N 21°16′50″E
- Length: 333 km (207 mi)
- Basin size: 9,258 km^{2} (3,575 sq mi)
- Discharge
  - average: 47.4 m^{3}/s (1,670 cu ft/s)

Basin features
- Progression: Vistula→ Baltic Sea

The Pilica is a river in central Poland, and the longest left tributary of the Vistula river, with a length of 333 kilometres (8th longest). All 9,258 km^{2} of its basin area is in Poland.

It flows through the Polish Jura, after which it enters Central Polish Plains. Pilica flows into the Vistula near the village of Ostrówek, in a geographical region of Central Vistula Valley. In 1974, a dam was built near Sulejów, resulting in the creation of man-made reservoir Sulejów Lake, which has the area of 2,700 hectares. The region in the basin of the Pilica is sometimes called Nadpilicze, and the river itself marks the boundary between Lesser Poland, and two other historical provinces of the country, Greater Poland and Mazovia.

The first "open-air river museum" in Poland, the Open-air museum of Pilica river, is located on the waterway and the Blue Springs nature reserve lies next to the river.

== Towns ==
- Pilica
- Szczekociny
- Koniecpol
- Przedbórz
- Sulejów
- Tomaszów Mazowiecki
- Spała
- Inowłódz
- Nowe Miasto nad Pilicą
- Wyśmierzyce
- Białobrzegi
- Warka

== Left tributaries ==
- Luciąża
- Rykolanka
- Wolborka

== Right tributaries ==
- Czarna (Włoszczowska)
- Czarna (Konecka)
- Drzewiczka

== A kayak route ==
A 228 km long "Szlak wodny Pilicy" is a kayak route on Pilica River. It begins in Zarzecze near Szczekociny and ends on a mouth of the Pilica River. Points on the route:

- Zarzecze near Szczekociny
- Przedbórz
- Faliszew
- Skotniki (Gmina Aleksandrów, Łódź Voivodeship)
- Sulejów
- Sulejowski Reservoir
- Tomaszów Mazowiecki
- Spała
- Inowłódz
- Żądłowice
- Grotowice
- Domaniewice
- Nowe Miasto nad Pilicą
- Białobrzegi
- Warka
- a mouth of the Pilica River

A section of the river is a Natura 2000 EU Special Protection Area.

== See also ==
- Rivers of Poland
- Special Protection Areas in Poland
- Natura 2000 in Poland
