= Louis Israel Newman =

American Reform rabbi and author

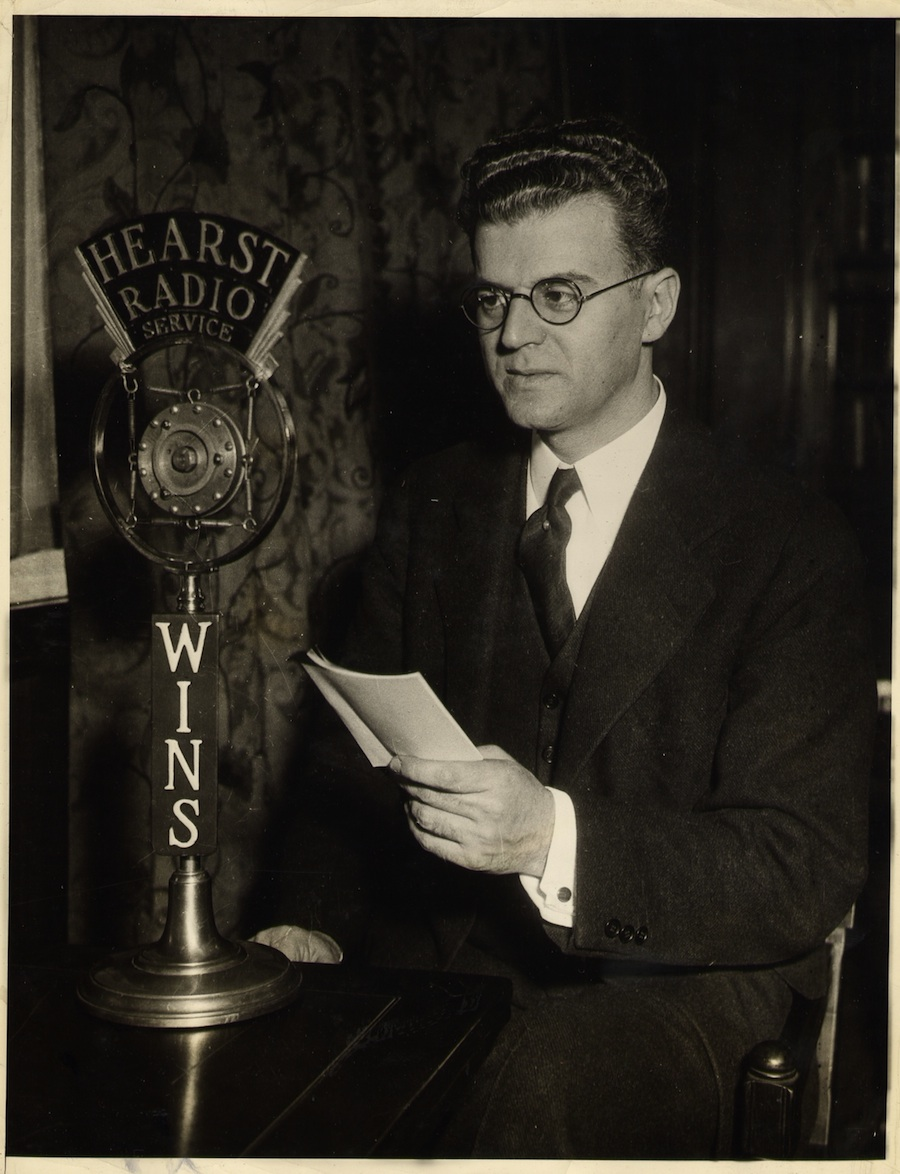
- Newman reading a story for WINS, c. 1930s
- Born: December 20, 1893; Providence, Rhode Island, US
- Died: March 9, 1972 (aged 78); New York City, New York, US
- Education: Brown University (B.A.); University of California, Berkeley (M.A.); Columbia University (Ph.D.)

Louis Israel Newman (December 20, 1893 – March 9, 1972) was an American Reform rabbi, and author. While working in New York City, Newman later became a member of the Zionist Revisionist movement. He worked as a rabbi in San Francisco, Berkeley, New York City, and Waltham, Massachusetts. Newman was known for his progressive views, his involvement in the Zionist Revisionist movement, and his prolific writing, which included books on Jewish history, theology, and identity.

== Early life ==
Born in Providence, Rhode Island, on December 20, 1893, to Paul and Antonia (née Hecker) Newman, Louis Israel Newman attended Brown University (B.A. 1913), and then went on to receive an M.A. from the University of California, Berkeley in 1917, and a Ph.D. from Columbia University in 1924.

From 1913 to 1916, Newman served as rabbi of Congregation Beth Israel (Berkeley, California). In 1917, Newman became an assistant to Rabbi Stephen Wise at the Free Synagogue in New York City and then was ordained by Stephen Wise and Martin Meyer in 1918.

== Career ==
After his ordination, Newman became rabbi of the Bronx Free Synagogue (1918–21). In 1921, he became rabbi of Temple Israel in New York City and was appointed to the faculty of the Jewish Institute of Religion (JIR) when it was founded the following year. In 1924, Newman moved to San Francisco, replacing Martin A. Meyer as rabbi of Temple Emanu-El.

In 1930, Newman returned to New York City to become rabbi of Temple Rodeph Sholom. He stayed in this pulpit until his retirement in 1972. During his tenure at Temple Rodeph Sholom, Newman became active in the Zionist Revisionist movement, was the chairman of the Palestine Mandate Defense Fund, and was honorary chairman of both the Revisionist Tel Hai Fund and the American Friends of a Jewish Palestine. He once again served on the faculty of the JIR. He also served on the American Advisory Committee for the Hebrew University and as a vice president of the American Jewish Congress.

== Brandeis University ==
Newman was the visionary for Brandeis University.

[I]t was Newman's proposal, published in the Jewish Tribune, which inexplicably garnered the attention and raised the eyebrows of American Jewry. [He] had firsthand knowledge of the Jewish quota, having attended Brown University at a time when the school's administration imposed "limitations in the enrollment of Jews and Negroes." ... Newman worried about the very practical problem that, as a result of limited educational opportunities, American Jews were in jeopardy of being further rejected from "higher spheres of the professions and commerce".

There were many other proposals, but Newman continued steadfast in his work for his vision of a Jewish university. He published a slim volume, appropriately titled, A Jewish University in America? (1923), featuring an expanded version of his original essay and a collection of the articles and letters that had appeared on the subject.

In 1945, Newman was recruited by Rabbi Israel Goldstein, to join a group of men to consider the possibility of opening a Jewish university in Waltham, Massachusetts, some ten miles northwest of Boston. For his obvious interest and expertise in the matter, Goldstein was delighted to "have the friendly support of Rabbi Louis I. Newman."

== Writings ==
Newman was a prolific writer and playwright. Some of his works include: Jewish Influence on Christian Reform Movements (1924) and Jewish People, Faith and Life (1957). He also compiled and translated the classic work The Hasidic Anthology, Tales and Teachings of the Hasidim: The parables, folk-tales, fables, aphorisms, epigrams, sayings, anecdotes, proverbs, and exegetical interpretations of the Hasidic masters and disciples; their lore and wisdom (1934, 1968, 1972), which has become a standard textbook for courses in Jewish studies. Newman's Trumpet in Adversity and Other Poems (1948) is an anthology of Newman's poetry including "The Voice of God," often misattributed to John Henry Newman.

== Personal life ==
In 1923, Newman married Lucille Helene Uhry, daughter of Edmond and Lillian (née Hessberg) Uhry. Together they had three sons, Jeremy Uhry Newman, Jonathan Uhry Newman, and Daniel Uhry Newman.

Rabbi Louis Israel Newman died at the age of 78 on March 9, 1972, in New York City.
