= Wytoka, Łódź Voivodeship =

Wytoka
- Settlement
- Location within Poland
- Coordinates: 51°00′03″N 18°31′57″E
- Country: Poland
- Voivodeship: Łódź
- County: Tomaszów
- Gmina: Inowłódz

Wytoka [vɨˈtɔka] is a settlement in the administrative district of Gmina Inowłódz, within Tomaszów County, Łódź Voivodeship, in central Poland.
