= Rykolanka =

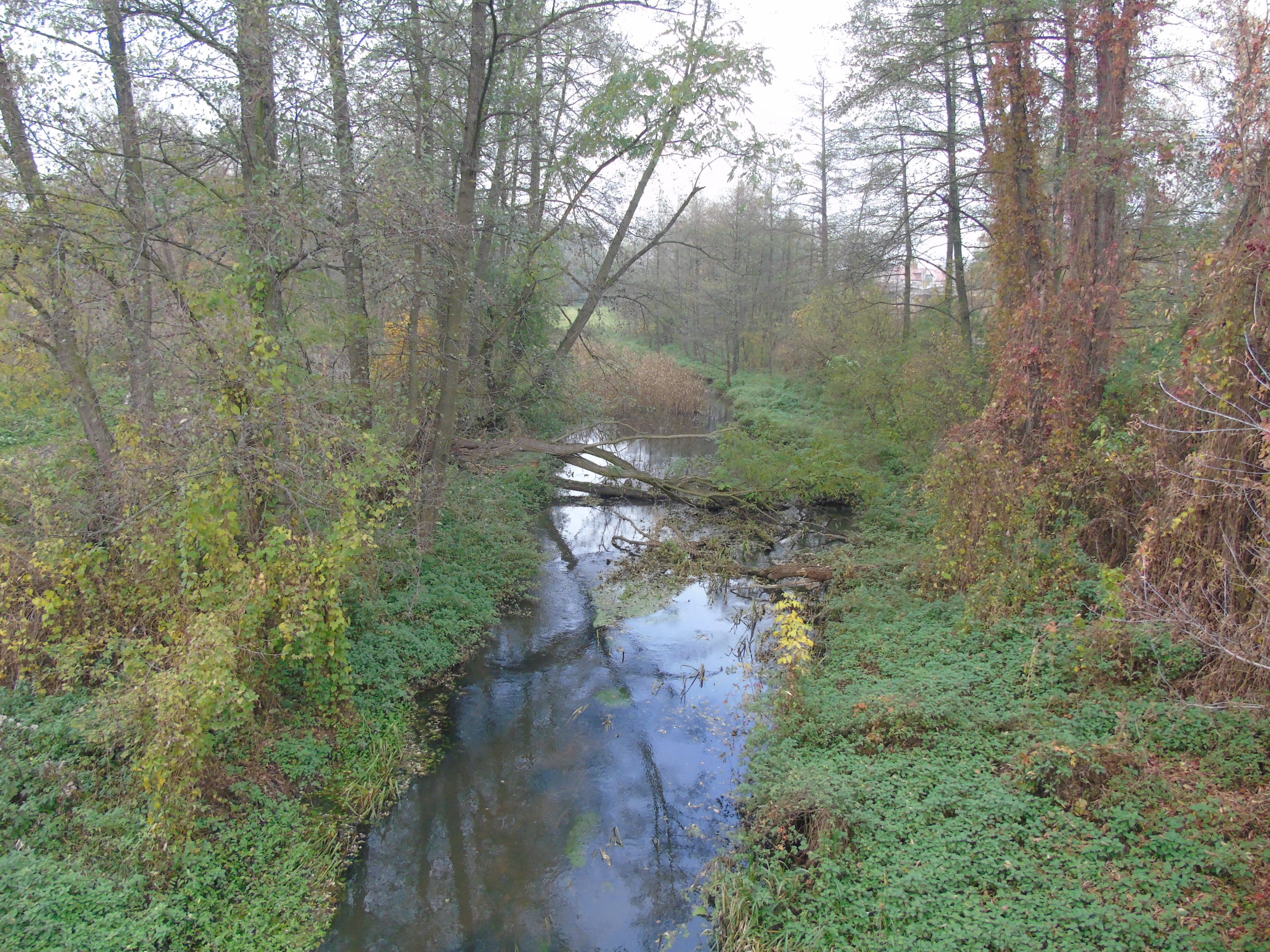

Location
- Country: Poland

Physical characteristics
- Mouth
  - location: Pilica
  - coordinates: 51°39′27″N 20°50′53″E

Basin features
- Progression: Pilica→ Vistula→ Baltic Sea

Rykolanka (in its upper course: Dylówka) is a river of Poland, a left tributary of the Pilica near Przybyszew.
