= Brzustów, Łódź Voivodeship =

Brzustów
- Village
- Location within Poland
- Coordinates: 51°29′48″N 20°9′31″E
- Country: Poland
- Voivodeship: Łódź
- County: Tomaszów
- Gmina: Inowłódz
- Population: 950

Brzustów [ˈbʐustuf] is a village in the administrative district of Gmina Inowłódz, within Tomaszów County, Łódź Voivodeship, in central Poland.
