= Führer Headquarters Anlage Mitte =

Nazi military bunker in Poland

- Near Tomaszów Mazowiecki in Poland
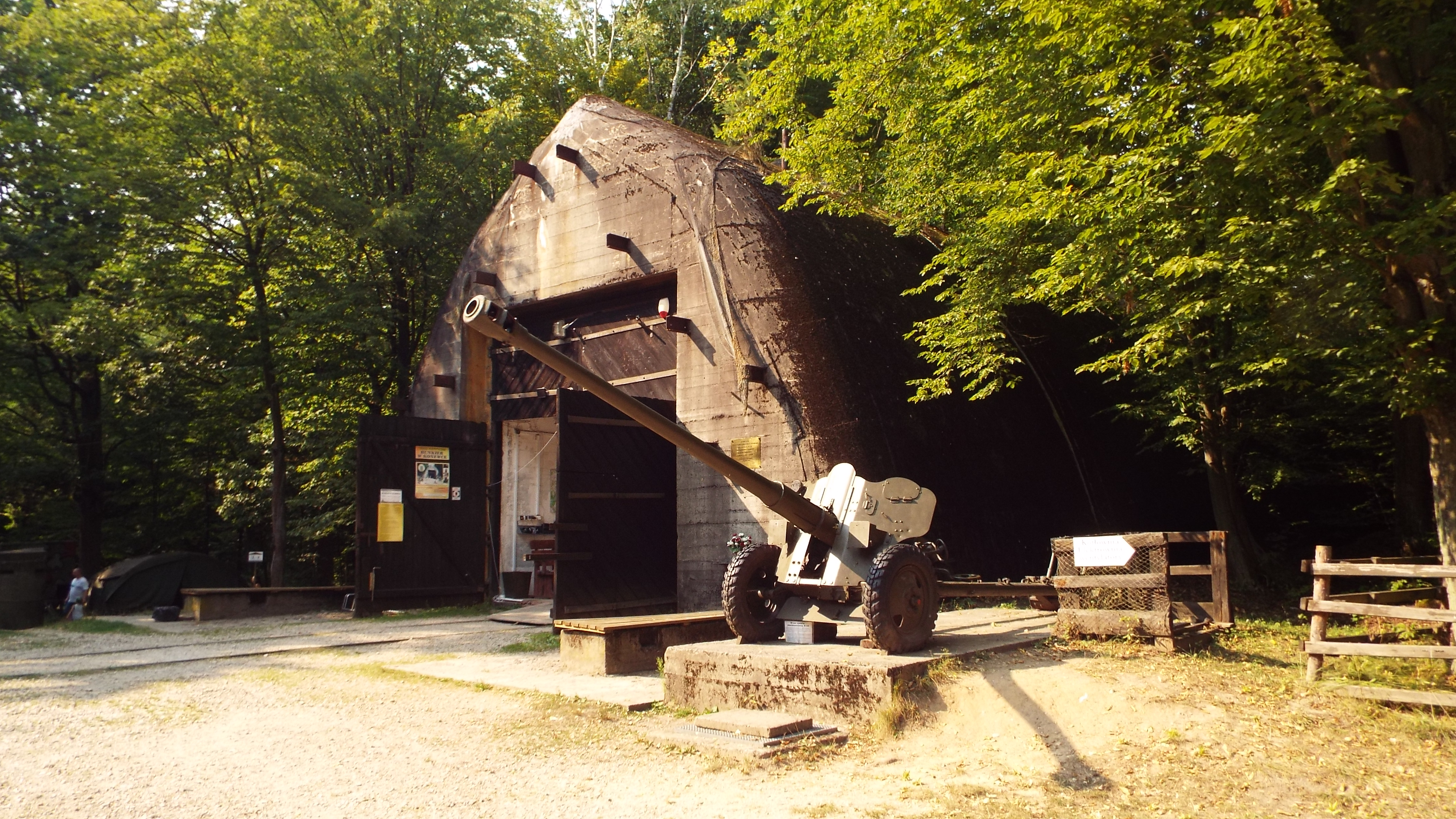
- Bunker in Konewka

Site information
- Type: Führer Headquarters
- Open to the public: Yes

Location
- Coordinates: 51.56195°N 20.151731°E

The Führerhauptquartier Anlage Mitte, also known as Askania Mitte, was a bunker planned as a Führer Headquarters for Adolf Hitler, who never used it. It was built during the Second World War near Tomaschow Mazowiecki in the western administered area of the General Government.

The facility consisted of two railway bunkers. One bunker was at the village of Konewka (51°33′40″N 20°9′22″E) the other at the village of Jelen (51°30′11″N 20°4′48″E). The complex has not been destroyed, is in good condition and can be visited.
