= Inowłódz =

- Town
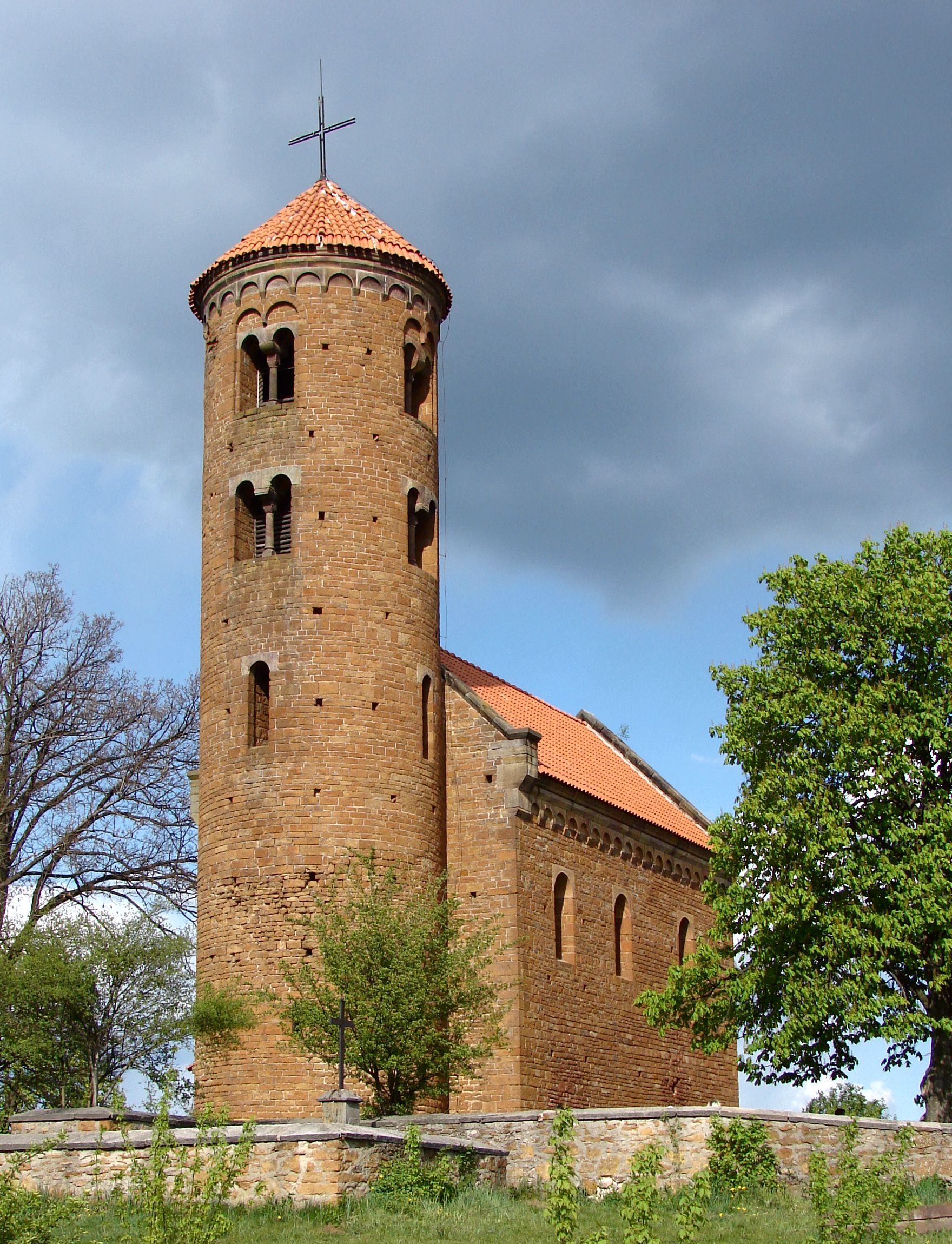
- Church of Saint Giles from 11th century

- Coat of arms

- Location within Poland
- Coordinates: 51°31′37″N 20°13′17″E
- Country: Poland
- Voivodeship: Łódź
- County: Tomaszów
- Gmina: Inowłódz

Population
  - Total: 795
- Time zone: UTC+1 (CET)
  - Summer (DST): UTC+2 (CEST)
- Vehicle registration: ETM

Inowłódz [iˈnɔvwut͡s] is a town in Tomaszów County, Łódź Voivodeship, in central Poland. It is the seat of the gmina (administrative district) called Gmina Inowłódz. It lies approximately 15 kilometres (9 mi) east of Tomaszów Mazowiecki and 60 km (37 mi) south-east of the regional capital Łódź.

== History ==
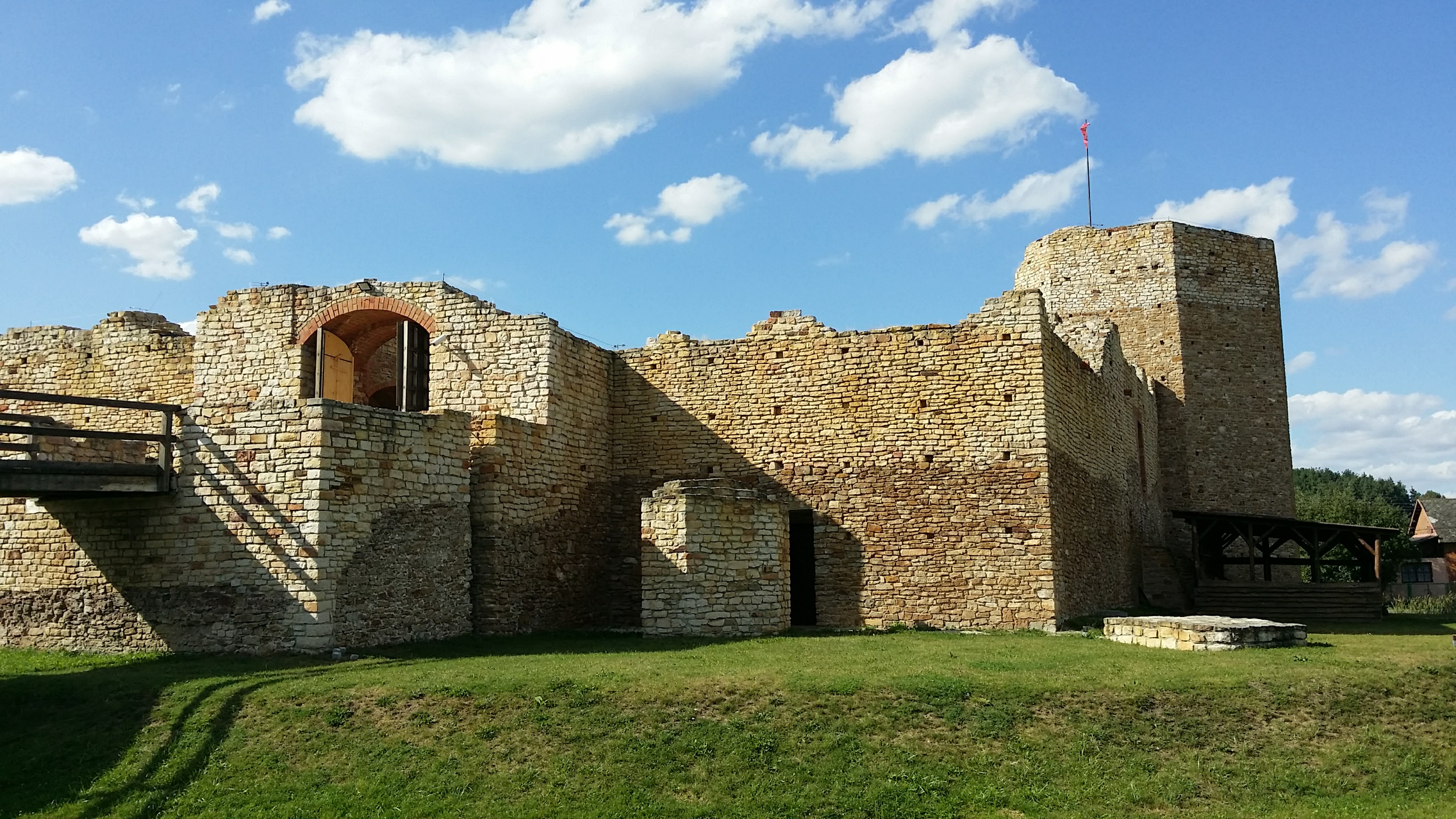
Inowłódz Castle

Inowłódz is one of the oldest towns in Poland. It was first mentioned in documents from 1145, and by then, it already had a public house, a church, a fair, and a custom house, located on the Pilica crossing. The river itself marks here the border between two historic provinces of Poland – Lesser Poland and the Łęczyca Land. Furthermore, a few kilometers to the northeast lies the province of Mazovia.

In the early days of the Kingdom of Poland, the Inowłódz river crossing was an important element of an international merchant route from Toruń towards the Kingdom of Hungary. The village was granted Magdeburg rights in the mid-14th century, but exact date is not known. Inowłódz quickly developed, and in the 14th and 15th centuries was an important center of brewing and grain commerce. In 1370, the town was surrounded by a defensive wall, and a castle, which was the seat of a starosta, was built. The Inowłódz stronghold was a part of the defensive system of the Kingdom of Poland. Inowłódz was a royal town, administratively located in the Brzeziny County in the Łęczyca Voivodeship in the Greater Poland Province.

The period of prosperity ended during the Swedish invasion of Poland (1655–1660), when Inowłódz was destroyed by Swedish soldiers. In September 1655, a skirmish between Swedes and Polish division of Stefan Czarniecki took place here. Together with the town, Swedish invaders destroyed the castle, after which the starostas had to live in a small house in the town. In the 18th century, Inowłódz became a center of industry, with iron works and lime excavation. After the Partitions of Poland, the town belonged to the Russian-controlled Congress Poland (1815–1915), and following the January Uprising, lost its town charter (1870).

In the late 19th century, Inowłódz became a spa, popular among residents of Łódź and Warsaw. In 1884, a spa center with guest houses and bath was opened by Bernard Birenzweig, and among the visitors was Julian Tuwim, who liked to come here for the summer vacation. The development of the Inowłódz spa ended during World War I, when the village found itself on the frontline in December 1914, and was almost completely destroyed, together with the bridge over the Pilica. In the Second Polish Republic, Inowłódz belonged to Łódź Voivodeship, and in 1939 (see Invasion of Poland), the area of the village once again saw heavy fighting, between the Wehrmacht, advancing towards Warsaw, and the Polish Prusy Army. In early 1940, the unit of Major Henryk Dobrzański operated here, the symbolic tomb of Dobrzański is 5 kilometers from Inowłódz.

== Sights ==
The history of the Roman Catholic church of Saint Giles probably dates back to the year 1082. Most likely however, the church was founded during the reign of Boleslaw Krzywousty, in the 1130s. At the same time, a fortified monastery of Benedictine nuns was built by the church. The monastery was destroyed in 1241, during the Mongol invasion of Poland. In 1520, the church of St. Michael was built, which brought about the decline of the Saint Giles church. In 1790, the ancient church was renovated, but three years later, it was ransacked by Prussian soldiers, and turned into a grain storage. The Saint Giles church was completely renovated in the Second Polish Republic, on initiative of President Ignacy Mościcki. First service took place on November 1, 1938.

== Inowłódz in films ==
Inowłódz and the area of the village have for years been popular among Polish film makers. Among movies made here are:

- The Ashes by Andrzej Wajda (1965),
- Czterej pancerni i pies by Konrad Nalecki (1966–1970),
- Colonel Wolodyjowski by Jerzy Hoffman (1969),
- How I Unleashed World War II by Tadeusz Chmielewski (1969),
- Boleslaw Smialy by Witold Lesiewicz (1971),
- Hubal by Bohdan Poręba (1973),
- Epitafium dla Barbary Radziwillowny by Janusz Majewski (1982).
