= Zakościele, Gmina Inowłódz =

Zakościele
- Village
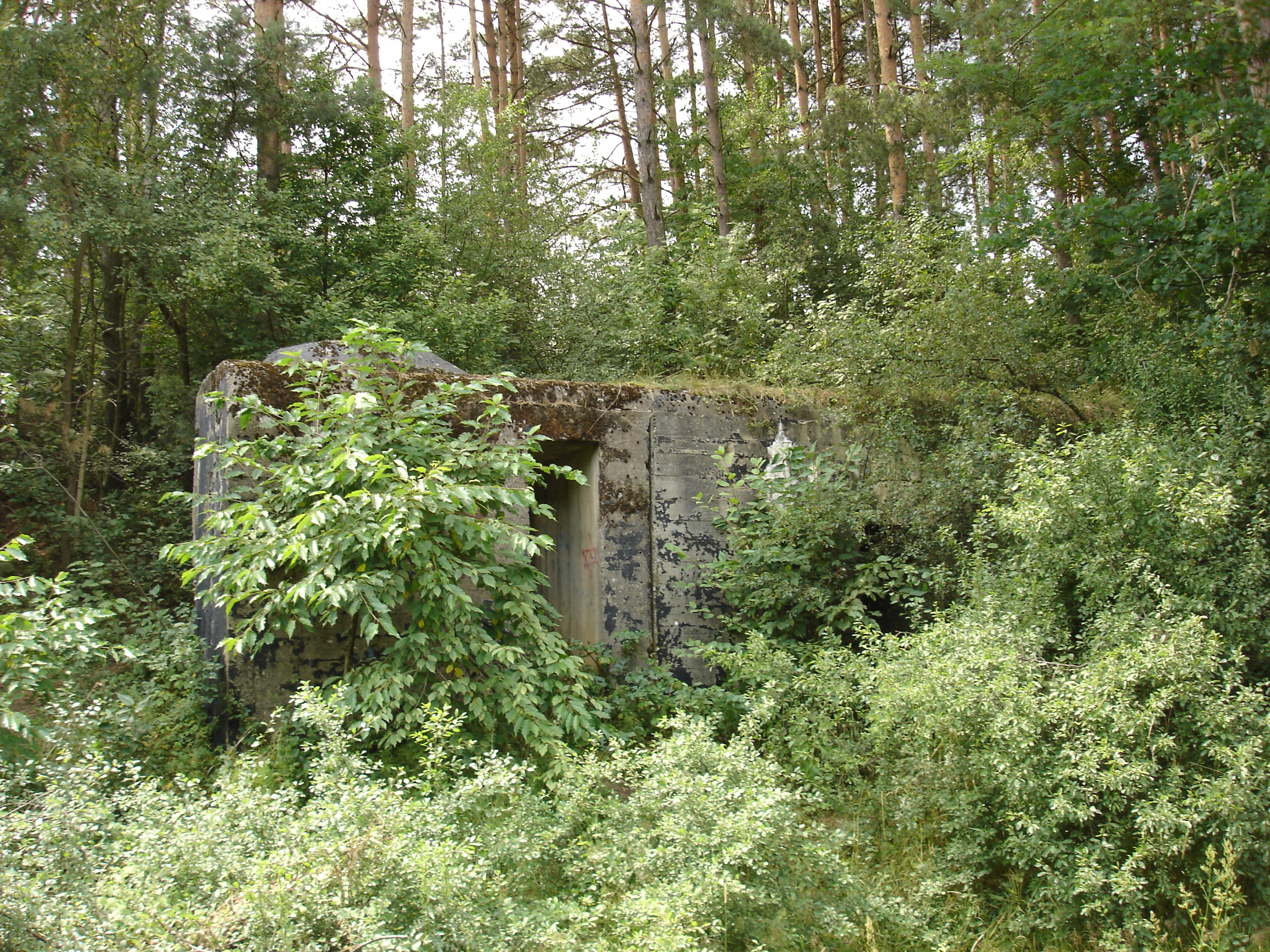
- Bunker

- Location within Poland
- Coordinates: 51°31′48″N 20°14′23″E
- Country: Poland
- Voivodeship: Łódź
- County: Tomaszów
- Gmina: Inowłódz
- Population: 200

Zakościele [zakɔɕˈt͡ɕɛlɛ] is a village in the administrative district of Gmina Inowłódz, within Tomaszów County, Łódź Voivodeship, in central Poland.
