= Teofilów, Gmina Inowłódz =

Teofilów
- Village
- Location within Poland
- Coordinates: 51°32′22″N 20°11′16″E
- Country: Poland
- Voivodeship: Łódź
- County: Tomaszów
- Gmina: Inowłódz

Teofilów [tɛɔˈfiluf] is a village in the administrative district of Gmina Inowłódz, within Tomaszów County, Łódź Voivodeship, in central Poland.
