= Gmina Inowłódz =

Gmina Inowłódz Inowłódz Commune
- Gmina

- Coat of arms
- Interactive map of Gmina Inowłódz
- Coordinates (Inowłódz): 51°31′37″N 20°13′17″E
- Country: Poland
- Voivodeship: Łódź
- County: Tomaszów
- Seat: Inowłódz

Area
  - Total: 98.04 km^{2} (37.85 sq mi)

Population (2006)
  - Total: 3,879
  - Density: 39.57/km^{2} (102.5/sq mi)
- Time zone: UTC+1 (CET)
  - Summer (DST): UTC+2 (CEST)
- Website: www.inowlodz.pl

Gmina Inowłódz is a rural gmina (administrative district) in Tomaszów County, Łódź Voivodeship, in central Poland. Its seat is the village of Inowłódz, which lies approximately 15 kilometres (9 mi) east of Tomaszów Mazowiecki and 60 km (37 mi) south-east of the regional capital Łódź.

The gmina covers an area of 98.04 square kilometres (37.9 sq mi), and as of 2006 its total population is 3,879.

The gmina contains part of the protected area called Spała Landscape Park.

== Villages ==
Gmina Inowłódz contains the villages and settlements of:

- Brzustów
- Dąbrowa
- Inowłódz
- Konewka
- Królowa Wola
- Liciążna
- Poświętne
- Spała
- Teofilów
- Wytoka
- Żądłowice
- Zakościele

== Neighbouring gminas ==
Gmina Inowłódz is bordered by the gminas of Czerniewice, Lubochnia, Opoczno, Poświętne, Rzeczyca, Sławno and Tomaszów Mazowiecki.
