= Liciążna =

- Village
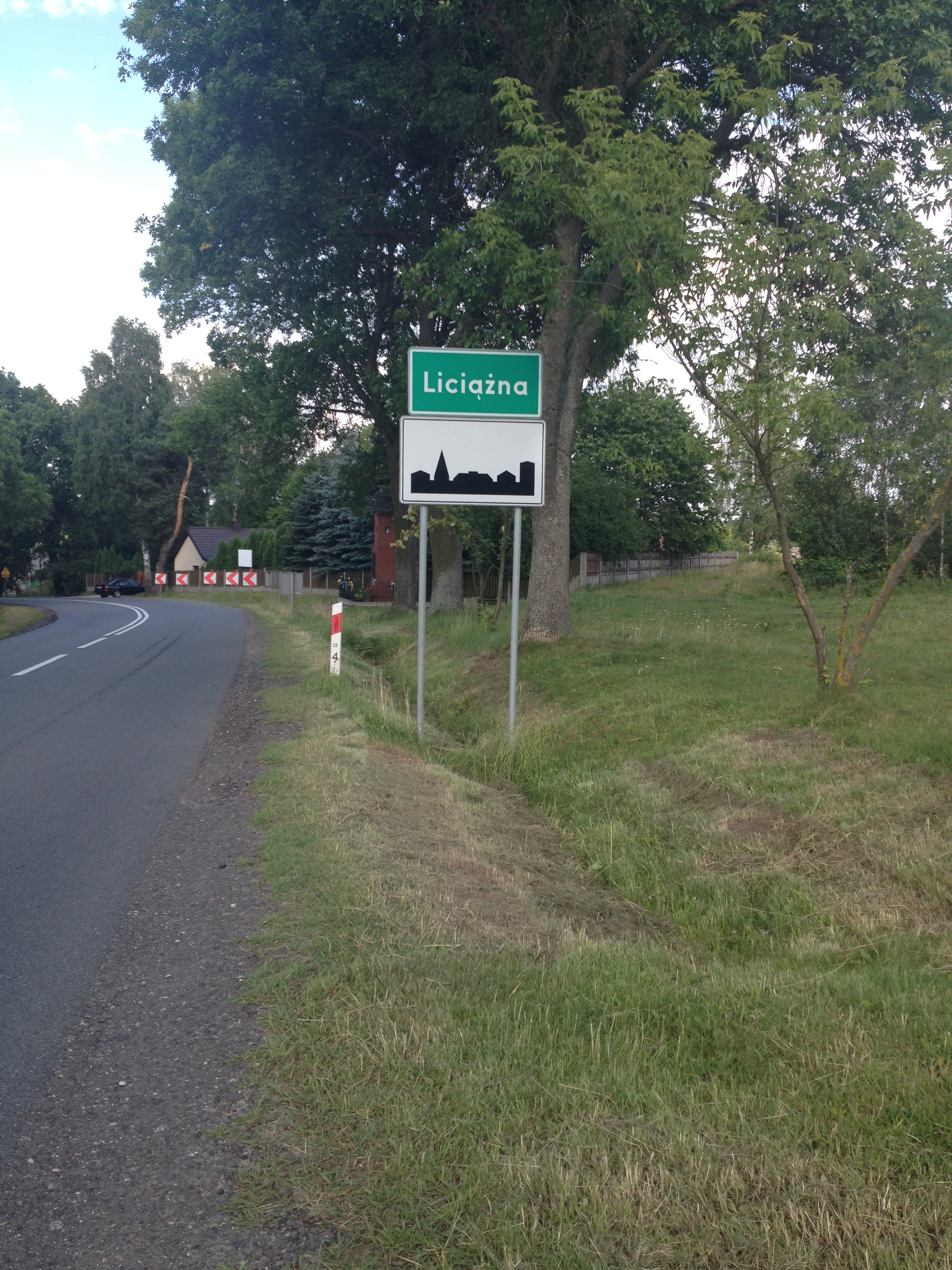

- Location within Poland
- Coordinates: 51°33′20″N 20°15′30″E
- Country: Poland
- Voivodeship: Łódź
- County: Tomaszów
- Gmina: Inowłódz

Liciążna [liˈt͡ɕɔ̃ʐna] is a village in the administrative district of Gmina Inowłódz, within Tomaszów County, Łódź Voivodeship, in central Poland.
