= Konewka, Łódź Voivodeship =

Konewka
- Village
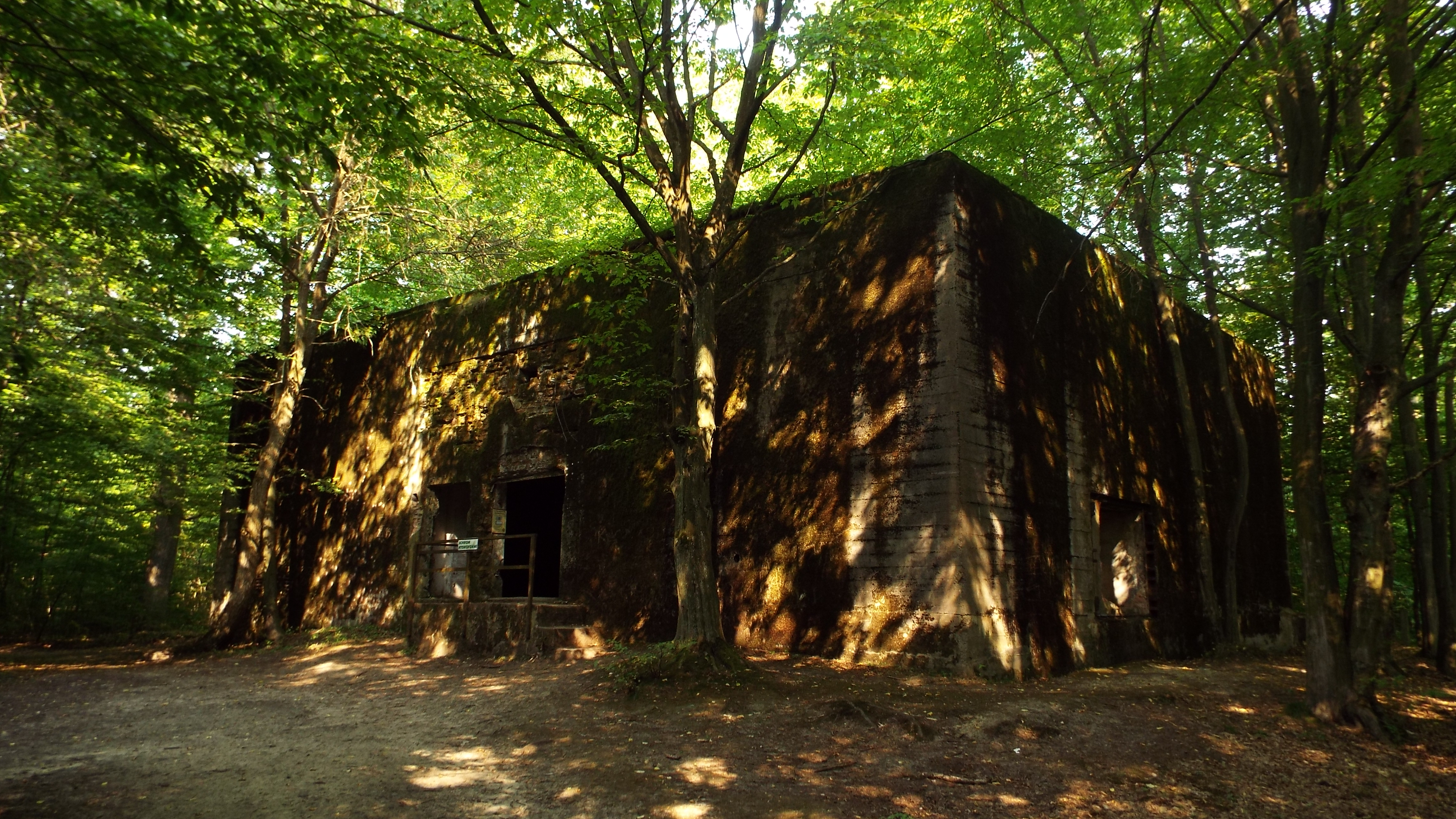
- World War II bunker in Konewka

- Location within Poland
- Coordinates: 51°33′N 20°8′E
- Country: Poland
- Voivodeship: Łódź
- County: Tomaszów
- Gmina: Inowłódz
- Time zone: UTC+1 (CET)
  - Summer (DST): UTC+2 (CEST)
- Vehicle registration: ETM

Konewka [kɔˈnɛfka] is a village in the administrative district of Gmina Inowłódz, within Tomaszów County, Łódź Voivodeship, in central Poland.

There is a preserved bunker complex from World War II in the village, now housing a museum.

== History ==
During the German occupation of Poland (World War II), the occupiers operated a forced labour camp for Poles and Jews at a local sawmill.
