= Przedbórz Synagogue =

Destroyed synagogue in Przedbórz, Poland

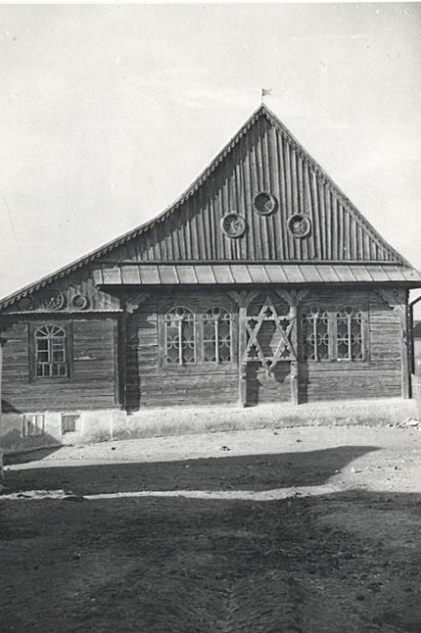
- The former synagogue, in 1909

- Location of the destroyed synagogue in Łódź Voivodeship

Religion
- Affiliation: Judaism (former)
- Ecclesiastical or organizational status: Synagogue (1790–1939)
- Status: Destroyed

Location
- Location: Giełczyńska and Senatorska Streets, Przedbórz, Łódź Voivodeship
- Country: Poland
- Interactive map of Przedbórz Synagogue
- Coordinates: 52°05′14″N 19°52′20″E

Architecture
- Type: Synagogue architecture
- Style: Wooden; Baroque
- Established: 1570 (as a congregation)
- Completed: 1760
- Destroyed: 1939

Specifications
- Length: 14.2 m (47 ft)
- Height (max): 8.8 m (29 ft)
- Materials: Timber

The Przedbórz Synagogue was a former Orthodox Jewish congregation and synagogue, that was located at the southeastern corner of the Main Square, at the intersection of today's Giełczyńska and Senatorska Streets, in Przedbórz, in the Łódź Voivodeship of Poland. Designed as a wooden synagogue and completed in 1760, the synagogue served as a house of prayer until World War II when it was destroyed by Nazis in 1939.

== History ==
A Jewish community is documented to have been established in Przedbórz by 1570. At the beginning of World War II, the town was 60% Jewish.

The building was erected after the previous synagogue burnt down in 1754, completed by 1760, the date given on a wall painting. The building was destroyed in 1939.

== Architecture ==
The synagogue of Przedbórz, regarded as one of Poland's "most beautiful" wooden synagogues, once drew tourists to the small town.

The synagogue, built on a stone foundation, featured a main hall 14.2 m (47 ft) long with a women's balcony above a large vestibule or side hall. The barrel vaulted main hall rose to a height of 8.8 m (29 ft). The wooden, barrel vaulted ceiling was paneled in wood in an intricate lunette and star motif that gave something of the impression of an intricate, curved lattice work. An elaborate, octagonal, Baroque Bimah rose in three tiers almost to the ceiling, but ended in a decorative finial topped by an eagle with wings outspread, and did not touch or support the roof. The Baroque Torah Ark was elaborately carved with lions rampant, floral decorations, and animals.

The walls were elaborately painted with a menorah, an illustration of Psalm 137 featuring trees beside the river of Babylon with musical instruments hanging form the branches, landscapes of towns, the texts of prayers surrounded by garlands of leaves and flowers, and other motifs. High on the north wall a painted legend read, "This is the work of Yehuda Leb's own hands, 1760."

=== Reconstruction project ===
In 2002, Congregation Beth Israel of Berkeley, California, in need of a new building, began a campaign to construct a replica of the Przedbórz Synagogue. The project was abandoned when fundraising fell short.

== Gallery ==
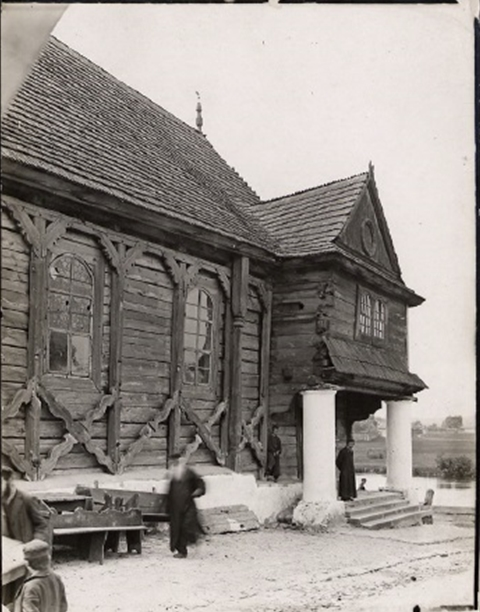
North side

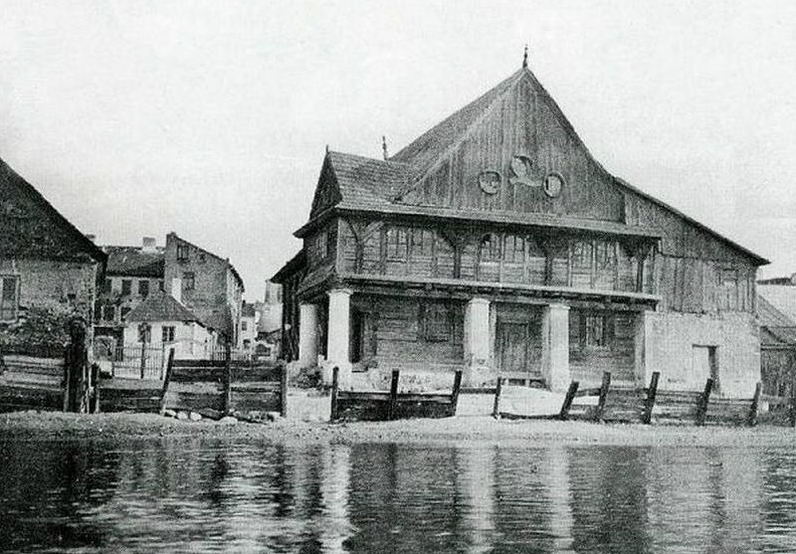
Synagogue as seen from the river Pilica

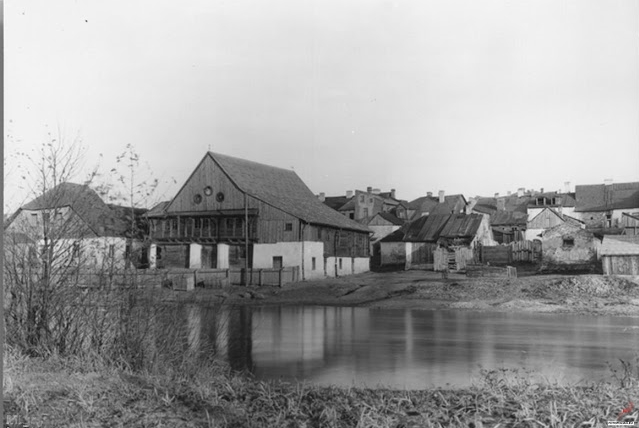
Synagogue as seen from the river Pilica

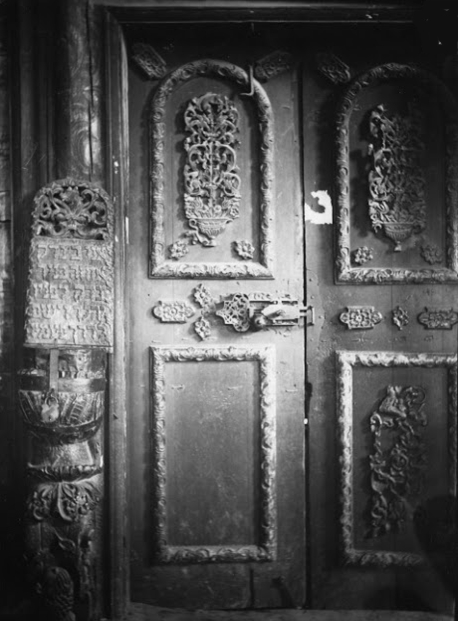
Entrance doors

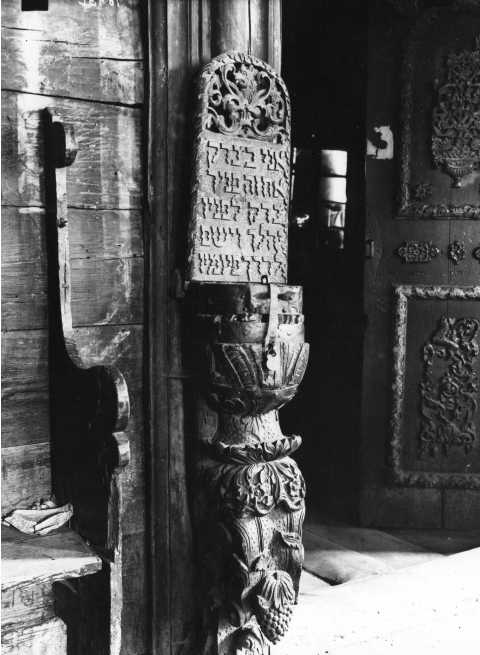
Tzedakah box near the entrance door

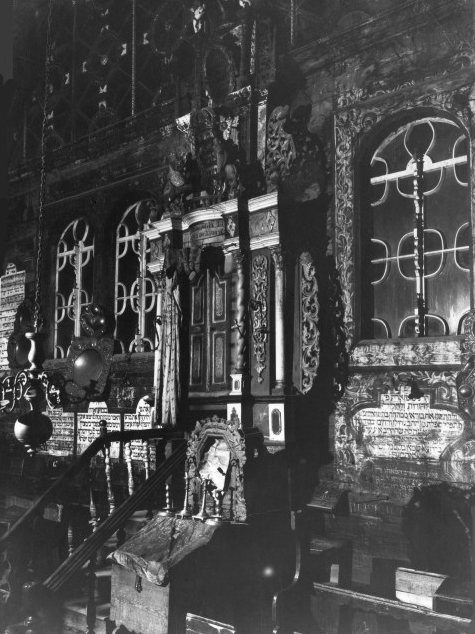
The Torah Ark

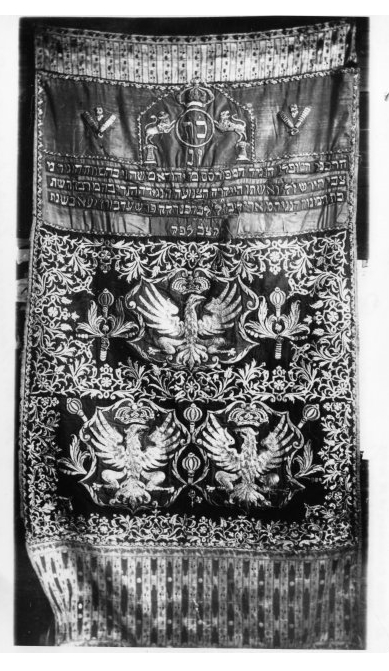
Torah Ark curtain - parochet

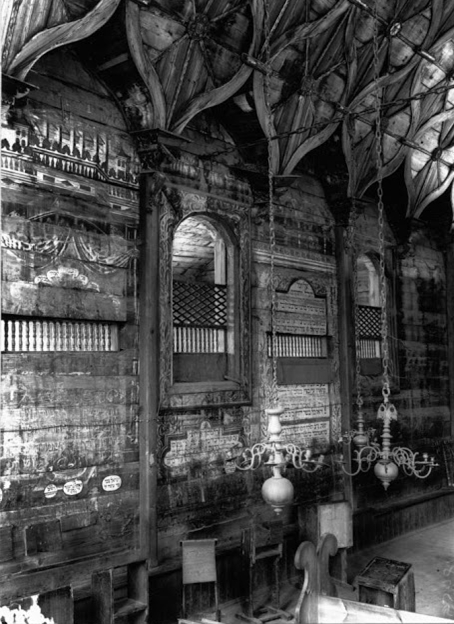
A portion of the wall and ceiling

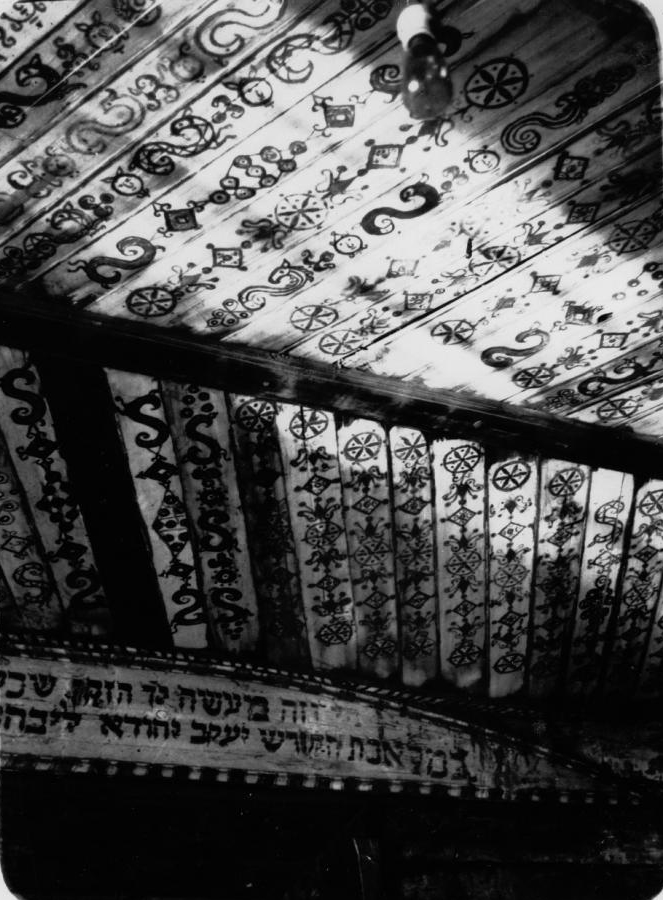
A portion of the painted ceiling

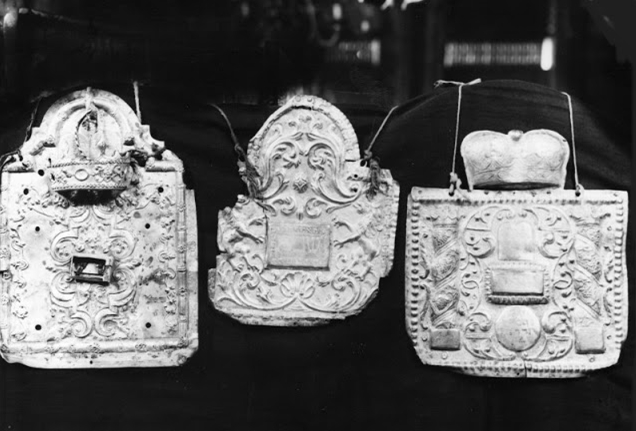
Torah shields

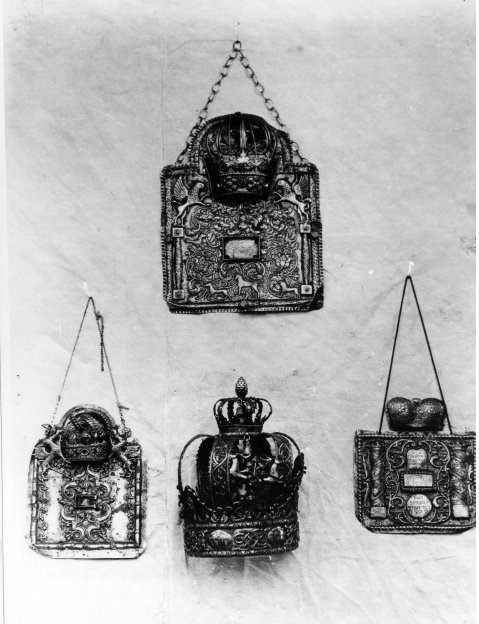
Torah crown and Torah shields

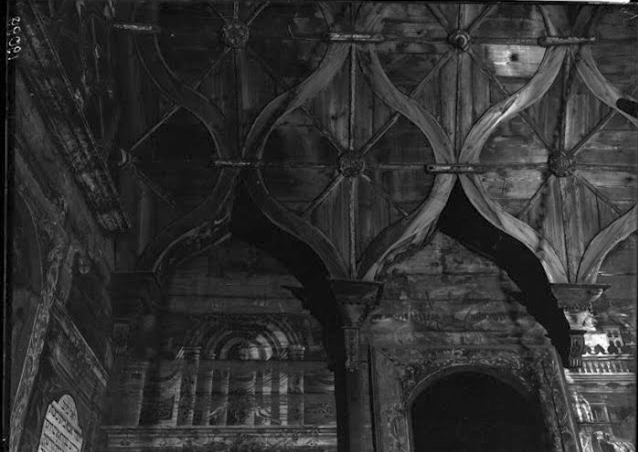
Ceiling

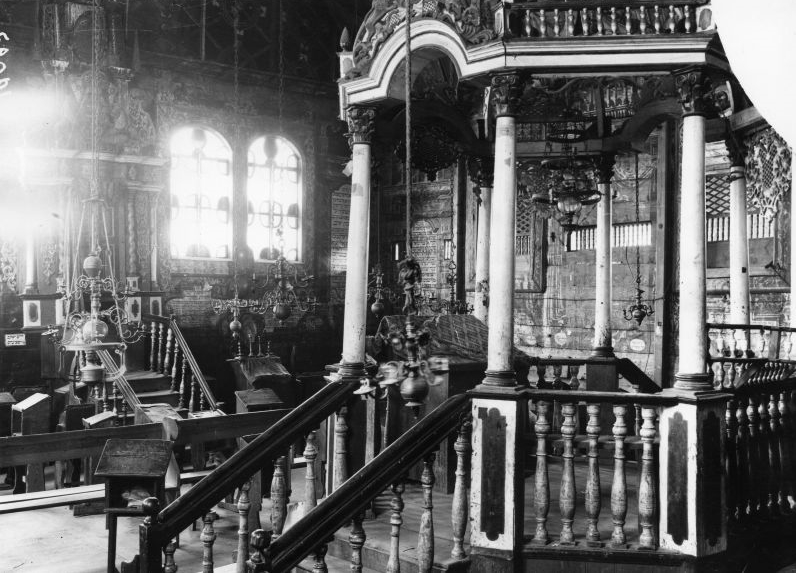
Bimah

== See also ==
- History of the Jews in Poland
- List of active synagogues in Poland
- List of wooden synagogues
