= Niebieskie Źródła Nature Reserve =

Protected area in Tomaszów Mazowiecki, Poland

Coordinates: 51°30′43″N 20°01′40″E

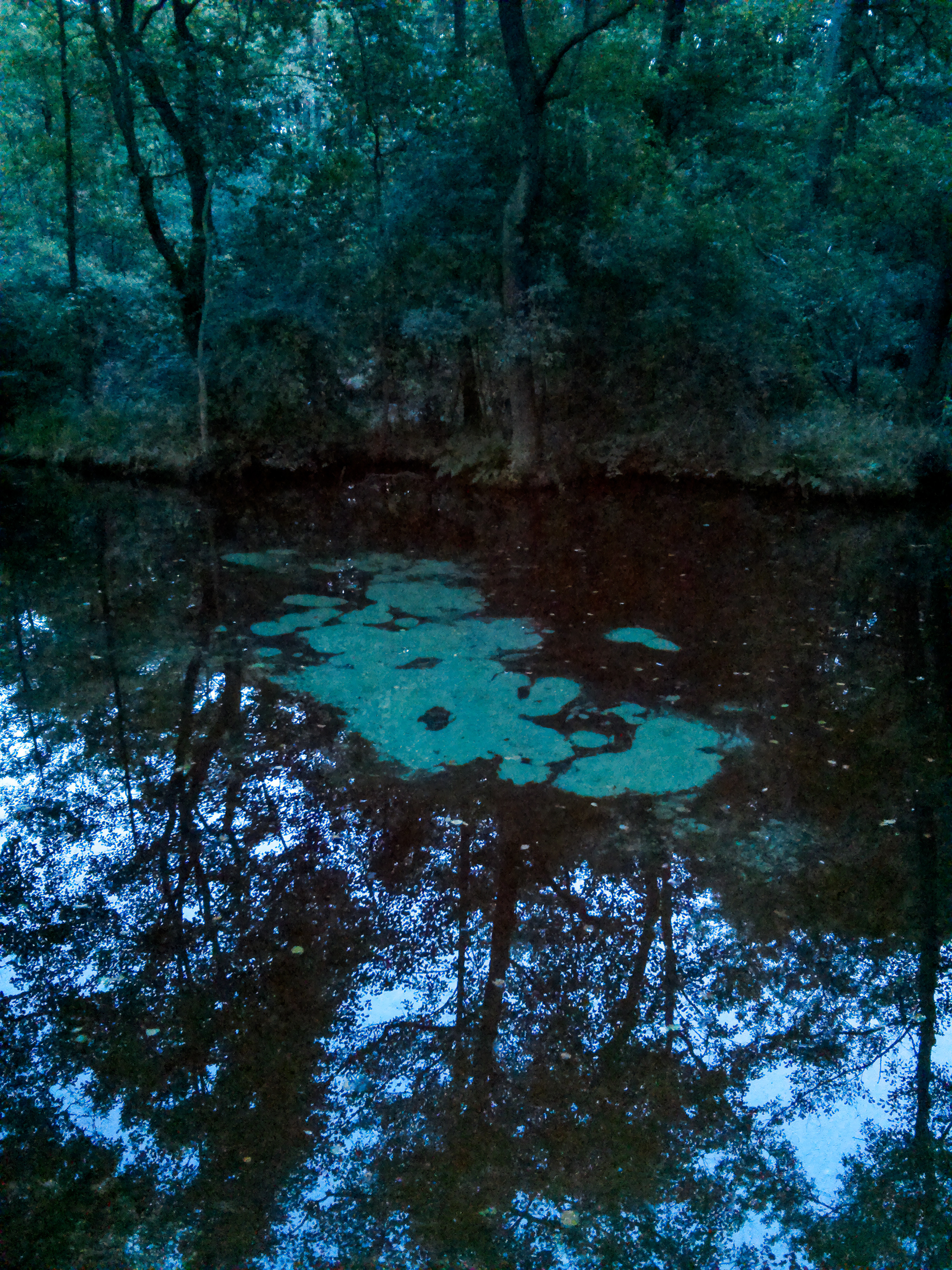
The reserve's most famous pool. Note the sand at the bottom through which water passes, causing a rippling effect.

The Niebieskie Źródła Nature Reserve, or Blue Springs in English, is a nature reserve in Poland in the city of Tomaszów Mazowiecki. It is famous for two pools fed by an underground spring which seem to "shimmer" or "ripple" at the bottom due to the action of entering water. The reserve gets its name from the unusual colour of the water. Spring water absorbs red waves, hence the light, reflected from the bottom, has blue-green colour.

The reserve lies next to the Pilica river and is right next to the Open-air museum of Pilica river. The reserve is home to 75 different species of birds.

== Gallery ==
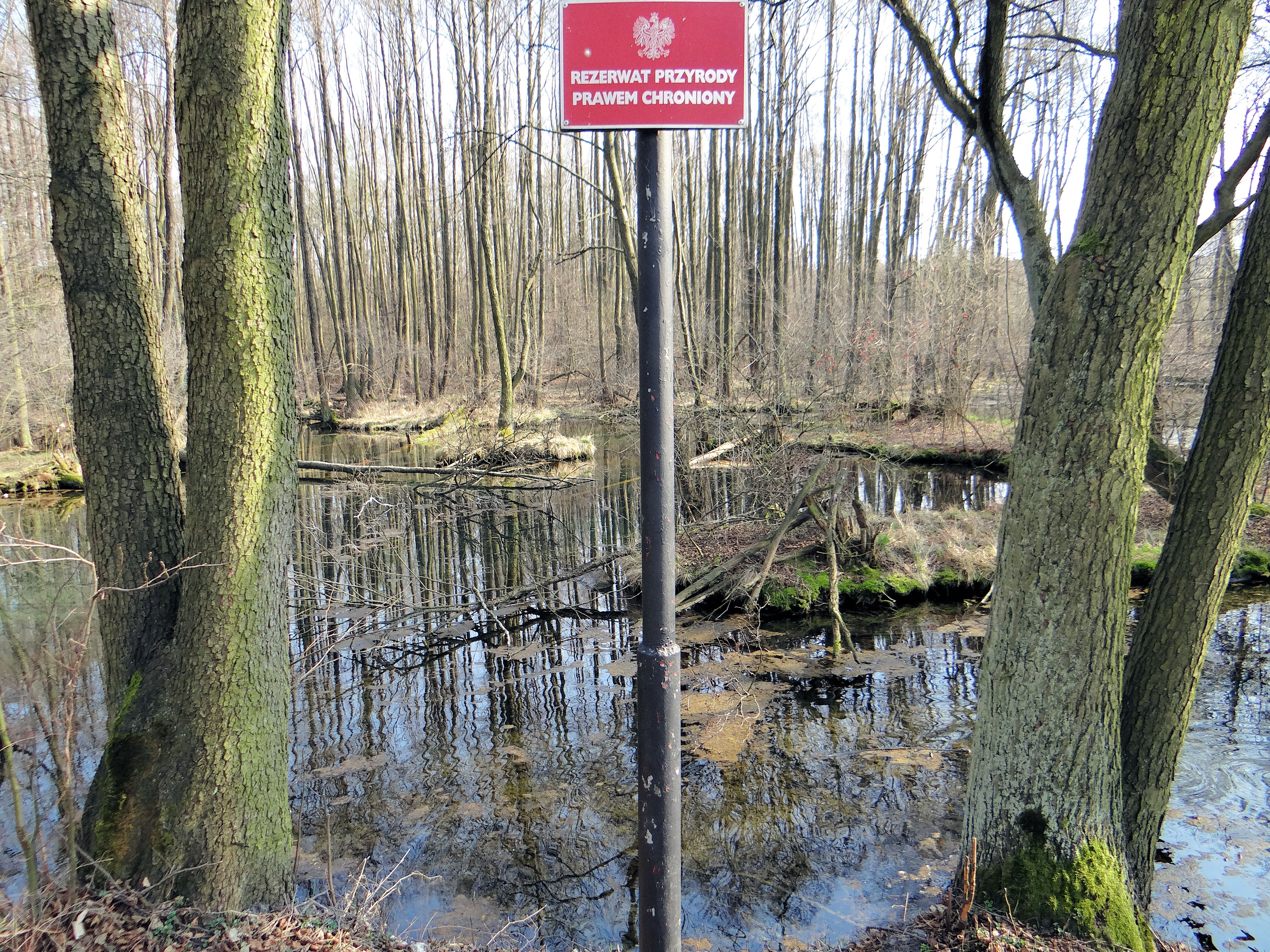

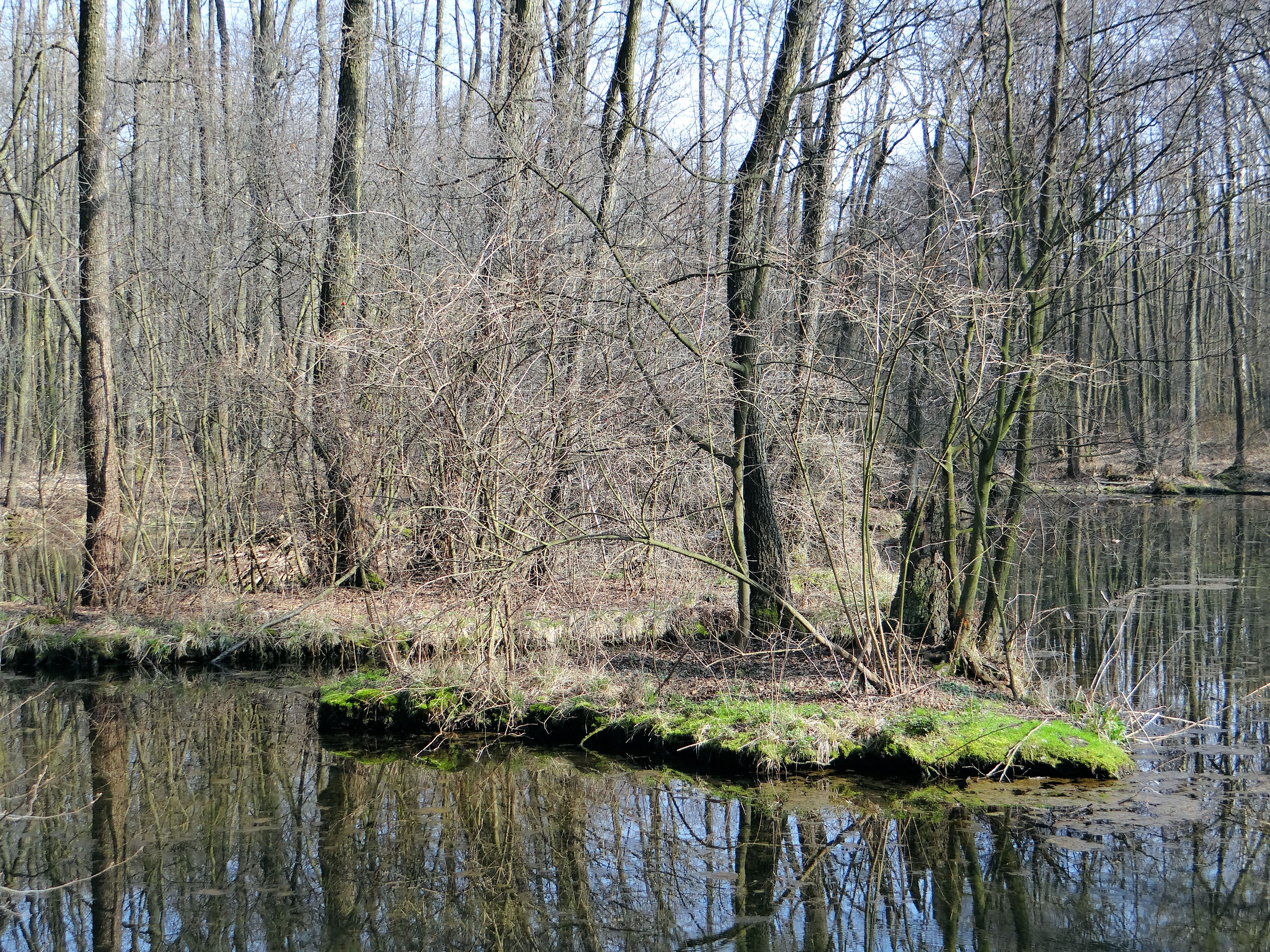

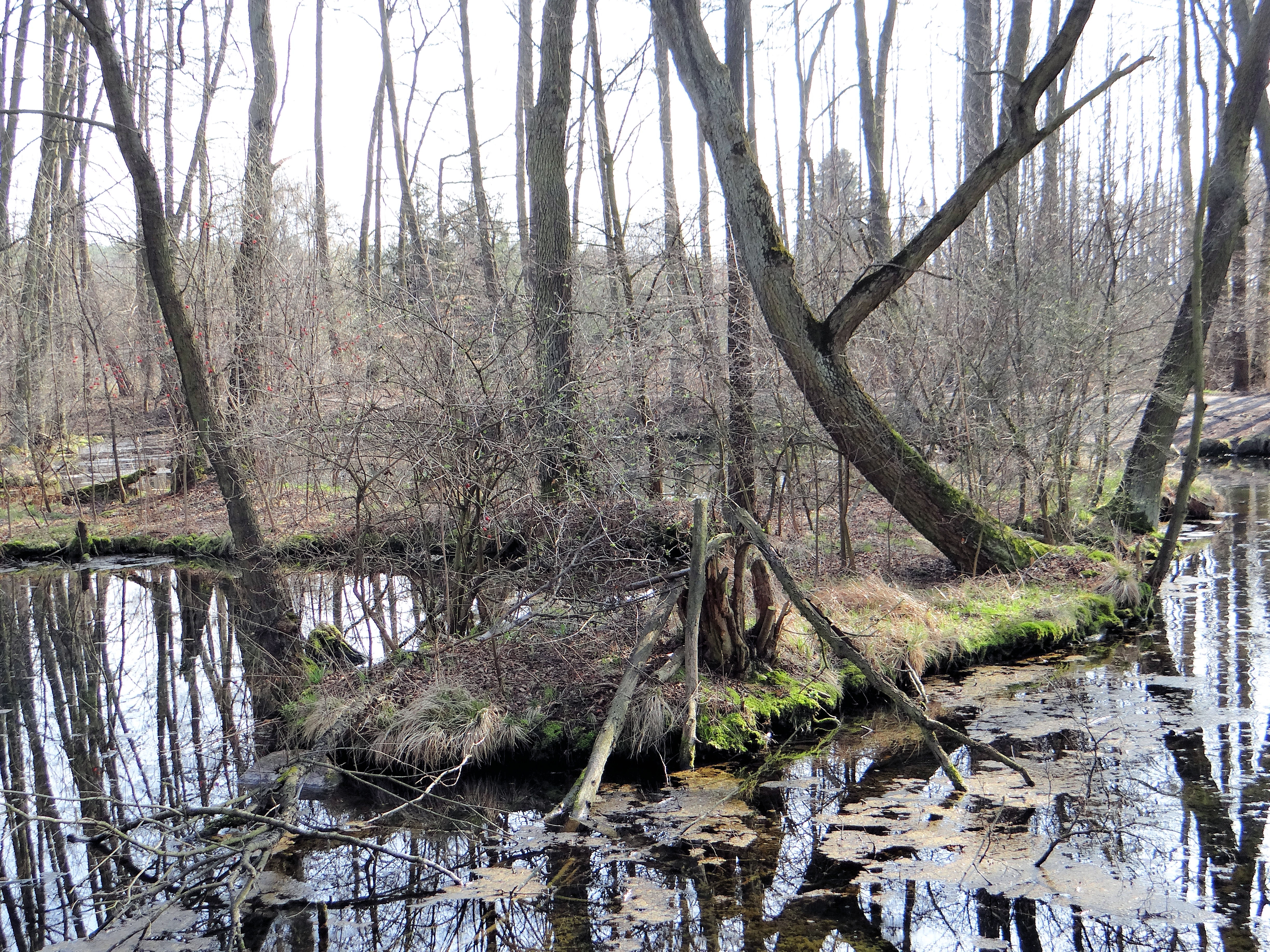

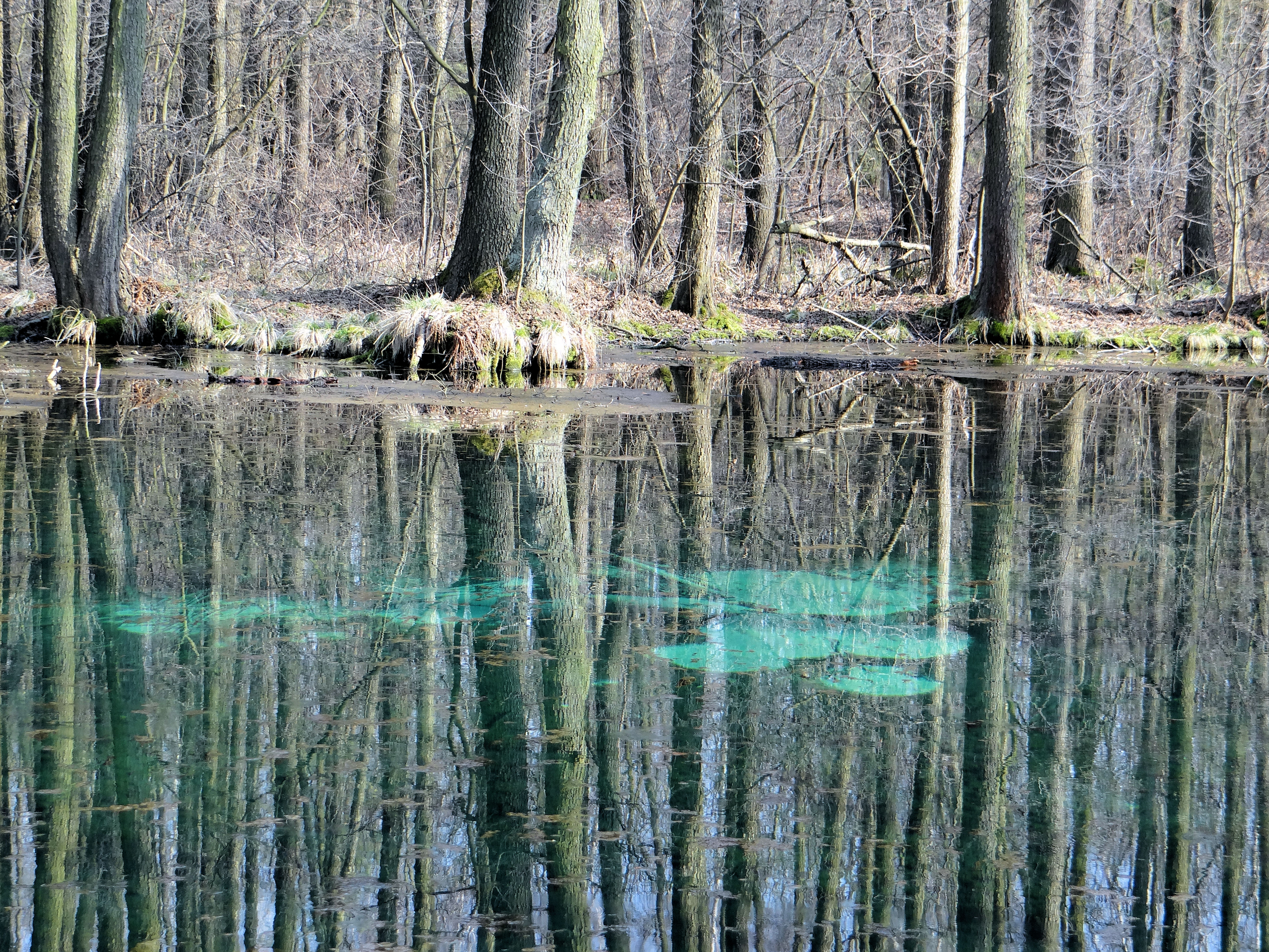

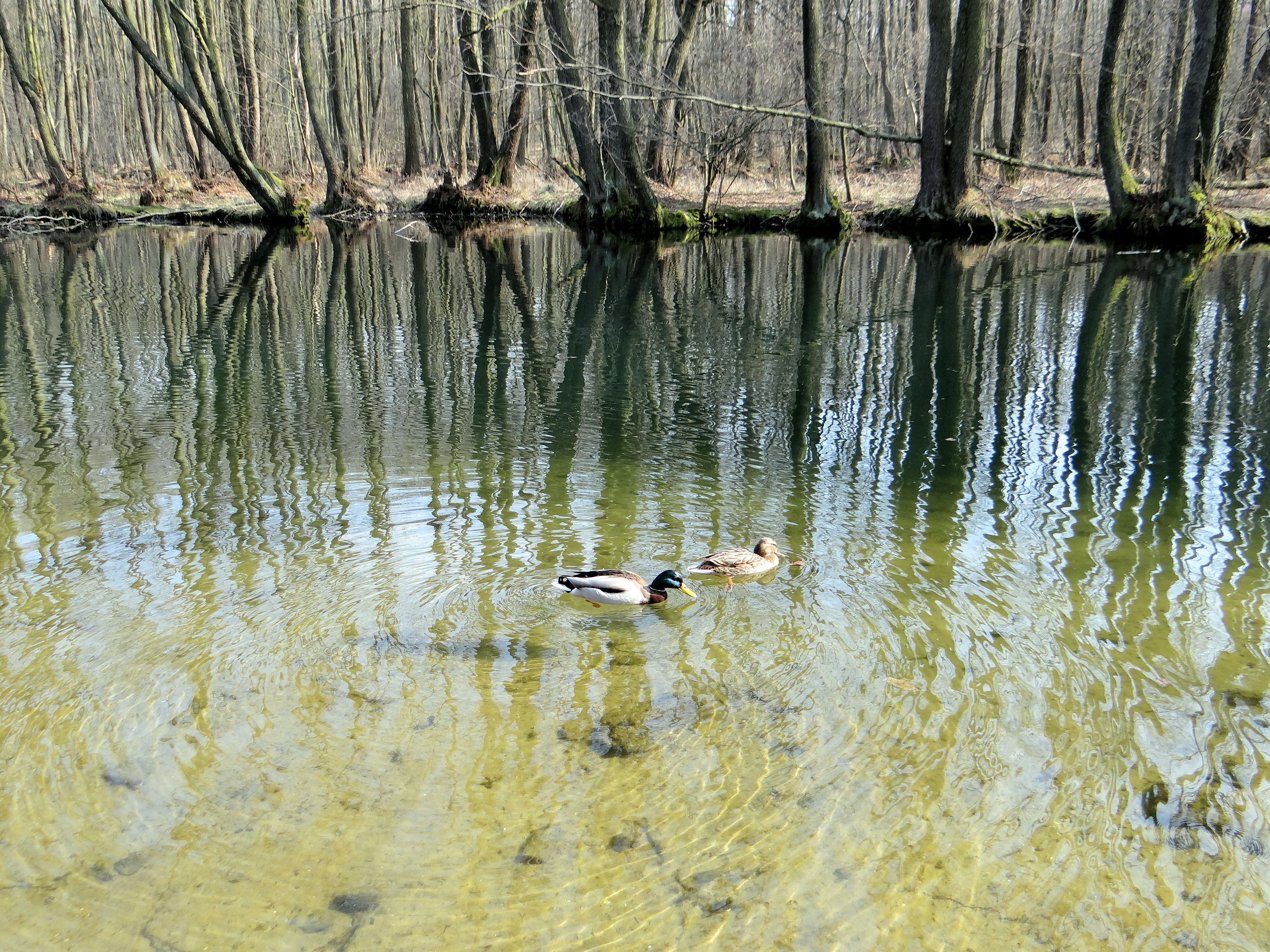

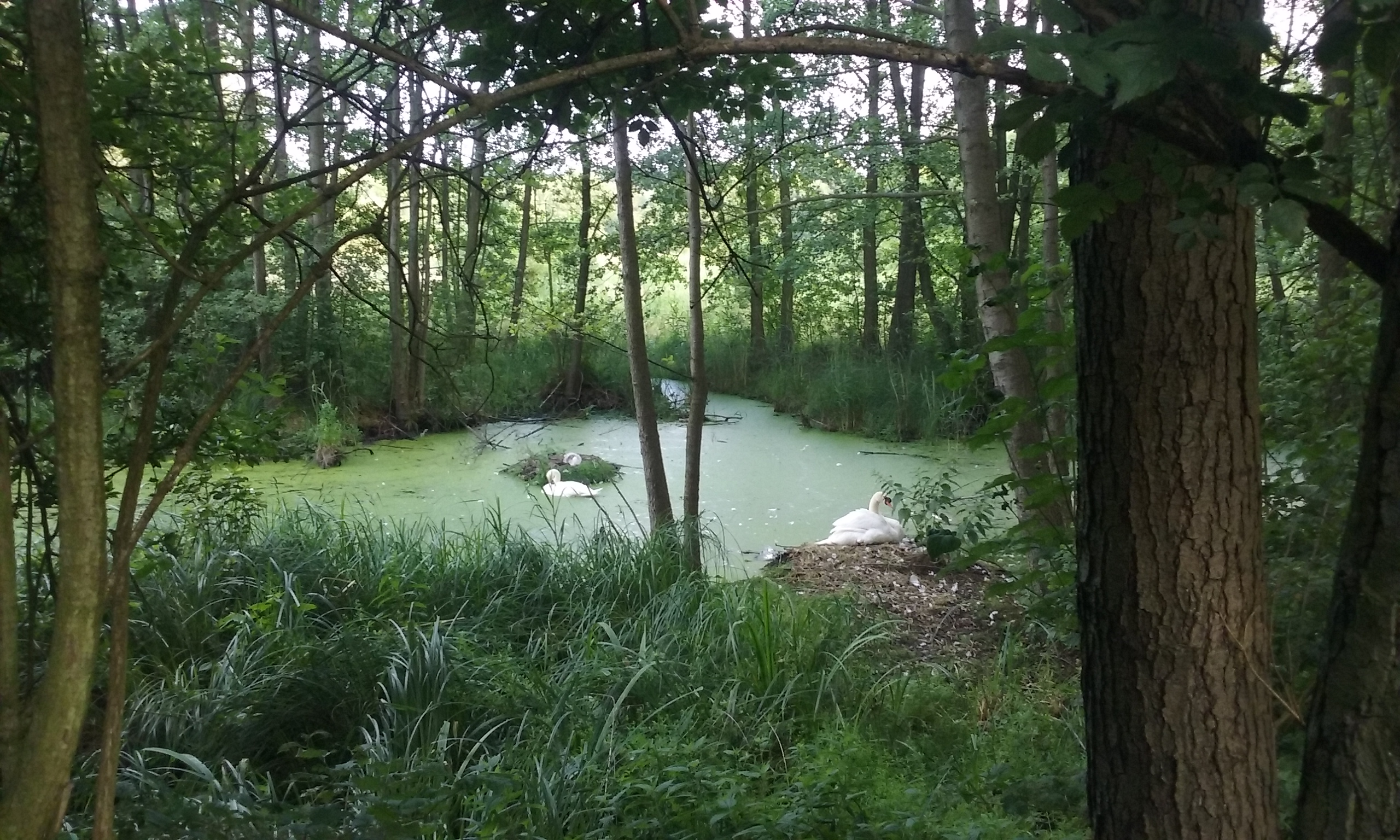
