= Poświętne, Gmina Inowłódz =

Poświętne
- Village
- Location within Poland
- Coordinates: 51°32′59″N 20°12′43″E
- Country: Poland
- Voivodeship: Łódź
- County: Tomaszów
- Gmina: Inowłódz

Poświętne [pɔɕˈfjɛntnɛ] is a village in the administrative district of Gmina Inowłódz, within Tomaszów County, Łódź Voivodeship, in central Poland.
