= Meyer Ryshpan =

Canadian painter and etcher (1898–1985)

- Born: Meyer Ryshpan; September 14, 1898; Przedbórz, Congress Poland
- Died: January 6, 1985 (aged 86); Montreal, Canada
- Occupation(s): Painter, etcher
- Spouse: Daisy Shlefstein (m. 1922)

Meyer Ryshpan (1898–1985) was a Canadian painter and etcher in Montreal.

== Biography and career ==
Rhyspan was born in Przedbórz, Congress Poland, on 14 September 1898. He emigrated to the United States in 1906 and worked on his father's farm for eight years until 1922. He moved to Canada in 1933 and became a painter of genre scenes in Montreal. He was also known for his etchings, some of which were done in colour.

Between 1934 and 1947, Ryshpan exhibited twenty-one works at the Montreal Museum of Fine Arts annual spring exhibitions. In 1944 and 1946, he took part in exhibitions sponsored by the Young Men and Women's Hebrew Associations. In 1955, he was part of a group exhibition at the Eaton's store in Montreal. Ryshpan had a 1958 retrospective at the Jewish Public Library in Montreal, consisting of eighty oil paintings, watercolours, drawings, and etchings. Robert Ayre of the Montreal Star considered his drawings and watercolours to be superior to his oils, and that he was at his best depicting people. Ryshpan died on 6 January 1985 in Montreal.

== Personal life ==
His wife Daisy Shlefstein was also a painter.
