= Przedbórz =

Town in Łódź Voivodeship, Poland

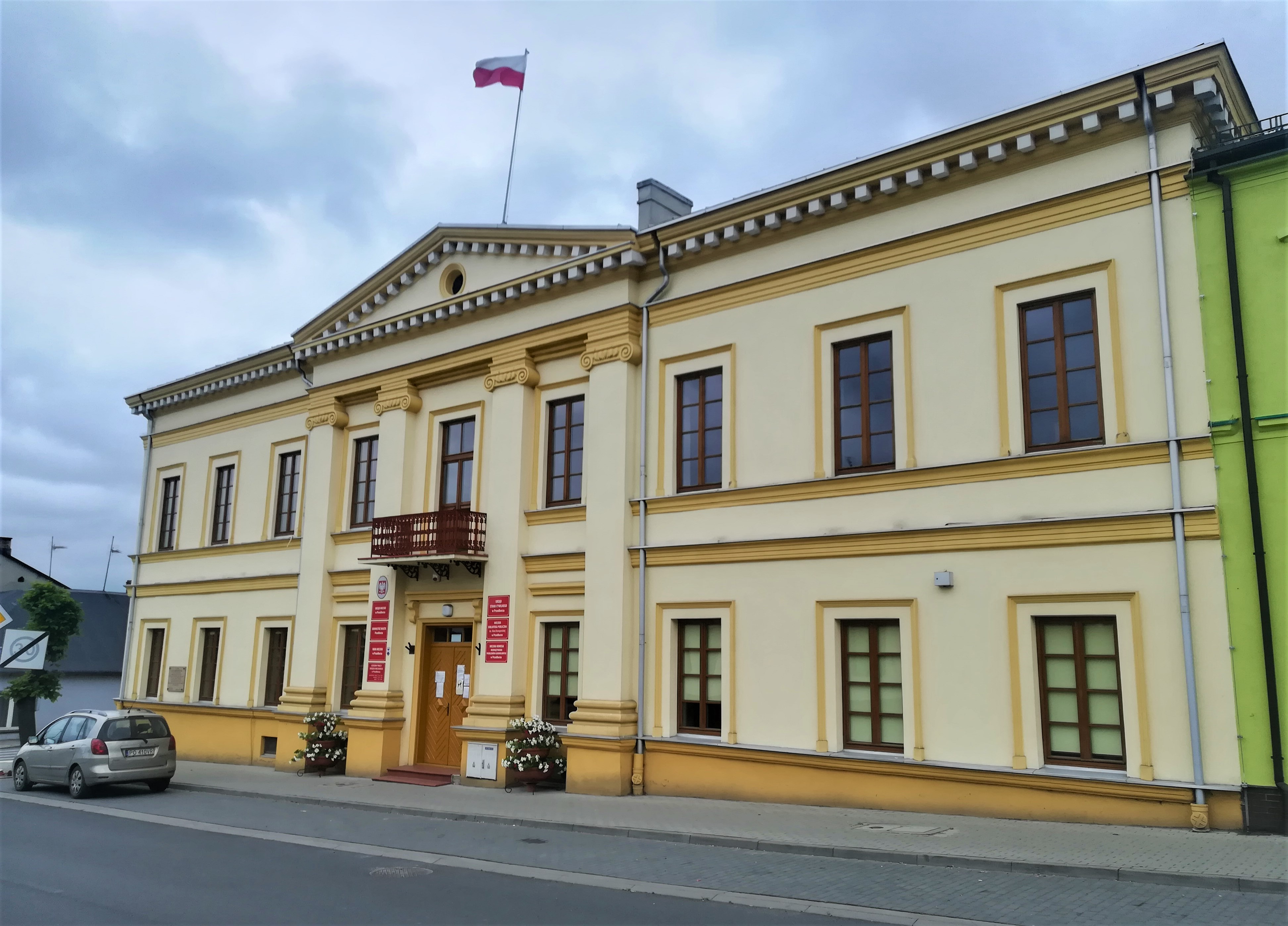
- Town hall

- Coat of arms

- Location within Poland
- Coordinates: 51°5′N 19°53′E
- Country: Poland
- Voivodeship: Łódź
- County: Radomsko
- Gmina: Przedbórz

Government
  - Mayor: Agata Wiśniewska-Pawelak

Area
  - Total: 6.13 km^{2} (2.37 sq mi)

Population (31 December 2020)
  - Total: 3,458 ▼
  - Density: 564/km^{2} (1,460/sq mi)
- Time zone: UTC+1 (CET)
  - Summer (DST): UTC+2 (CEST)
- Postal code: 97-570
- Vehicle registration: ERA
- Website: http://www.przedborz.pl/

Przedbórz [ˈpʂɛdbuʂ] is a town in Radomsko County, Łódź Voivodeship, Poland, with 3,458 inhabitants (2020). Przedbórz is situated on the Pilica River in the northwestern corner of the historic province of Lesser Poland. From its foundation until the Partitions of Poland, it belonged to Lesser Poland’s Sandomierz Voivodeship.

== Etymology ==
The origins of the name of the town are not known. There are two explanations - it either comes from its location przed borem - in front of the wilderness, because in the Middle Ages Przedbórz was surrounded by the vast forests of the Pilica Wilderness and Holy Mountains Wilderness; or from an ancient Slavic first name Przedbor, which was popular in the early Middle Ages (a person named Przedbor might have founded a settlement here).

== History ==
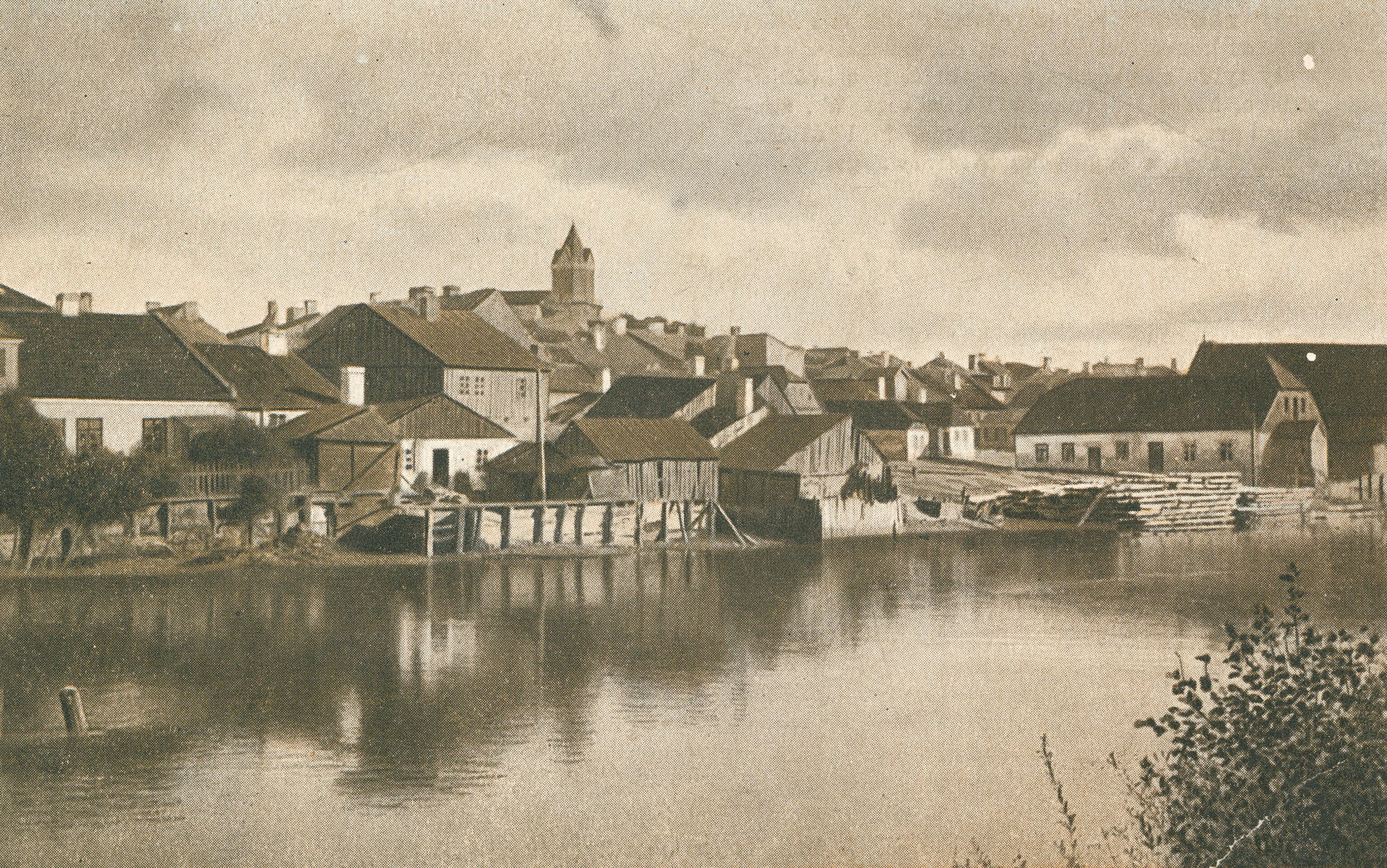
Przedbórz in the 1910s

Przedbórz (known in the past as Predbor, Predbrij, Pridborz, Przedborzs, Przedborze) is first mentioned in documents dating from 1145 as being under the jurisdiction of the Trzemeszno Monastery. King Kazimierz Wielki granted it the status of a city in 1370. He also built a castle, and frequently visited the town during his hunting trips. The Polish king Władysław Jagiełło also visited Przedbórz on several occasions. Przedbórz was a royal town of the Kingdom of Poland, administratively located in the Chęciny County in the Sandomierz Voivodeship in the Lesser Poland Province In 1512, Przedbórz had a school and a large brewery. In 1638, a fire destroyed the town and it was completely destroyed again by the Swedes in 1655 during the Deluge. The 2nd Polish National Cavalry Brigade was stationed in Przedbórz in 1793.

During the Partitions of Poland Przedbórz was a border town for a short period of time when the Austrian - Prussian border was established along the Pilica river in 1795. In 1807 Przedbórz was regained by the Poles and included within the short-lived Duchy of Warsaw, and after its dissolution, it passed to Russian-controlled Congress Poland in 1815. In the 19th century Przedbórz emerged as a local center of industry. In 1823, a cloth factory was opened by Wojciech Lange and a town hall was built in 1838–1840. During the January Uprising a battle between the insurgents and the Russians took place here (June 27, 1863). In the Second Polish Republic, Przedbórz, as part of Końskie County was a part of the Kielce Voivodeship. On the other side of the Pilica river the suburban community of Widoma had 340 residents in 1862. In World War II the area of Przedbórz was a center of resistance where units of Major Henryk Dobrzański were active. On Feb. 10, 1944, the Home Army attacked Przedbórz, destroying several facilities.

Historical population
Year	Pop.
1921	5,885
2010	3,721

A Jewish community is documented as being established in Przedbórz by 1570. At the beginning of the Second World War, the town was 60% Jewish. In the interwar Przedbórz, the Jewish community was considered large. This meant that the commune included the town of Przedbórz, the suburb of Widoma and a number of suburban settlements: Majowa Góra, Chałupki Trzecie, Chałupki Drugie, Miejskie Pola Dzień and Miejskie Pola Drugie. The commune management board was located at 36 Mostowa Street. The commune management board was elected for a 4-year term in general, equal, secret, direct and proportional elections. There are 12 people on the commune's management board. Among them were, among others: Szaja Grynblat, Aron Cukier, Zalcman Szpiro, Szmul Dawid Gotesman, Szyja Niepomieniny, Szlama Rubin, Abram Hersz Landau, Emanuel Woliński, Jankiel Mały, Jakub Szlama. The community owned two synagogues, two school buildings, two steam baths and a cemetery. In the Second Polish Republic in Przedbórz, the rabbi was Nusyn Dawid Grynbaum, and the cantor was Moszek Halper. Before the Second World War, tourists would travel to Przedbórz to visit the architecturally notable Przedbórz Synagogue.

In January 1940, the Germans established a ghetto where they gathered 4,600 Jews. In 1942, the Germans liquidated the ghetto and all Jews were murdered at Treblinka extermination camp. After the war, in 1945, 9 Jews returned to Przedbórz, they were later attacked by antisemitic members of the NSZ. The Jews were tied and taken away in a lorry to a forest in Radoszyce, where they were shot. It is not known if there were other survivors.

A different picture of the crime emerged in a book by Dominik Flisiak published in 2024. The anti-Jewish crime in Przedbórz took place on the night of May 27–28, 1945. The person who directly participated in this attack was Kazimierz Jezierski. In committing the crime, Jezierski was most likely supported by Mieczysław Król, Stefan Hoffman and Jan Marciński. It should be emphasized that some of the perpetrators of the crime had a history of serving in the National Armed Forces. Among these people were: Feliks Sokołowski, Józef Sokołowski and Jan Maciński.

The attackers' motive was anti-Semitism. Their primary goal was to murder Jews who managed to survive World War II. The victims were pre-war inhabitants of this region, i.e. Przedbórz and the immediate vicinity of this town. The victims were not related to supporters of the changes taking place in post-war Poland. These were people who were victims/witnesses of the Holocaust, which was carried out by the Third Reich.

According to the testimony of Dr. Hampel, which is in the resources of Yad-Vashem, shows that 7 Jews were killed in Przedbórz. The victims were: Josel Maszlak, Lejzor Lizband, Becalel Wyszyński, Sara Litwin, Chil Sholem the Immemorial, Izrael Blumenzon, Szlomo Szwarc and Pincze Miedziński. Some of the stolen property was distributed among the gang members. The victims' small possessions consisted mainly of clothes, two old hat making machines, bedding and a bicycle.

Przedbórz gives its name to the nearby protected area known as Przedbórz Landscape Park.

== Points of Interest ==
- Church of Saint Alex (1278), rebuilt in 1341 and 1659.
- Tenement houses from the 18th and 19th centuries.
- Ruins of a 14th-century castle, which was burned in 1655, and abandoned in 1765.

== Transport ==
Przedbórz lies along national road 42 which connects it to Radomsko to the west and to Końskie to the east.

Vovoideship road 742 passes right through the town.

The nearest railway station is in Włoszczowa.

== Notable people ==
- Rabbi Moshe Biderman of Lelov (1776-1851), Rabbi of Przedbórz from 1843 until 1850
- Meyer Ryshpan (1898-1985), Canadian painter
