= Pilica River Skansen =

Coordinates: 51°30′54″N 20°01′49″E

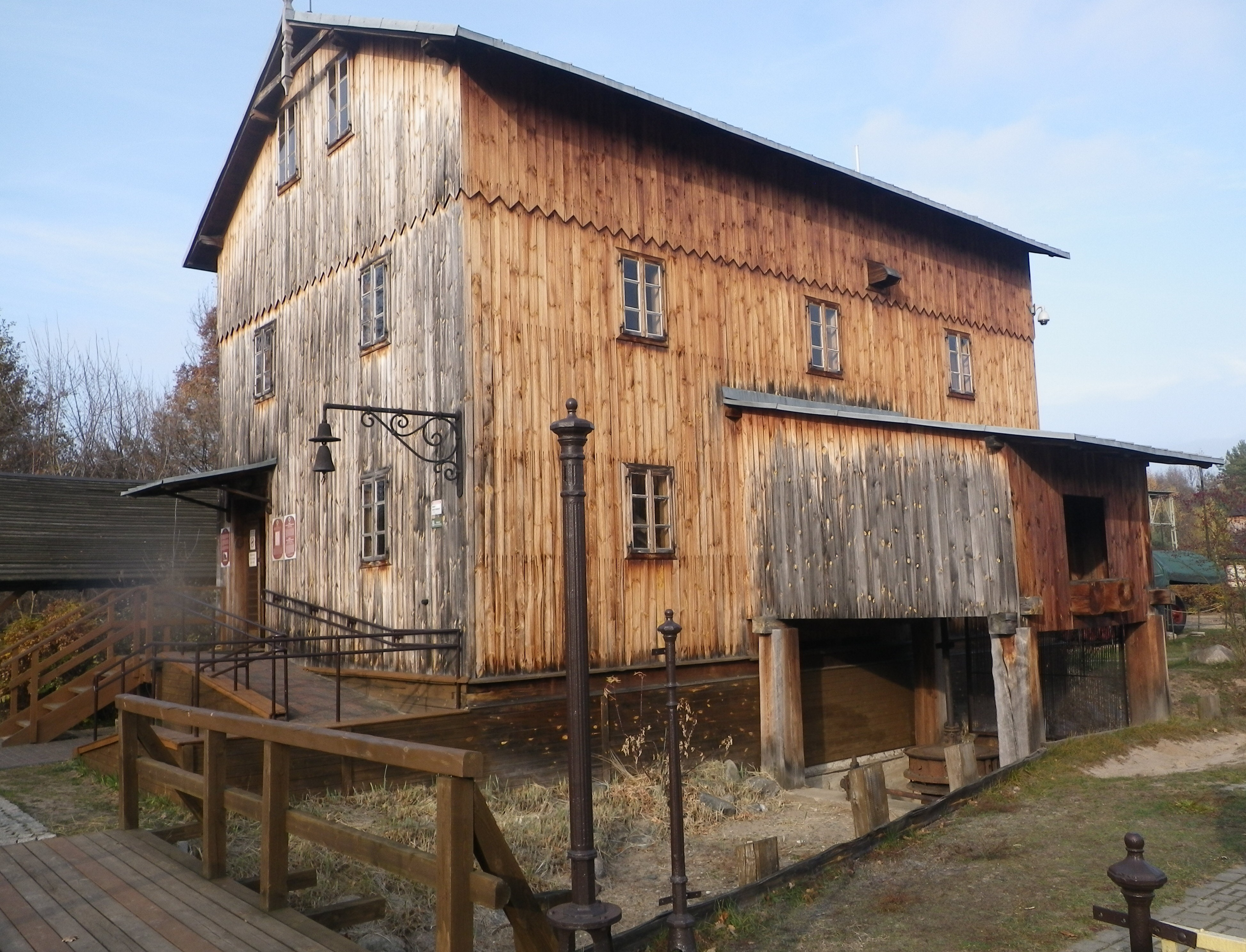
Water mill in Pilica River Skansen

The open-air museum of Pilica river is the first heritage park in Poland dedicated to a river. It is located near the Pilica river in the town of Tomaszów Mazowiecki, Łódź Voivodeship. It was created in 2000. It is located next to the Blue Springs nature reserve.

== History ==
The idea of creating the Pilica open-air museum was first mooted over 20 years ago. The person behind the creation of the museum was its current director Andrzej Kobalczyk. He used to be the chief editor of a monthly magazine "Piotrkow Cultural Guide" ("Piotrkowski Informator Kulturalny") which published materials about this region of the country. Soon the editorial staff of the magazine started to show interest in the Pilica river and the cultural space connected with it. This led to the creation of the "Association of the Pilica's Friends" ("Stowarzyszenie Przyjaciół Pilicy") in 1997. The main purpose of the association was to protect the natural environment of the river and to spread knowledge about the area. The association played a role in forming the open-air museum a few years later.

Over the years, exhibits relating to the Pilica river were collected, with the intention of founding the museum. This included the extraction of German vehicles left over from World War II.

== Museum nowadays ==
The biggest current exhibition is "Water flour-milling in the Pilica river-basin" ("Młynarstwo wodne w dorzeczu Pilicy"). Its most important element is a wooden water-mill. The interior of the construction houses an exhibition about the traditions of water-milling in the area. Besides the mill, there is a gallery with more than 30 millstones. It is the biggest such collection in Poland.

Militaria from the region connected with the Pilica river are gathered in the section "War trophies of Pilica". The exhibits were mainly found at the bottom of the river, as well as in the surrounding area. Exhibits include an artillery tractor belonging to the Luftwaffe. It spent 54 years at the bottom of the Pilica river.

The museum includes exhibits from the nearby town of Spała, which is located on the Pilica river. There is a small building which was a tsarish toilet and also elements of the entrance gate to Spała. Later, all these items from Spała were joined by a guardhouse which was situated beside the President's residence in Spała in the period of the Second Polish Republic.

Through the museum runs the symbolic axle of the Pilica river. Within the territory of the museum there is a hundred-year-old iron barge, an iron engineer boat, as well as a military towing boat and a rescuer's turret.

There is also a railway waiting room building. This wooden building was built in 1896. Over the years the building fell into ruin as it was no longer used at the railway. The local government of Tomaszów Mazowiecki strove to save it and in 2006, following a decision by the provincial conservation office, the building was moved to the open-air museum of Pilica river and reconstructed there.

Temporary exhibitions are presented in the building of a former day-room. Apart from these temporary exhibitions, collections dedicated to rowing and folk boat building are also presented.

The activities of the open-air museum of Pilica river were recognised by the Polish Tourist Organisation in 2005 when the museum was awarded a prize for "the best Polish tourist product of the year". In 2009 the museum was awarded the award "Friendly Bank".
