= Jonathan Uhry Newman =

American attorney and judge

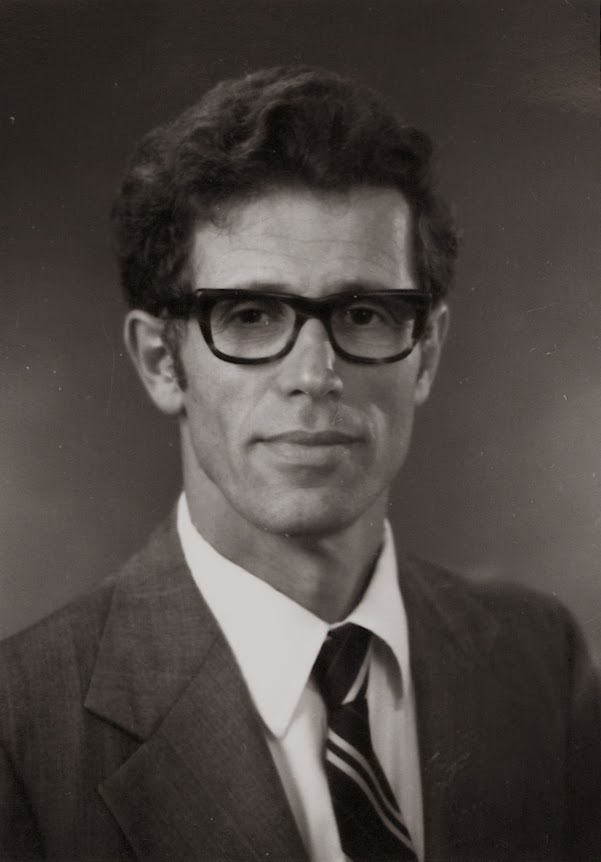
- Born: January 9, 1927; San Francisco, California, United States
- Died: October 24, 1991 (aged 64); Portland, Oregon, United States
- Education: Yale University (BA); Yale Law School (LLB)
- Occupations: Attorney, judge
- Known for: Judge of the Oregon Court of Appeals; civil liberties advocacy
- Spouse: Carol Laura Spero (m. 1951)
- Parent(s): Louis Israel Newman; Lucille Helene Uhry Newman

Jonathan Uhry Newman (January 9, 1927 – October 24, 1991) was an American attorney and judge.

== Biography ==
Newman was born on January 9, 1927, in San Francisco, California, to Rabbi Louis Israel Newman and Lucille Helene (née Uhry) Newman. He attended Ethical Culture Fieldston School and then went on to Yale University, graduating Phi Beta Kappa in 1948. He then attended Yale Law School, graduating in 1951.

In 1951, Newman married Carol Laura Spero (1928-2010), sister of artist Nancy Spero. In 1953, Newman moved to Portland, Oregon, where he practiced law. He was a founding member of the American Civil Liberties Union of Oregon, serving as its first secretary and as a board member between 1955-68. In 1982, the Oregon ACLU awarded him its highest honor, the E.B. MacNaughton Civil Liberties Award.

From 1968-79, he served on the Portland school board and was "a driving force behind desegregating the schools". In 1982, he was elected to the Oregon Court of Appeals where he served until 1991. On October 24, 1991, Newman died of leukemia in Portland, Oregon, aged 64.

He routinely hiked on the weekends throughout the 1950s until his death and Newman's memorial service was held at the base of the Topspur Trailhead (#785) in the Mount Hood National Forest where his friends dedicated a plaque. It sits on a stone at the beginning of the trail as of August 2016.

== Legacy ==
The annual Jonathan U. Newman Legal Citizen of the Year Award given by Classroom Law Project to recognize leadership in civic education and engagement is named after Judge Newman.
