= Congregation Beth Israel (Berkeley, California) =

Orthodox synagogue in Berkeley, California

- Hebrew: בית ישראל

- Location in Berkeley

Religion
- Affiliation: Modern Orthodox Judaism
- Ecclesiastical or organisational status: Synagogue
- Leadership: Rabbi Yonatan Cohen; Rabbanit Dr. Meira Wolkenfeld
- Status: Active

Location
- Location: 1630 Bancroft Way, Berkeley, California
- Country: United States
- Coordinates: 37°51′58″N 122°16′40″W

Architecture
- Established: 1909 (as a congregation)
- Completed: 1924 (Bancroft & Jefferson); 2005 (Bancroft Way)

Specifications
- Capacity: 176
- Materials: Cement façade; Western red cedar roof

Website
- cbiberkeley.org

Congregation Beth Israel (Hebrew: בית ישראל) is a Modern Orthodox synagogue in Berkeley, California, United States. Established in 1924 as the Berkeley Hebrew Center, it traces its origins to the First Hebrew Congregation of Berkeley, founded in 1909. It was Berkeley's first synagogue and remains its oldest. Lay-led for four decades, it hired its first rabbi, Saul Berman, in 1963.

Berman served until 1969, and was succeeded by Yosef Leibowitz, who served for 15 years. During the 1980s and early 1990s Beth Israel was at the vanguard of the baal teshuva movement in Modern Orthodox Judaism.

In 1999 the congregation began an $8 million fund-raising campaign to build a new synagogue, a replica of the Przedbórz Synagogue, destroyed in Poland by the Nazis, during the Holocaust in 1942. Difficult economic times restricted fundraising efforts, and instead the congregation completed a more modest structure in 2005. As of 2022, the rabbi was Yonatan Cohen.

== Early years ==
Congregation Beth Israel was established as the Berkeley Hebrew Center at 1630 Bancroft Way, the first, and still-oldest synagogue in Berkeley, California. Though the cornerstone was laid in 1924, the congregation traces its roots back to 1909, when Martin Meyer, rabbi of San Francisco's Congregation Emanu-El, founded the First Hebrew Congregation of Berkeley. From 1913 to 1916 Meyer's disciple Louis Israel Newman served as rabbi. During this period, small groups of Jews would rent space above stores in downtown Berkeley for Shabbat and holiday services. In 1924, under the name "Berkeley Hebrew Center", members of the First Hebrew Congregation of Berkeley built their first permanent home at the corner of Bancroft and Jefferson Streets.

Though during its first decades the synagogue was lay-led, in its early years it received significant guidance and support from Meyer and Newman, both Reform rabbis. Nevertheless, the congregation was quite traditional; the kitchen was kosher, members covered their heads, the traditional prayer book was used. While the Friday night services "resembled Reform practice... the High Holiday services were clearly closer to Orthodox practice."

== Post–World War II growth ==
In the 1950s and 1960s Beth Israel benefited from an influx of students and faculty from University of California, Berkeley. Many of the graduate students had grown up in Orthodox homes, and many of the faculty were becoming more observant. These new members organized Shabbat services, and "pressed for the hiring of a rabbi". In 1963 Beth Israel decided to hire its first rabbi, an Orthodox one, and chose Saul Berman, who had been ordained by the Modern Orthodox Yeshiva University. Berman increased levels of observance in the organization, and turned the sometimes sporadic Sunday school into a more educationally rigorous three-times-a-week Hebrew school. This in turn attracted new families to the congregation. Berman would serve until 1969, and go on to become "a leading voice of modern Orthodoxy."

Berman was succeeded by Yosef Leibowitz; Beth Israel was his first pulpit. Leibowitz would serve for fifteen years, before moving to Israel in 1984, and was succeeded first by Joseph Ozarowski, then by Manny Forman. During this period Beth Israel became one of the "flagship" synagogues of baal teshuva movement in Modern Orthodoxy, the adoption of Orthodox observance by "highly educated, prosperous, professional young people, mainly from non-Orthodox backgrounds, and often with meager Jewish educations".

Eliezer Finkelman served as rabbi from 1992 to 2000, before moving to the East Coast of the United States. He was succeeded by Yair Silverman, a Montreal native who had lived in Israel for five years, and served in the Israel Defense Forces for a year, before being ordained by Yeshiva University in 1999.

Plaques at the front entrance

== New building ==
In 1999 the congregation began a campaign to construct new building; the old building had only one room, a very low ceiling, no air conditioning, and was "seismically unsafe". The plan was to build a replica of the Przedbórz Synagogue in Poland, considered to be among the most beautiful of the Polish–Lithuanian wooden synagogues, and burned down by the Nazis in 1942. Costs had initially been budgeted at $8 million, but fundraising was slowed by collapse of the dot-com bubble and the economic effects of the September 11 attacks. The project was scaled back to $3.5 million in 2002, and then abandoned in March 2003, after only $2 million was raised.

Earlier that year, in January, the congregation acquired its first new Torah scroll in its 75-year history, at a cost of $40,000. The synagogue already had three Torah scrolls, but they had been acquired used in the 1950s. Though repaired over time, "due to wear and tear" they were becoming unusable.

The following year construction began on a new building that looked similar to the previous one. During its construction, which was on the existing lot, services were held in various temporary locations. Completed in 2005, the design included a replica of the Przedbórz synagogue's "intricately carved" wooden charity box, and wooden floors and ceilings. While the façade was cement, the roof, almost 30 feet (9.1 m) high, was constructed of western red cedar. The sanctuary had seating for 176 people, and the back wall separating the sanctuary from the social hall could be raised by a pulley system, creating one large combined room. At the time, the congregation had 165 member families.

== Recent events ==
Silverman returned to Israel in 2006, and was replaced by Yonatan Cohen. Cohen, a native of Israel who grew up outside Tel Aviv, had moved with his family to Montreal when he was 10. Though his parents were not observant, Cohen became more-so, aligning first with the Conservative movement, and then studying at the Orthodox Yeshivat Chovevei Torah in New York City, headed by Rabbi Avi Weiss.

Rabbi Max Davis, a 2008 graduate of Yeshivat Chovevei Torah, joined the congregation that year as rabbinic educator. He earned his master's degree in Jewish education from Yeshiva University in 2009, and in August 2010 he moved to Congregation B'nai Torah of Springfield, Massachusetts.

As of 2019, the rabbi was Yonatan Cohen. Rabbanit Dr. Meira Wolkenfeld serves as the Director of Education and Community Engagement.
