= Królowa Wola, Łódź Voivodeship =

Królowa Wola
- Village
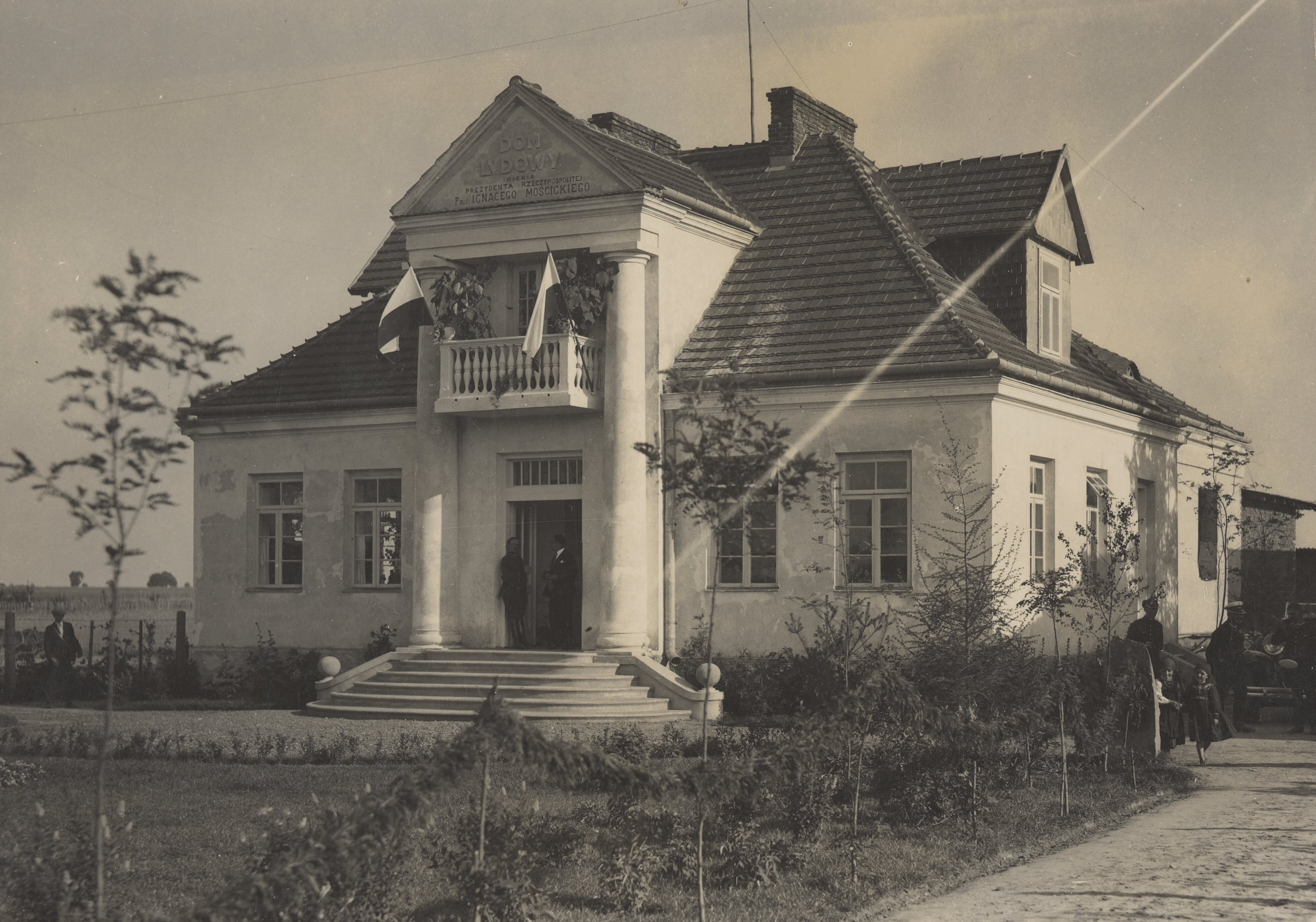
- Community center, after 1929

- Location within Poland
- Coordinates: 51°33′9″N 20°10′45″E
- Country: Poland
- Voivodeship: Łódź
- County: Tomaszów
- Gmina: Inowłódz

Królowa Wola [kruˈlɔva ˈvɔla] is a village in the administrative district of Gmina Inowłódz, within Tomaszów County, Łódź Voivodeship, in central Poland.
