= Zarzecze, Zawiercie County =

Zarzecze
- Village
- Location within Poland
- Coordinates: 50°28′8″N 19°39′54″E
- Country: Poland
- Voivodeship: Silesian
- County: Zawiercie
- Gmina: Pilica

Zarzecze [zaˈʐɛt͡ʂɛ] is a village in the administrative district of Gmina Pilica, within Zawiercie County, Silesian Voivodeship, in southern Poland.
