= Żądłowice =

- Village
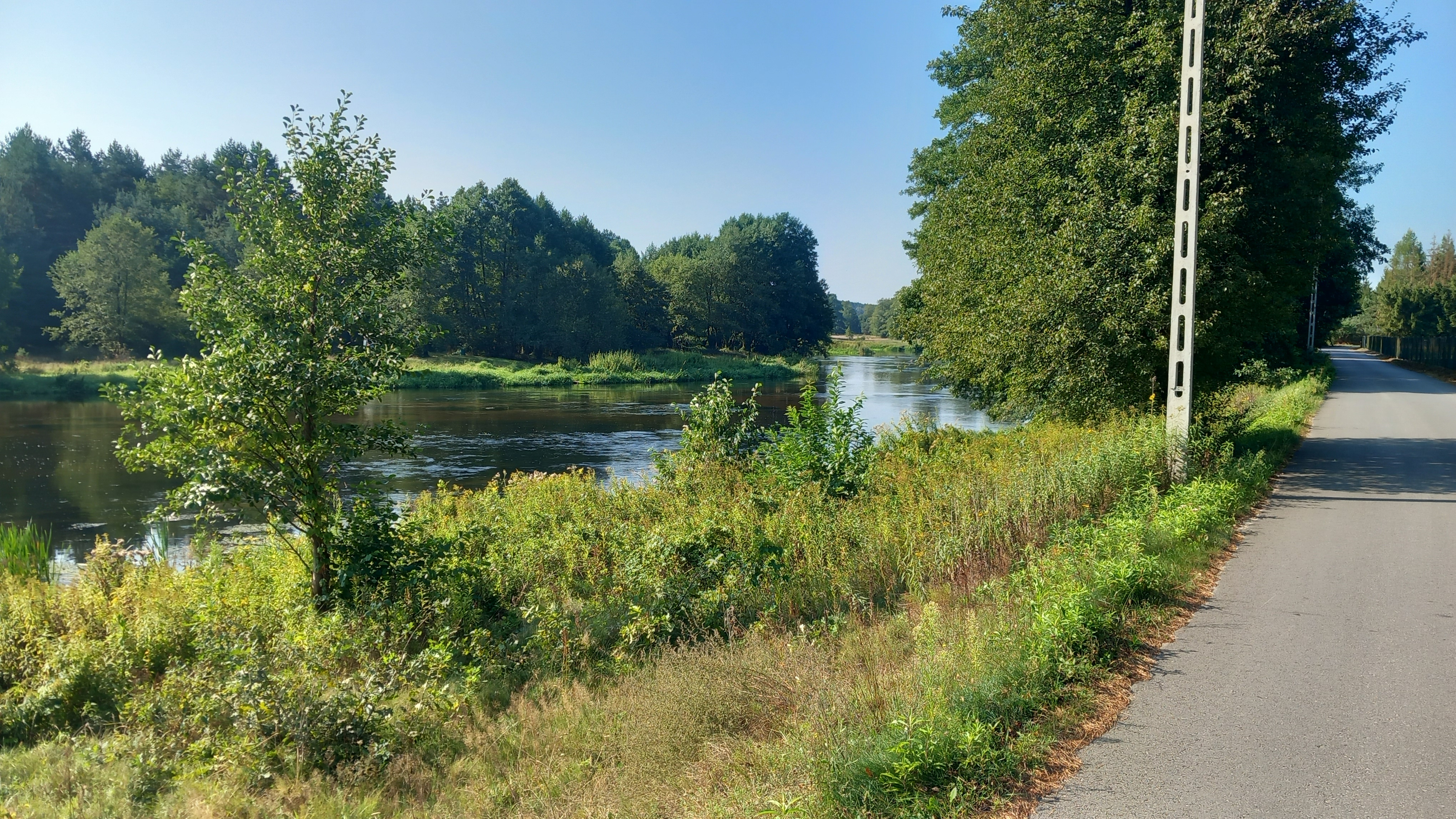

- Location within Poland
- Coordinates: 51°33′N 20°16′E
- Country: Poland
- Voivodeship: Łódź
- County: Tomaszów
- Gmina: Inowłódz
- Population: 190

Żądłowice [ʐɔndwɔˈvit͡sɛ] is a village in the administrative district of Gmina Inowłódz, within Tomaszów County, Łódź Voivodeship, in central Poland.
