= Boleścin =

Boleścin may refer to the following places in Poland:

- Boleścin in Gmina Świdnica, Świdnica County in Lower Silesian Voivodeship (SW Poland)
- Boleścin in Gmina Trzebnica, Trzebnica County in Lower Silesian Voivodeship (SW Poland)
