= Salo Landau =

Dutch chess player (1903–1944)

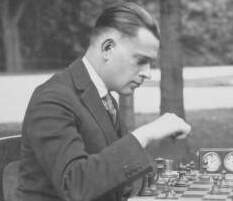

Personal information
- Born: 1 April 1903 Bochnia, Galicia, Austria-Hungary
- Died: March 1944 (aged 40) Świdnica County

Chess career
- Country: Netherlands

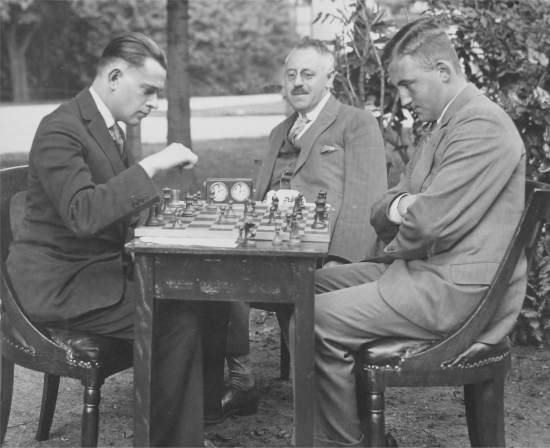
Salomon Landau vs. Johannes Hendrik Otto count van den Bosch (1906-1994), c. 1930

Salo (Salomon) Landau (1 April 1903, Bochnia, Galicia, Austria-Hungary – March 1944, Grodziszcze, Świdnica County, Poland) was a Dutch chess player, who died in a Nazi concentration camp.

== Biography ==
=== Early life ===
Salo was born into a Jewish family in Bochnia, Poland (then Galicia, Austria-Hungary). In 1914 (World War I), the Landau family fled to Vienna, and young Salo was sent to friends in Rotterdam in the Netherlands.

=== Chess career ===
For some years, he was the Dutch number two, behind Max Euwe.

In July 1924, Landau took 4th at Antwerp. In May 1926, he tied for 4th–5th at Scarborough. In 1926/27, he took 7th at Hastings (Reserve Tournament). In 1927, he finished 2nd to Richard Réti, at The Hague. In 1927, Landau lost a match against Réti at Rotterdam (+1 –5 =0). In 1927, he tied for 4 th-6 th at 's-Hertogenbosch. In July 1927, he tied for 2nd–3rd at London (Reserve). In 1927/28, he took 3rd at Hastings (Reserve). In 1928, he tied for 3rd–4th at Amsterdam. In 1928, he took 2nd, behind Henri Weenink, at Amsterdam (Dutch Chess Championship). In December 1928, he took 2nd, behind van den Bosch, at The Hague. In 1928, he tied for 1st with van den Bosch at Zwolle. In 1928/29, he tied for 2 nd-3rd with Pitschak, behind Ludwig Rellstab, at Hastings (Reserve B). In February 1929, he took 3rd at Maastricht. In July 1929, he tied for 2nd–3rd with Weenink, behind Euwe, at Amsterdam (8th Dutch championship). In 1929, he tied for 2nd–3rd at The Hague. In 1929/30, he won at Hastings (Reserve B). In February 1930, he tied for 3rd–4th at Amsterdam. In 1930, he took 4th at Antwerp. In August 1930, he came fourth and last at Rotterdam (Quadrangular).

Landau had one outstanding result at Rotterdam in 1931, where he finished 1st ahead of Edgard Colle, Savielly Tartakower, and Akiba Rubinstein, defeating all three in the process.

Landau played and lost some matches: in 1930 against Géza Maróczy (+0 –3 =0) at Amsterdam; in 1930 against Akiba Rubinstein (+0 –3 =2) at Amsterdam; in 1931 against Max Euwe (+1 –3 =2) at Amsterdam; in 1932 against Salo Flohr (+0 –1 =3) at Rotterdam; in 1933 against Rudolf Spielmann (+1 –2 =3) at Rotterdam; in 1934 against Andor Lilienthal (+1 –2 =3) at Amsterdam; in 1934 against Euwe (+1 –4 =1) at Amsterdam. In Autumn 1934, he won (+6 –0 =0), and drew (+4 –4 =2) matches against Johannes van den Bosch.

He represented his adopted country on fourth board in 3rd Chess Olympiad at Hamburg 1930 (+5 –7 =3), and on second board in 7th Chess Olympiad at Stockholm 1937 (+5 –2 =8).

In 1933, he tied for 4th–6th at Scheveningen (Flohr won). In February 1934, he took 2nd, behind Alexander Alekhine, at Rotterdam (Qudragular). In October–December 1935, during the World Championship match between Alekhine and Euwe in the Netherlands, Landau served as official second for Alekhine. In May 1936, he tied for 3rd–4th at Ostend. In July 1936, he tied for 7th–9th at Zandvoort. In 1936, he lost two matches against Spielmann, at Amsterdam (+0 –4 =4), and at Zandvoort (+1 –3 =3). In 1936, he tied for 4th–6th at Hanover. In October 1936, he tied for 1st with Alekhine at Amsterdam (Quadrangular). In October 1936, he tied for 4th–6th at Amsterdam.

In 1936, he won the 10th Dutch national championship (although the world champion, Euwe, did not compete).

In April 1937, he tied for 4th–5th at Ostend. In June–July 1937, he tied for 15th–16th at Kemeri, but won the best game prize. In June 1938, he tied for 5th–6th at Noordwijk. In 1938, he tied for 5th–6th at Amsterdam (11th Dutch ch.). In November 1938, he was the referee in famous AVRO Tournament. In 1938/39, he tied for 3 rd-4th with Vasja Pirc, behind Szabo and Euwe, at Hastings. In 1939, he tied for 4 th-6th at Amsterdam (KNSB), shared 1st with Euwe at Amsterdam (VARA) took 3rd at Baarn B, tied for 4th–5th at Barnemouth. In 1939 he also drew a match against Theo van Scheltinga at Amsterdam (+3 –3 =4), drew a match against László Szabó at Amsterdam (+2 –2 =6), won at Amsterdam (the 12th NED-ch), and lost a match for the Dutch Champion title to former World Champion Euwe (+0 –5 =5).

During World War II, in 1940, he won at Baarn (Quadrangular), took 4th at Delft (Quadrangular), tied for 3rd–4th at Amsterdam (VAS), tied for 4th–7th at Rotterdam (Kamstra Cup), and tied for 1st–3rd with Nicolaas Cortlever and Lodewijk Prins at Leeuwarden. In 1941, he won at Groningen.

=== Attempt to escape the Nazis; Concentration camp ===
Finally, in September 1942, Landau tried to escape the Nazis by fleeing to Switzerland with his family, but they were caught on September 28 in Breda, near the border with Belgium and sent to Westerbork transit camp. He was sent to a concentration camp in Gräditz, Silesia in November 1943, where he died sometime between December 1943 and 31 March 1944 (probably March). His wife and young daughter, whose hiding place was betrayed, were sent to Auschwitz in September 1944, where they were gassed on October 12, 1944.

== Notable chess games ==
- Salo Landau vs Akiba Rubinstein, Rotterdam 1931, Queen’s Gambit Declined, Orthodox Defense, D66, 1-0
- Salo Landau vs Efim Bogoljubow, Zandvoort 1936, Queen’s Gambit Declined, Cambridge Springs Variation, D52, 1-0
- Salo Landau vs Eero Böök, Kemeri 1937, Queen's Pawn Game, D05, 1-0 The best game prize !
- Max Euwe vs Salo Landau, Hastings 1938/39, Grünfeld Defense, Russian Variation, D96, 0-1
- Hans Kmoch vs Salo Landau, Groningen 1941, Queen's Gambit Declined, Slav, Exchange Variation, D14, 0-1
