= Opoczka =

- Village
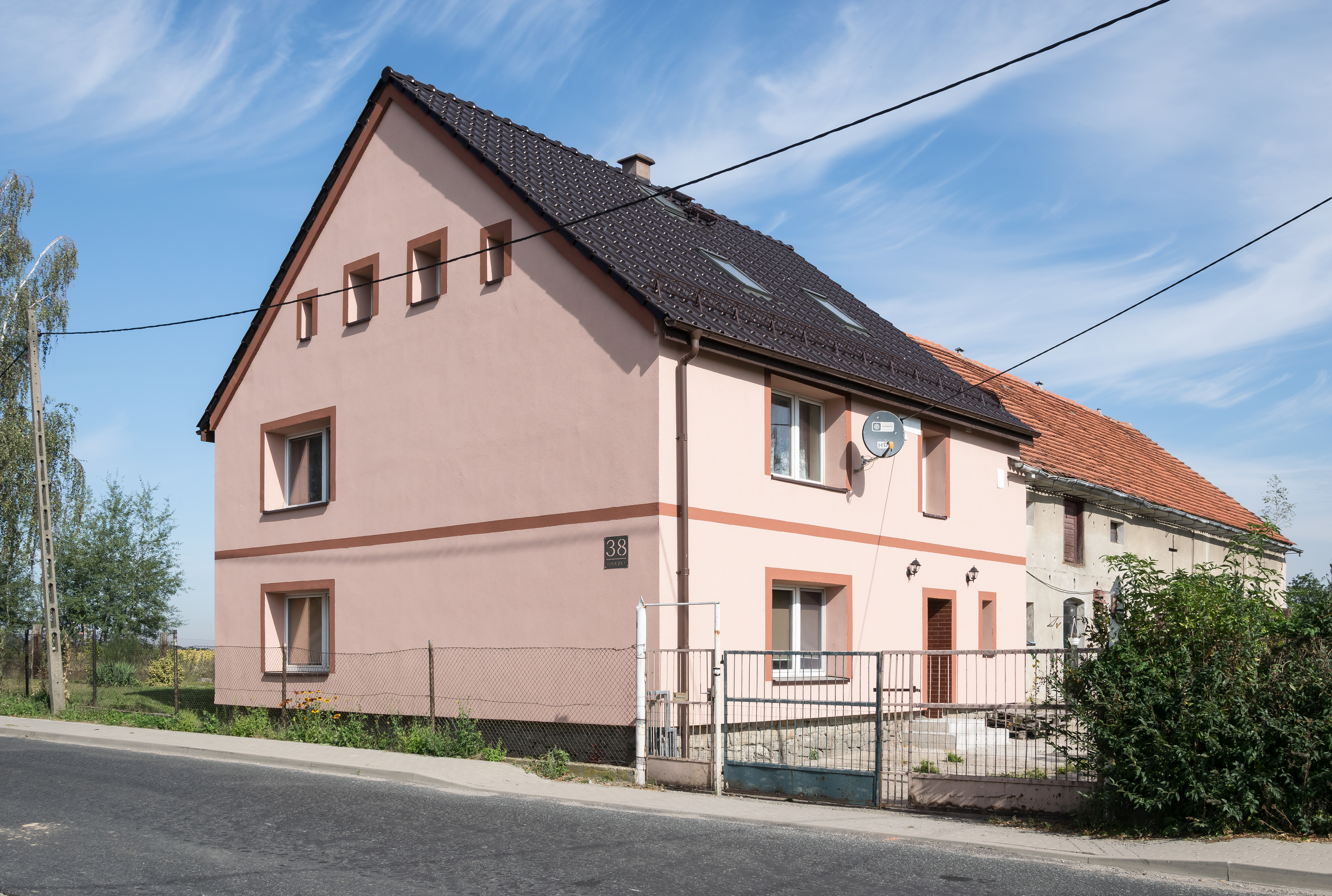

- Location within Poland
- Coordinates: 50°47′57″N 16°30′00″E
- Country: Poland
- Voivodeship: Lower Silesian
- County: Świdnica
- Gmina: Gmina Świdnica
- Time zone: UTC+1 (CET)
  - Summer (DST): UTC+2 (CEST)
- Vehicle registration: DSW

Opoczka [ɔˈpɔt͡ʂka] is a village in the administrative district of Gmina Świdnica, within Świdnica County, Lower Silesian Voivodeship, in south-western Poland.

== History ==
The village of Opoczka was first mentioned in a document from 1372 concerning its sale. The village was erected on a so-called “surowy korzeń” (Eng. Raw Root) that is a forest area cleared for the purpose of founding a village. The surroundings of the village were never part of any knights estates. At first, they were inhabited only by peasants, who lived on 12 farms, 17 hectares each. The village's acreage was of about 300 ha.

There was also a watermill on the area belonging to Opoczka, but it was located away from the other houses, by the brook now called “Węglówka”.

Three large ponds were located at the border with the village Bojanice; they were owned by the landlords of Opoczka. Since the foundation of the village, the inhabitants of Opoczka belonged to the parish in Makowice. During the Reformation most of the inhabitants of Opoczka converted to Lutheranism, and after the Thirty Years' War, until 1945, they tied themselves with the Church of Peace in Świdnica. Opoczka went through different stages of development, with the greatest flourishing during the mid-19th century. In 1845 there were 53 houses, a manor and an autonomous village magistrate's office in the village. At the same time first craftsmen arrived in the village and 8 weaving looms were set up. Later on also a blacksmith, an electric workshop and a stonemason's workshop were established, together with an Evangelical school.

After World War II Opoczka was repopulated by Polish repatriates mainly from the former eastern Polish lands annexed by the Soviet Union. The village had a typical agricultural character, the professional life was connected to farm work and stockbreeding. The cultural, entertainment and educational activities were all affiliated with the village community house. Village meetings, celebrations and events were carried out there. Also training programmes, courses were conducted about household management, cuisine, tailoring and so on.

Between 1983 and the early 1990s the “Harcerski Teatr Bajki” (Eng. Scout Fairytales Theatre) with their own musical band, a puppet show, a mandolin band, an art club, a photo lab, two rock bands: “SLAMSI” and “Układ N”, and a film club operated at the community house. The community house could be visited both by young and adult residents of Opoczka and the surrounding villages.

In the community centre there also was a branch of the municipal library, and in the years 1987-90 the building served as the seat of the Municipal Centre for Culture.

From 1945 until today 30 new buildings and a large construction company have been erected in Opoczka. Now the village has 69 address points and 255 inhabitants.
