= Witoszów Górny =

- Village
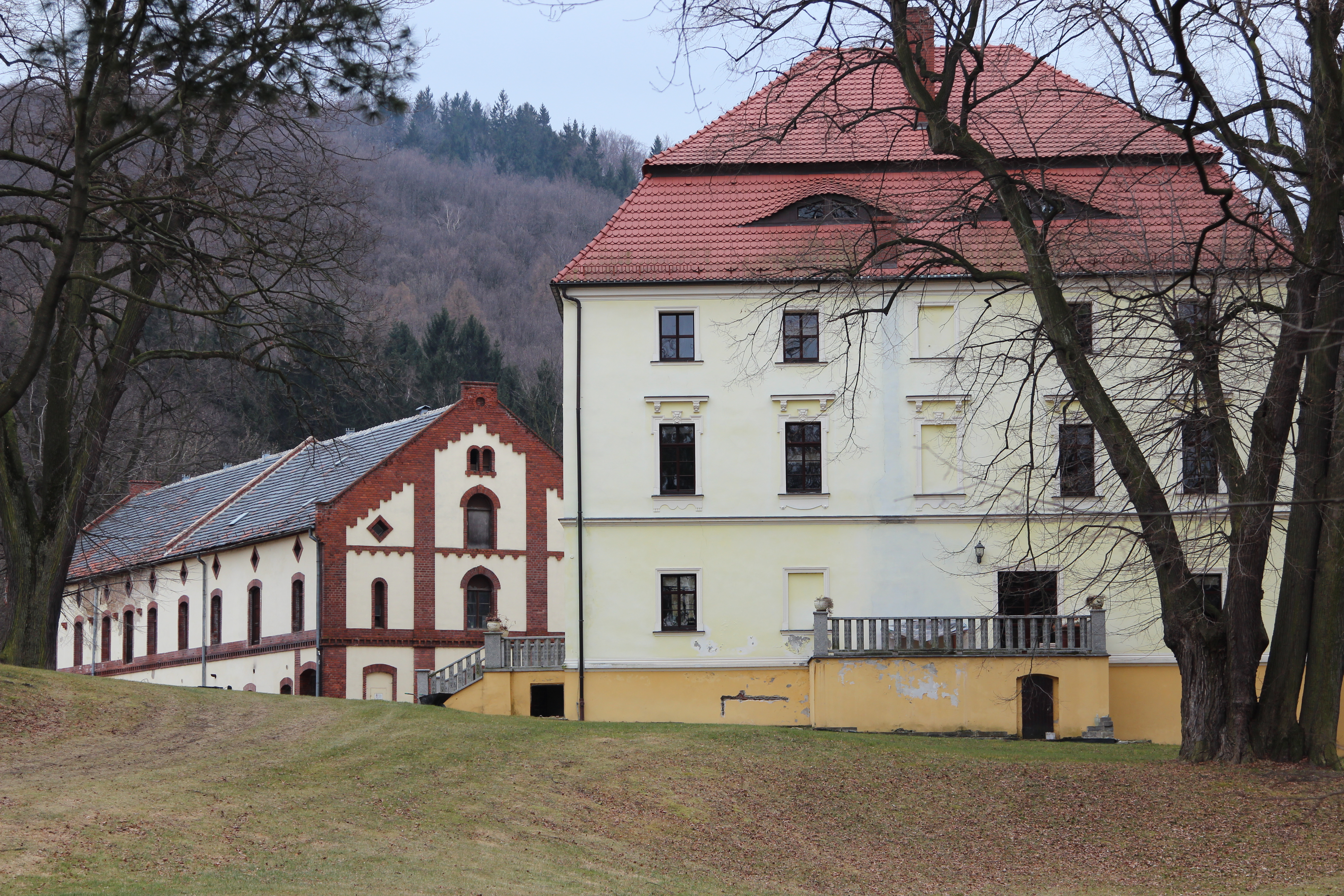
- Manor

- Location within Poland
- Coordinates: 50°49′N 16°24′E
- Country: Poland
- Voivodeship: Lower Silesian
- County: Świdnica
- Gmina: Gmina Świdnica

Witoszów Górny [viˈtɔʂuf ˈɡurnɨ] is a village in the administrative district of Gmina Świdnica, within Świdnica County, Lower Silesian Voivodeship, in south-western Poland.
