= Sulisławice, Świdnica County =

Village in the administrative district of Gmina Świdnica

Sulisławice
- Village
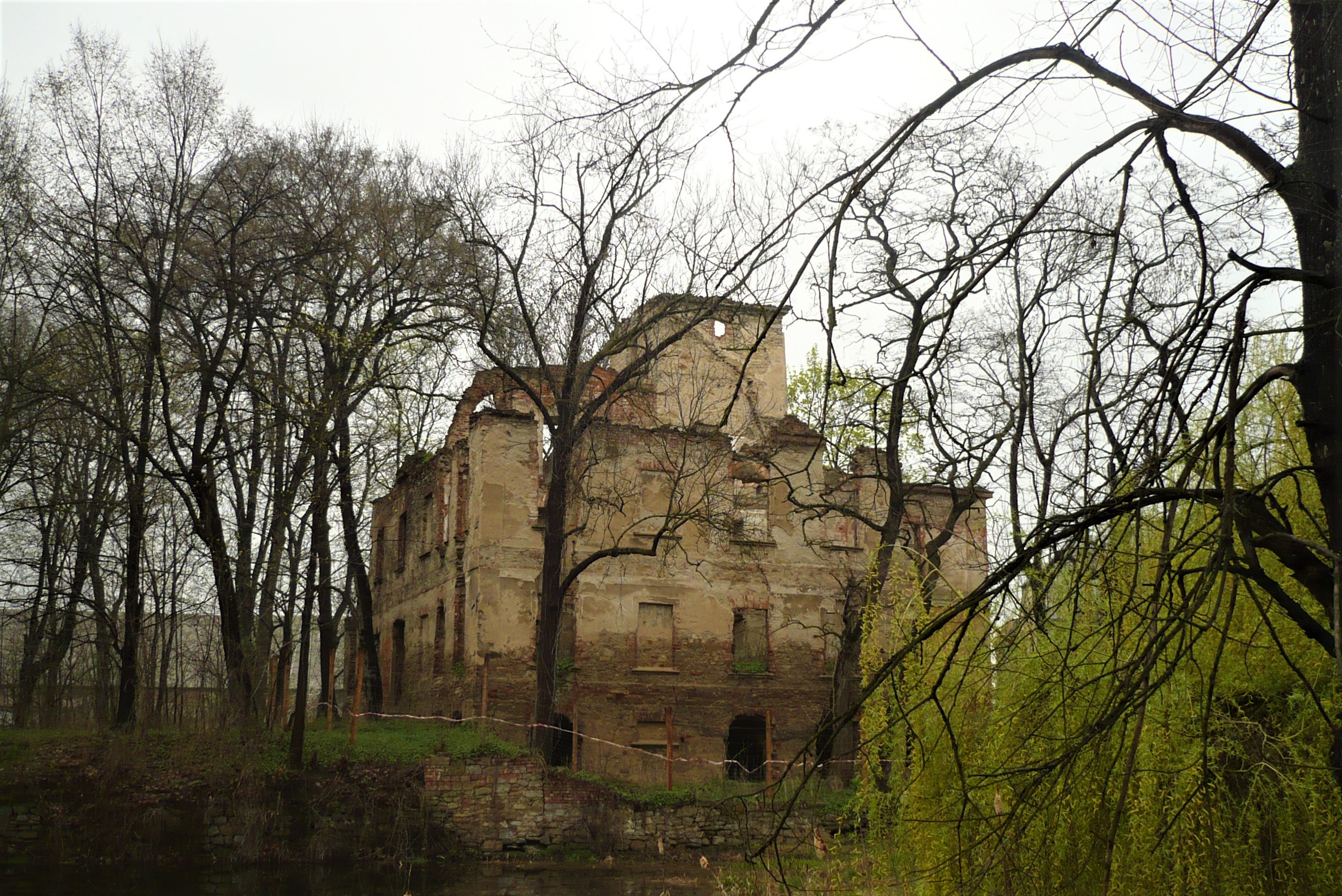
- Ruins of the palace in Sulisławice

- Location within Poland
- Coordinates: 50°52′39″N 16°29′32″E
- Country: Poland
- Voivodeship: Lower Silesian
- County: Świdnica
- Gmina: Gmina Świdnica

Sulisławice [suliswaˈvit͡sɛ] (German: Zülzendorf) is a village in the administrative district of Gmina Świdnica, within Świdnica County, Lower Silesian Voivodeship, in south-western Poland.
