= Komorów, Świdnica County =

Komorów
- Village
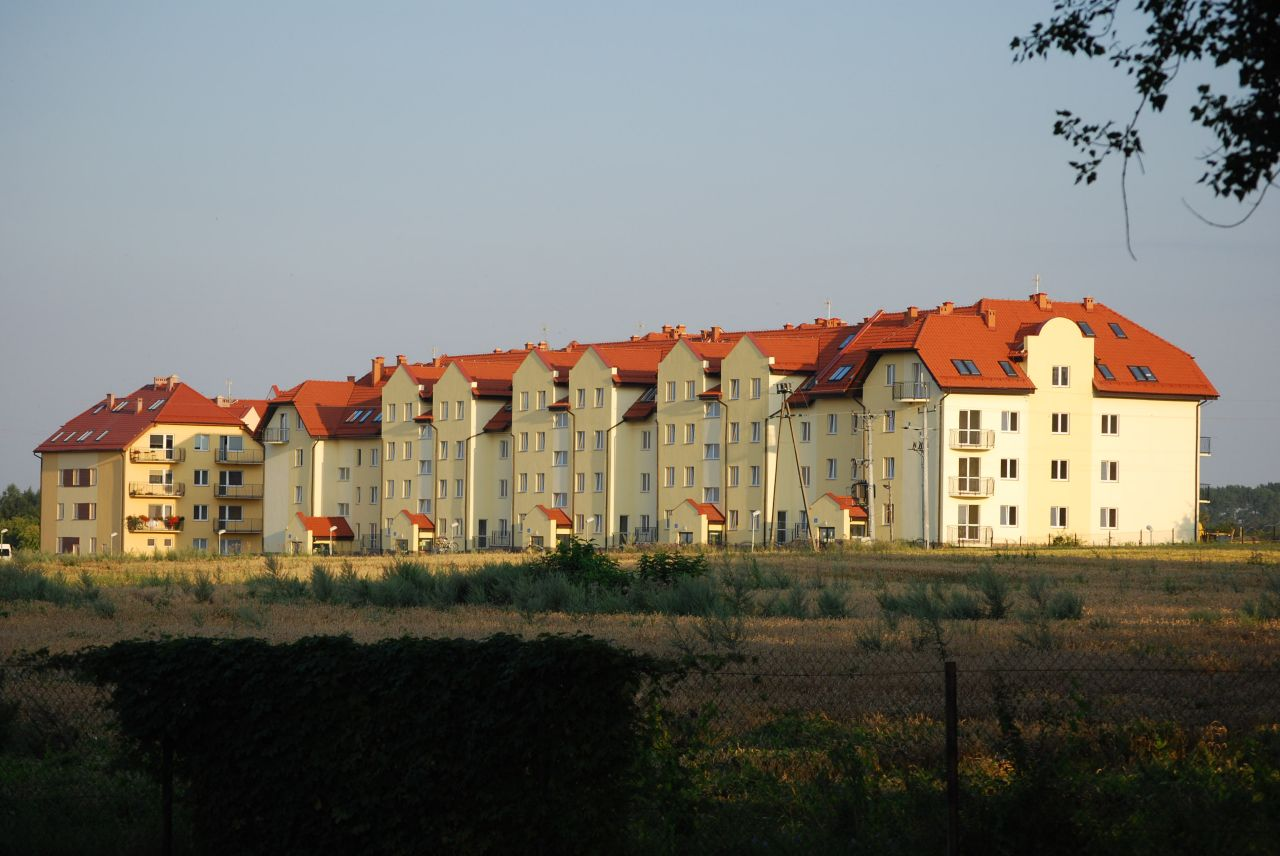

- Location within Poland
- Coordinates: 50°50′40″N 16°24′54″E
- Country: Poland
- Voivodeship: Lower Silesian
- County: Świdnica
- Gmina: Gmina Świdnica

Komorów [kɔˈmɔruf] is a village in the administrative district of Gmina Świdnica, within Świdnica County, Lower Silesian Voivodeship, in south-western Poland.
