= Stachowiczki =

- Village
- Location within Poland
- Coordinates: 50°45′N 16°30′E
- Country: Poland
- Voivodeship: Lower Silesian
- County: Świdnica
- Gmina: Gmina Świdnica

Stachowiczki [staxɔˈvit͡ʂki] is a village in the administrative district of Gmina Świdnica, within Świdnica County, Lower Silesian Voivodeship, in south-western Poland.
