= Bystrzyca Dolna =

- Village
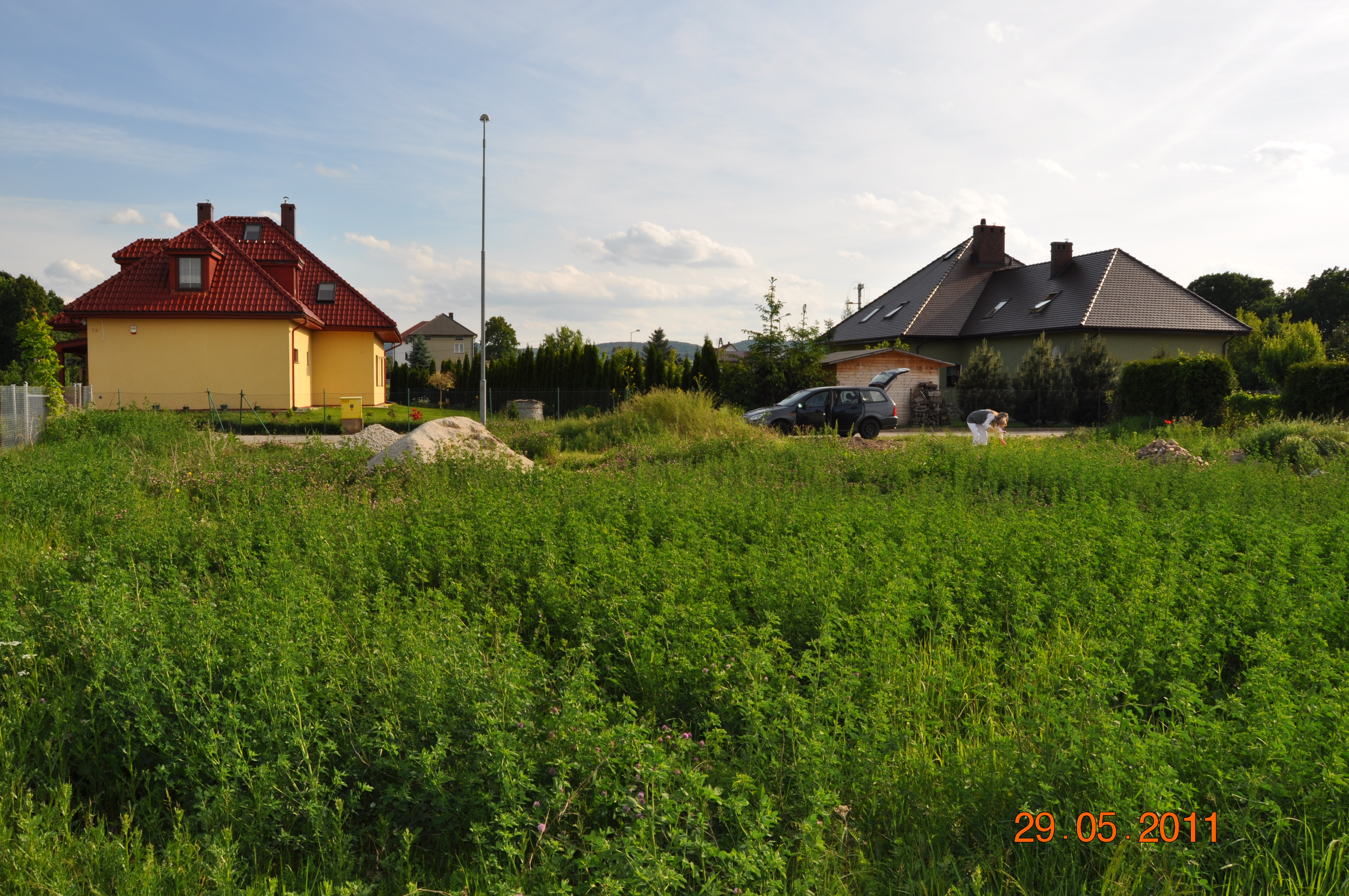
- Bystrzyca Dolna, Poland - panoramio

- Location within Poland
- Coordinates: 50°48′32″N 16°28′28″E
- Country: Poland
- Voivodeship: Lower Silesian
- County: Świdnica
- Gmina: Gmina Świdnica

Bystrzyca Dolna [bɨsˈtʂɨt͡sa ˈdɔlna] is a village in the administrative district of Gmina Świdnica, within Świdnica County, Lower Silesian Voivodeship, in south-western Poland.

== History ==
The village has had 13 names over the years:

"Bistritcza - 1149/50 r., Wistricz - 1330 r., Wystricza - 1300 r., Polnisch Weistritz - 1318 r., Wistricz - 1334 r., Wistricia polonicalis - 1340 r., Polnisschen Weissericz - 1362 r., Polnisch Weistritz - 1372 r., Polnischweistric - 1666 r., Pohl (nisch) Weiseritz - 1743 r., Weistriz Polnisch - 1785 r., Nieder Weistritz - 1886 r., Bystrzyca Dolna - 1945."
