= Emil Krebs =

German hyperpolyglot and sinologist

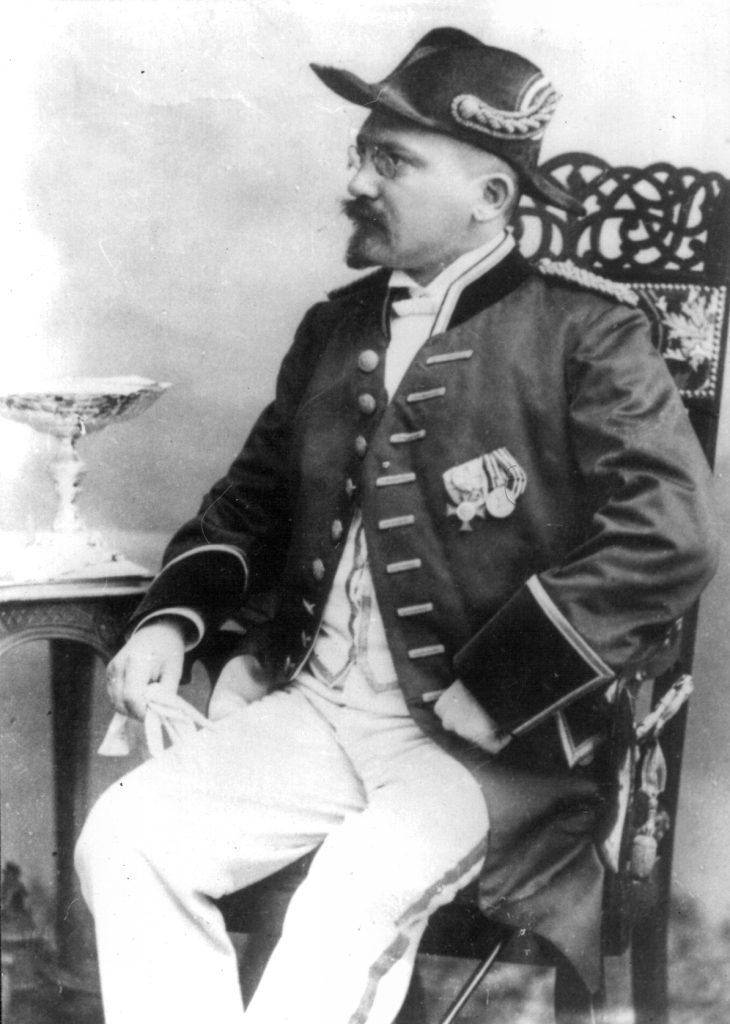
- Born: 15 November 1867; Freiburg, Silesia, Kingdom of Prussia, North German Confederation
- Died: 31 March 1930 (aged 62); Berlin, Free State of Prussia, German Republic
- Education: University of Berlin
- Occupation: Sinologist

Emil Krebs (15 November 1867 – 31 March 1930) was a German polyglot and sinologist. He was reportedly able to speak and write 68 languages and studied 120 other languages.

== Life ==
=== Early life ===
Born in Freiburg in Silesia, Kingdom of Prussia (now Świebodzice, Poland) on 15 November 1867, Emil Krebs was the son of a master carpenter named Gottlob Krebs and his wife Pauline Scholz. In 1870 he moved with his parents to Esdorf, where he attended primary school. From 1878 to 1880 he attended the Freiburger Realschule (secondary school), and from 1880 to 1887 he studied at the gymnasium in Schweidnitz. The curriculum included Latin, French, Hebrew and Classical Greek, but in addition he studied Modern Greek, English, Italian and later Spanish, Russian, Polish, Arabic and Turkish. He left the Schweidnitz gymnasium on 17 March 1887, after passing the Abitur. Thereafter he enrolled in the theology course of the University of Breslau for the summer semester. At that point he already spoke twelve languages.

The following semester Krebs enrolled as a law student at the University of Berlin. The newly founded Oriental seminar department captivated Krebs, who had concluded he wished to make the study of foreign languages the primary objective of his education. He turned first to the study of Mandarin Chinese, because it was regarded by many to be the most difficult language to learn. He began Chinese courses in 1887, and on 24 July 1890 he passed the interpreter's examination in Chinese at the seminar for eastern languages of Berlin University with "good" marks. Within two years, Emil Krebs had absorbed Chinese to such an extent that he had attained the level of a well-educated native.

Despite his passion for learning foreign languages, he did not neglect his legal studies and passed the first State examination (equivalent to today's Staatsexamen) after the prescribed 6 semesters on 12 June 1891, again with "good" marks. He then entered the legal training service with the Royal Prussian district court in Gottesberg as a junior court lawyer. By Easter 1892, he was a junior lawyer at the Berlin Court of Appeal. Soon afterwards he began studying Turkish at the Seminar for Oriental Languages at Berlin University. On 30 September 1893, Krebs was sent to Peking (Beijing) as an aspirant interpreter.

=== Stay in China ===
On 5 December 1893, Krebs arrived in Beijing where he worked and lived until the cessation of diplomatic relations between Germany and China due to World War I. He worked as a diplomatic translator for German interests in Beijing and Qingdao. He took two further Chinese exams in 1894 and 1895, receiving good marks. His work gained him fame due to his impressive fluency. In November 1897, the German Reich took the murder of two missionaries in Shandong Province as a pretext to occupy Qingdao. From 10 November 1897 to February 1898, Krebs joined the occupation of Kiautschou (Jiaozhou). He was accompanied by German troops to impose order and afterwards worked in the imperial government for the area. In 1901, he was appointed Chief Interpreter, and he became a close confidant of Empress Dowager Cixi. After she had inquired as to who in the German delegation was writing such elegant documents in Chinese, and after learning it was Krebs, she invited him often for discussions over tea. While in China, Krebs also learned Mongolian, Manchu, and Tibetan. As a result, he also educated Chinese officials about other languages in their country, and purportedly once translated a letter sent by Mongolian rebels for the Chinese authorities.

While in China, Krebs devoted his time to the study of different languages, and had a greater interest in this than in doing his job, often sleeping during the day due to staying up at night studying languages. He would study different languages in strict rotation, assigning one for each day of the week. He maintained a library, organized by language and language group, and wrote a summary which he regularly reviewed for every book. He only sought out social interaction when he could use one of his languages. Krebs could learn a language very fast. A German attaché in China, Werner Otto von Hentig, related how one day, he had heard two strangers speaking a language he did not recognize. After inquiring and learning that it was Armenian, he learned it in nine weeks.

On 15 February 1912, Krebs was given the title of Legationsrat. On 5 February 1913, he married Mande Heyne in the German imperial consulate in Shanghai. She was the eldest daughter of the Senior Privy Councillor Glasewald. In February and March 1914, he was attached to the envoy of Haxthausen during its official travel to central and south China. Finally, on 8 August 1914, civil powers were transferred to the legation. Since he was in informed circles of Beijing as an always welcome guest, it was decided that the Chinese empress should receive updates more frequently than interlocutors.

In 1917, after the cessation of diplomatic relations between Germany and China due to World War I, Krebs returned to Germany by way of the United States.

=== Return to Berlin ===
On 23 May 1917, he returned to Berlin and on 8 September was transferred due to the dissolution of the legation in Peking, which became effective on 1 January 1918. He was then appointed to temporary service with the intelligence office for the Orient (November/December 1917), where he was assigned to the coding service of the Foreign Office until after the First World War. Between 1921 and 1923 he also worked in the translating and interpreting service. During this time, he also plunged himself into language study.

In March 1930, Krebs died at his home in the Charlottenburg district of Berlin, Lindenstrasse 26. He had collapsed while carrying out a translation. He was buried in the Stahnsdorf South-Western Cemetery (Epiphanien Gartenblock I, garden place 81). His brain was recovered and preserved by the researcher Oskar Vogt and is still kept as an "elite brain" in the C. & O. Vogt Institute for Brain Research at the Heinrich Heine University in Düsseldorf.

== Legacy ==
Krebs's private library of over 3,500 volumes and writings in approximately 120 languages is stored in the Library of Congress in Washington, D.C. From the compilation and the range of literature written in the respective national languages and a language list personally written by him, it can be inferred that Krebs had mastered all the languages of today's European Union, as well as other languages such as "Egyptian" (possibly Coptic), Ainu, Albanian, Arabic, Armenian, Burmese, Chinese, Georgian, Hebrew, Japanese, Javanese, Korean, Latin, Manchu, Mongolian, Nivkh, Persian, Russian, Sanskrit, "Syrian" (possibly Aramaic), Tibetan, Turkish, and Urdu.

His writings and books of language studies prove that he learned foreign languages not only through his native German, but also through previously mastered foreign languages. For example, through English he learned "Afghan" (Pashto or Dari), Burmese, Gujarati, Hindi, Irish, Sinhalese, and Portuguese, through Russian he learned Buryat, Finnish, Tatar, and Ukrainian, and through Spanish he learned the Basque dialects of Gipuzkoan, Biscayan, Lapurdian, and Zuberoan. Besides German, Krebs predominantly spoke English, French, Russian, Chinese, Greek, Italian, Turkish, Latin, Spanish, and Arabic for learning and improving his knowledge of a new language. He passed official government language tests in Chinese, Turkish, Japanese, and Finnish. Sixty-one different translations of the New Testament provided additional aid in his studies.

== Works ==
Krebs produced an extended translation of the Chinese Shade Plays by Wilhelm Grube (Munich: 1915).

== See also ==
- Sinology
- Giuseppe Mezzofanti
- Lorenzo Hervas y Panduro
- Johan Vandewalle
- List of polyglots
