= Jakubów, Świdnica County =

Jakubów
- Village
- Location within Poland
- Coordinates: 50°49′06″N 16°30′13″E
- Country: Poland
- Voivodeship: Lower Silesian
- County: Świdnica
- Gmina: Gmina Świdnica

Jakubów [jaˈkubuf] is a village in the administrative district of Gmina Świdnica, within Świdnica County, Lower Silesian Voivodeship, in south-western Poland.
