= Wieruszów (disambiguation) =

Wieruszów may refer to the following places in Poland:

- Wieruszów, a town in Łódź Voivodeship (central Poland)
- Wieruszów, Lower Silesian Voivodeship, a village in Świdnica County, Lower Silesian Voivodeship (SW Poland)
