= Watzenrode =

Watzenrode may refer to:

- Lucas Watzenrode the Younger (1447–1512), prince-bishop of Ermland, Warmia, uncle of Nicolaus Copernicus
- Lucas Watzenrode the Elder (1400–1462), Hanseatic League tradesman in Thorn (Toruń), Prussia, grandfather of Nicolaus Copernicus

== See also ==
- Pszenno (German: Weizenrodau), a village in Poland
