= Wiśniowa, Lower Silesian Voivodeship =

Wiśniowa
- Village
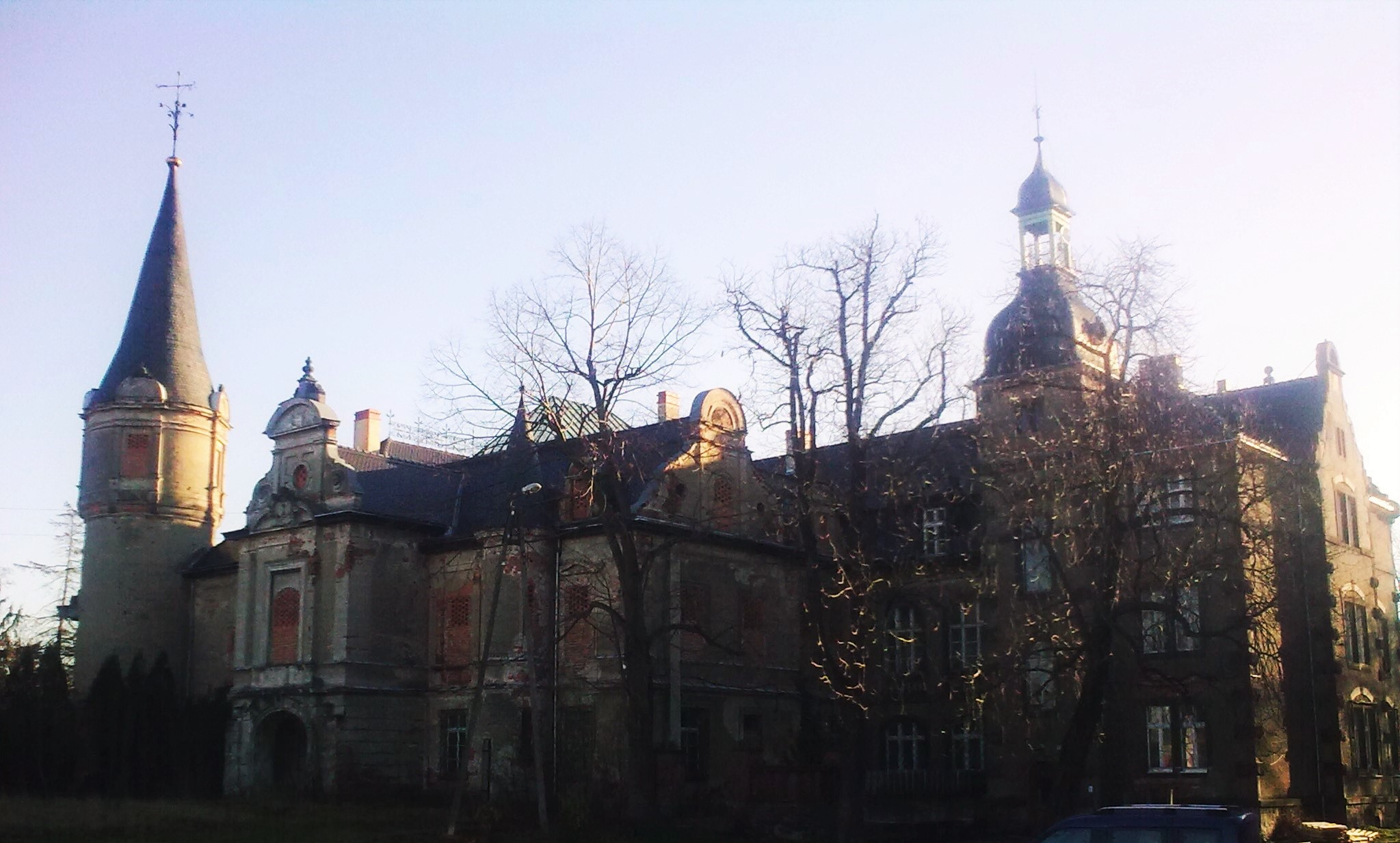
- Palace in Wiśniowa

- Location within Poland
- Coordinates: 50°53′01″N 16°30′02″E
- Country: Poland
- Voivodeship: Lower Silesian
- County: Świdnica
- Gmina: Gmina Świdnica

Wiśniowa [viɕˈɲɔva] is a village in the administrative district of Gmina Świdnica, within Świdnica County, Lower Silesian Voivodeship, in south-western Poland.
