= Pankow (disambiguation) =

Pankow is the most populous and the second-largest borough by area of Berlin.

Pankow may also refer to:

== Places ==
- Pankow (locality), a locality of Berlin in the Pankow borough
- Panków, a village in south-west Poland
- Pańków, a village in eastern Poland
- Penkow, a municipality in Germany

== Other uses ==
- Pankow (surname)
- Pankow (German band), a German band named after the district

== See also ==
- Berlin-Pankow station, a railway station in Berlin
