= Bystrzyca Górna =

- Village
- Location within Poland
- Coordinates: 50°47′N 16°27′E
- Country: Poland
- Voivodeship: Lower Silesian
- County: Świdnica
- Gmina: Gmina Świdnica

Bystrzyca Górna [bɨsˈtʂɨt͡sa ˈɡurna] is a village in the administrative district of Gmina Świdnica, within Świdnica County, Lower Silesian Voivodeship, in south-western Poland.

== Notable people ==
- Günter Prinz (1929-2020), German journalist
