= Złoty Las =

- Village
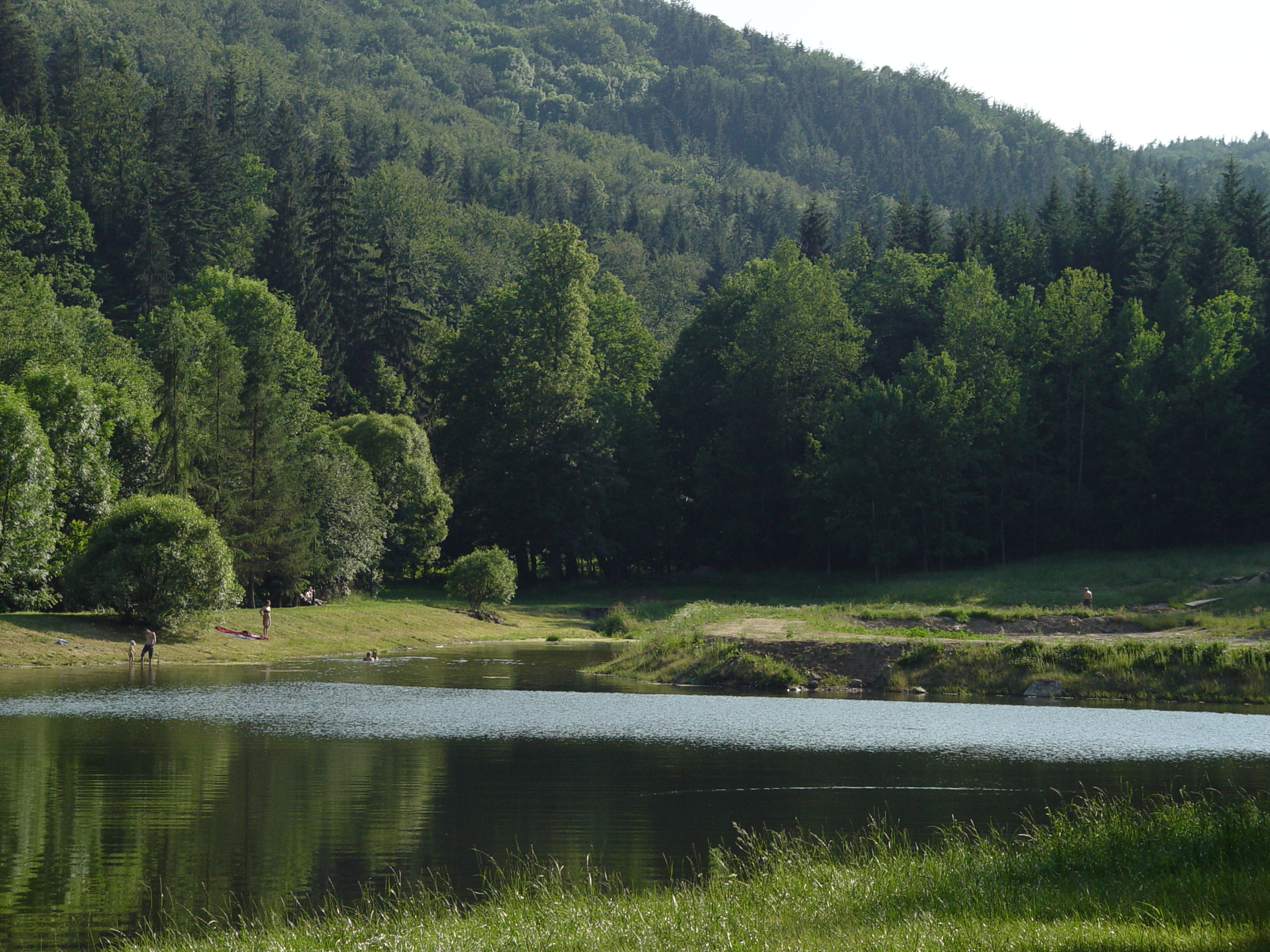
- Small artificial lake in Złoty Las

- Location within Poland
- Coordinates: 50°46′50″N 16°24′56″E
- Country: Poland
- Voivodeship: Lower Silesian
- County: Świdnica
- Gmina: Gmina Świdnica

Population
  - Total: 32

Złoty Las [ˈzwɔtɨ ˈlas] is a village in the administrative district of Gmina Świdnica, within Świdnica County, Lower Silesian Voivodeship, in south-western Poland.
