= Zawiszów, Świdnica County =

Zawiszów
- Village
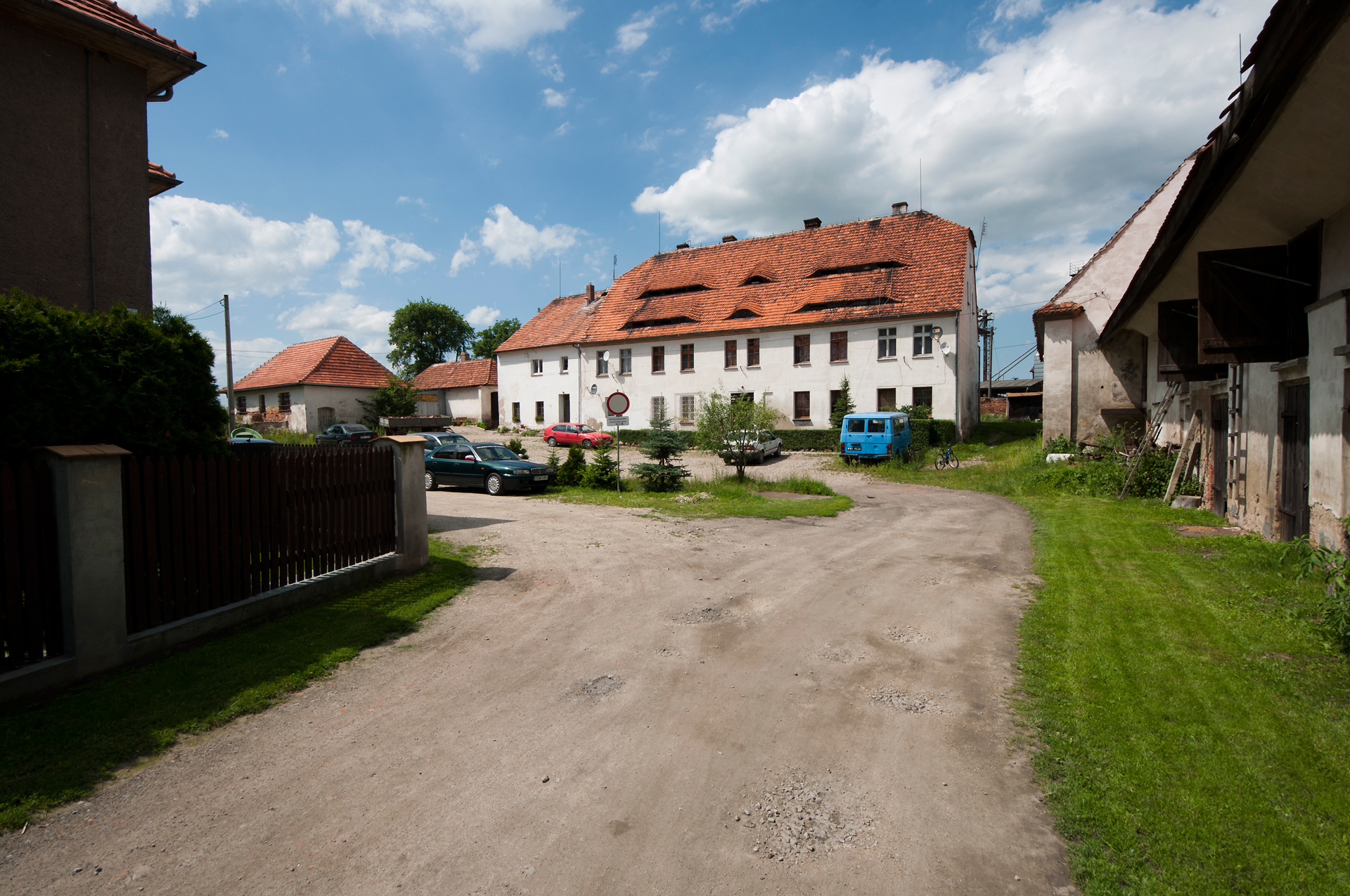
- Manor

- Location within Poland
- Coordinates: 50°52′14″N 16°29′11″E
- Country: Poland
- Voivodeship: Lower Silesian
- County: Świdnica
- Gmina: Gmina Świdnica

Zawiszów [zaˈviʂuf] is a village in the administrative district of Gmina Świdnica, within Świdnica County, Lower Silesian Voivodeship, in south-western Poland.
