= Stachowice =

- Village
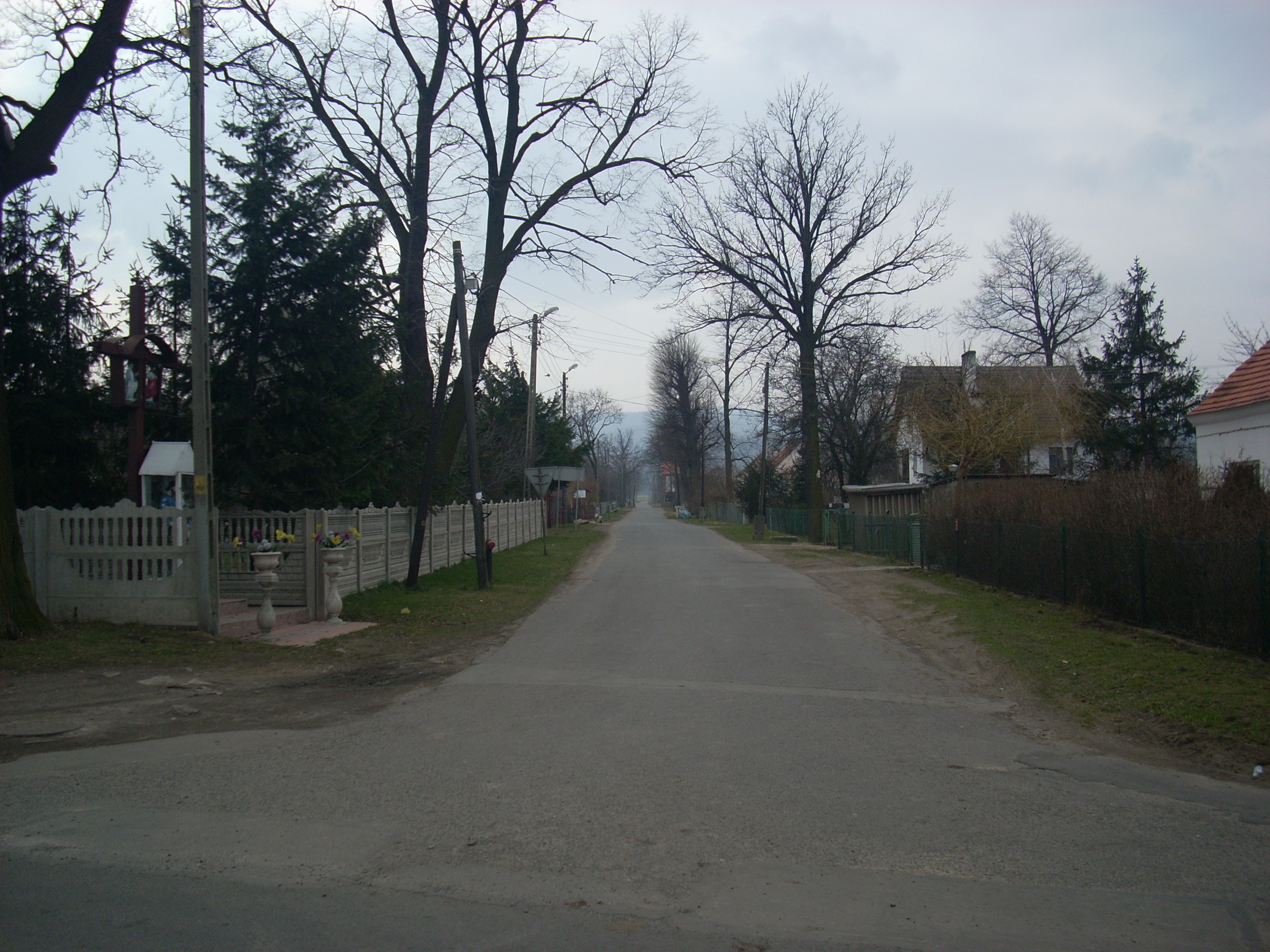

- Location within Poland
- Coordinates: 50°44′36″N 16°33′00″E
- Country: Poland
- Voivodeship: Lower Silesian
- County: Świdnica
- Gmina: Gmina Świdnica

Stachowice [staxɔˈvit͡sɛ] is a village in the administrative district of Gmina Świdnica, within Świdnica County, Lower Silesian Voivodeship, in south-western Poland.
