= Krzczonów, Lower Silesian Voivodeship =

Krzczonów
- Village
- Location within Poland
- Coordinates: 50°49′08″N 16°33′50″E
- Country: Poland
- Voivodeship: Lower Silesian
- County: Świdnica
- Gmina: Gmina Świdnica

Krzczonów [ˈkʂt͡ʂɔnuf] is a village in the administrative district of Gmina Świdnica, within Świdnica County, Lower Silesian Voivodeship, in south-western Poland.
