= Lubachów =

- Village
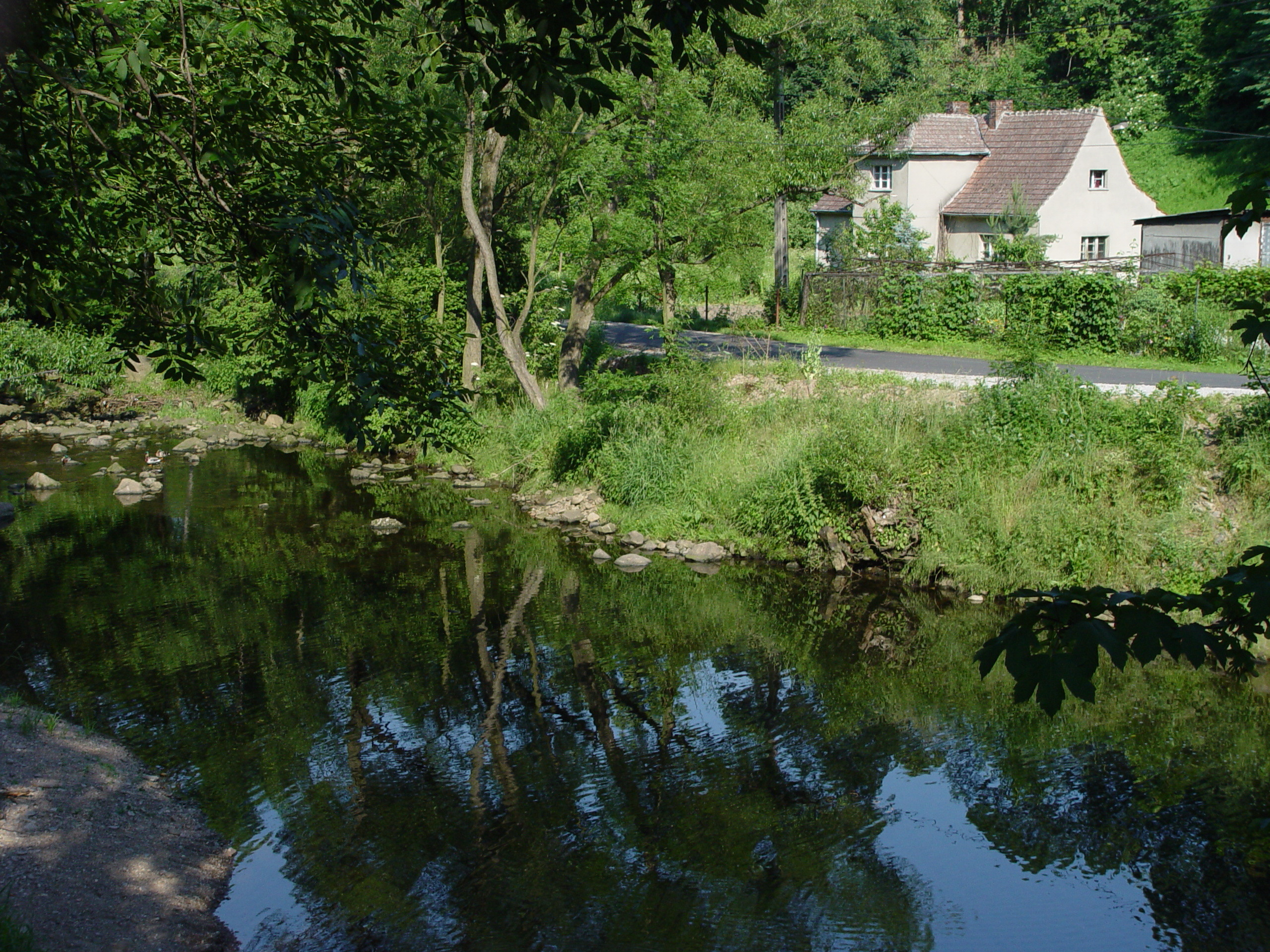
- Bystrzyca River in Lubachów

- Location within Poland
- Coordinates: 50°46′13″N 16°25′57″E
- Country: Poland
- Voivodeship: Lower Silesian
- County: Świdnica
- Gmina: Gmina Świdnica

Lubachów [luˈbaxuf] (German: Breitenhain) is a village in the administrative district of Gmina Świdnica, within Świdnica County, Lower Silesian Voivodeship, in south-western Poland.
