= Wilków, Świdnica County =

Witków
- Village
- Location within Poland
- Coordinates: 50°52′10″N 16°32′13″E
- Country: Poland
- Voivodeship: Lower Silesian
- County: Świdnica
- Gmina: Gmina Świdnica

Witków [ˈvitkuf] is a village in the administrative district of Gmina Świdnica, within Świdnica County, Lower Silesian Voivodeship, in south-western Poland.
