= Jagodnik =

Jagodnik may refer to the following places in Poland:

- Jagodnik, Lower Silesian Voivodeship (south-west Poland)
- Jagodnik, Subcarpathian Voivodeship (south-east Poland)
- Jagodnik, Warmian-Masurian Voivodeship (north Poland)
