= Miłochów =

- Village
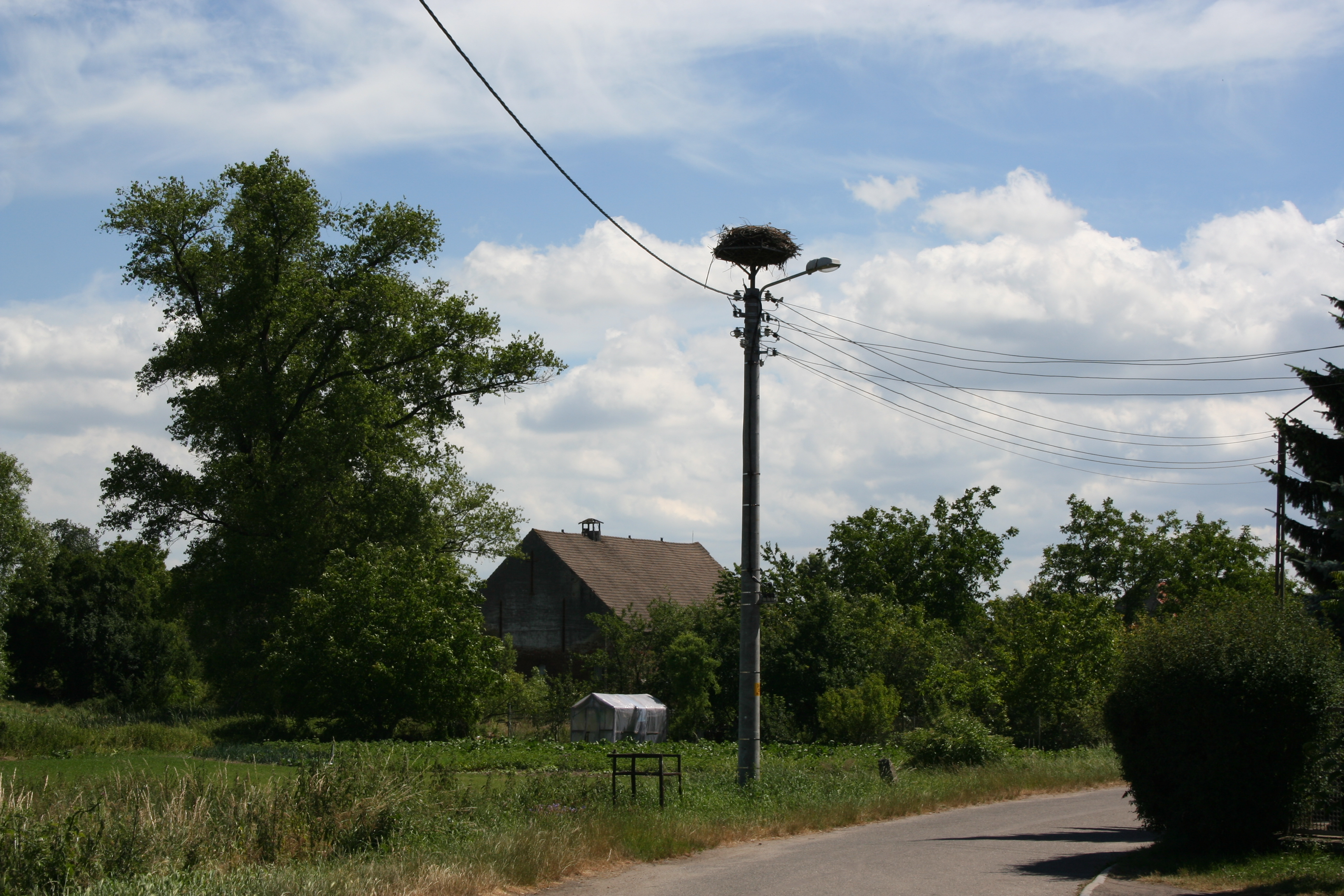

- Location within Poland
- Coordinates: 50°50′16″N 16°32′50″E
- Country: Poland
- Voivodeship: Lower Silesian
- County: Świdnica
- Gmina: Gmina Świdnica
- Time zone: UTC+1 (CET)
  - Summer (DST): UTC+2 (CEST)
- Vehicle registration: DSW

Miłochów [miˈwɔxuf] is a village in the administrative district of Gmina Świdnica, within Świdnica County, Lower Silesian Voivodeship, in south-western Poland.

== History ==
Following the Second World War repatriated Polish settlers proposed renaming the village Stefanówka after the first of their children to be born there.
