= Mokrzeszów =

- Village
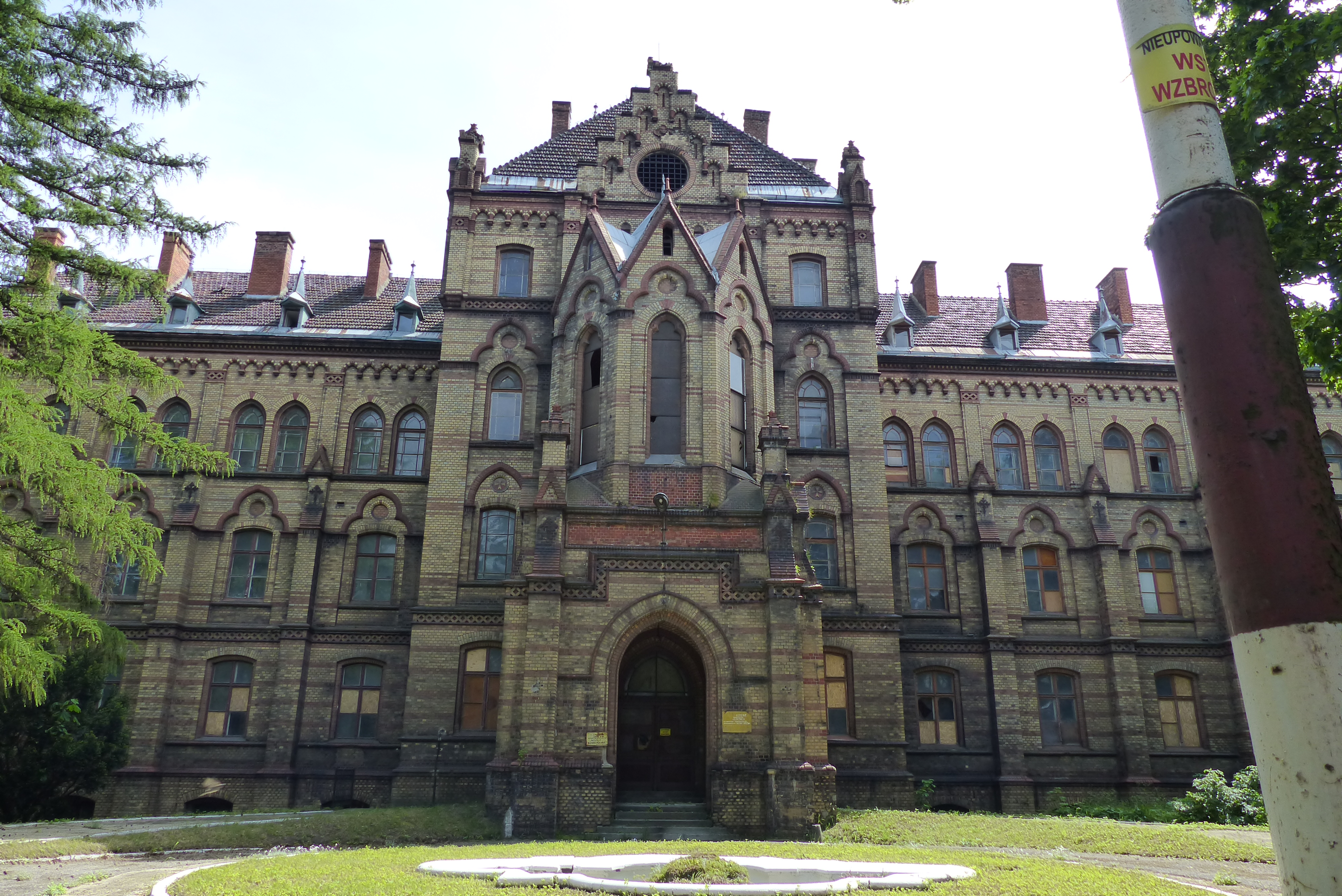
- Neo-Gothic Hospital of the Maltese Order in Mokrzeszów

- Location within Poland
- Coordinates: 50°51′02″N 16°22′13″E
- Country: Poland
- Voivodeship: Lower Silesian
- County: Świdnica
- Gmina: Gmina Świdnica

Population
  - Total: 1,100

Mokrzeszów [mɔˈkʂɛʂuf] (German: Kunzendorf) is a village in the administrative district of Gmina Świdnica, within Świdnica County, Lower Silesian Voivodeship, in south-western Poland.
