= Lutomia Mała =

- Village
- Location within Poland
- Coordinates: 50°46′18″N 16°31′48″E
- Country: Poland
- Voivodeship: Lower Silesian
- County: Świdnica
- Gmina: Gmina Świdnica

Lutomia Mała [luˈtɔmja ˈmawa] is a village in the administrative district of Gmina Świdnica, within Świdnica County, Lower Silesian Voivodeship, in south-western Poland.
