= Modliszów =

- Village
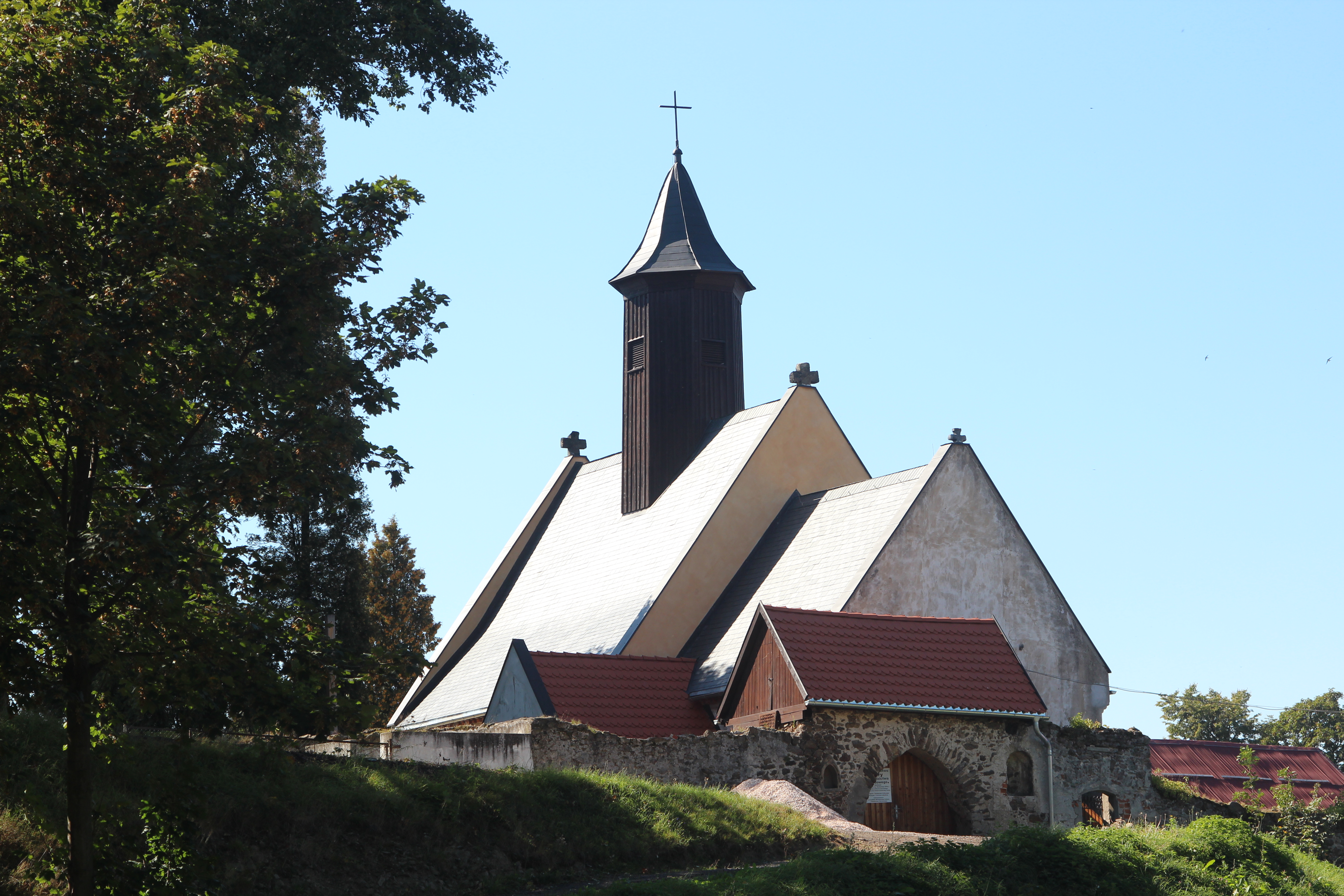
- Church of Saint Bartholomew

- Location within Poland
- Coordinates: 50°47′35″N 16°23′32″E
- Country: Poland
- Voivodeship: Lower Silesian
- County: Świdnica
- Gmina: Gmina Świdnica

Population
  - Total: 1,023

Modliszów [mɔdˈliʂuf] (German: Hohgiersdorf) is a village in the administrative district of Gmina Świdnica, within Świdnica County, Lower Silesian Voivodeship, in south-western Poland.
