= Lutomia Dolna =

- Village
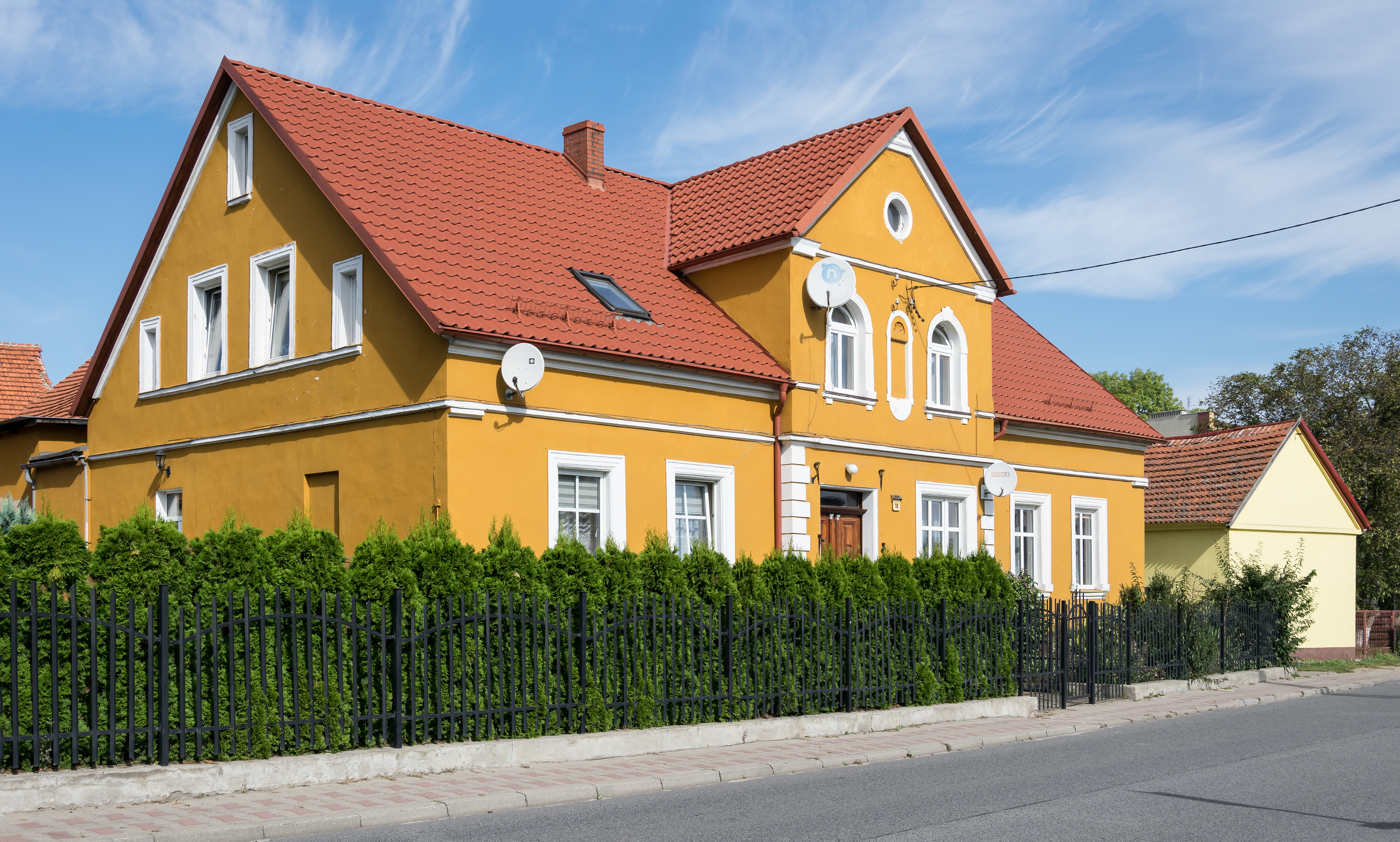
- A house in Lutomia Dolna

- Location within Poland
- Coordinates: 50°45′36″N 16°32′35″E
- Country: Poland
- Voivodeship: Lower Silesian
- County: Świdnica
- Gmina: Gmina Świdnica

Lutomia Dolna [luˈtɔmja ˈdɔlna] is a village in the administrative district of Gmina Świdnica, within Świdnica County, Lower Silesian Voivodeship, in south-western Poland.
