= Witoszów Dolny =

- Village
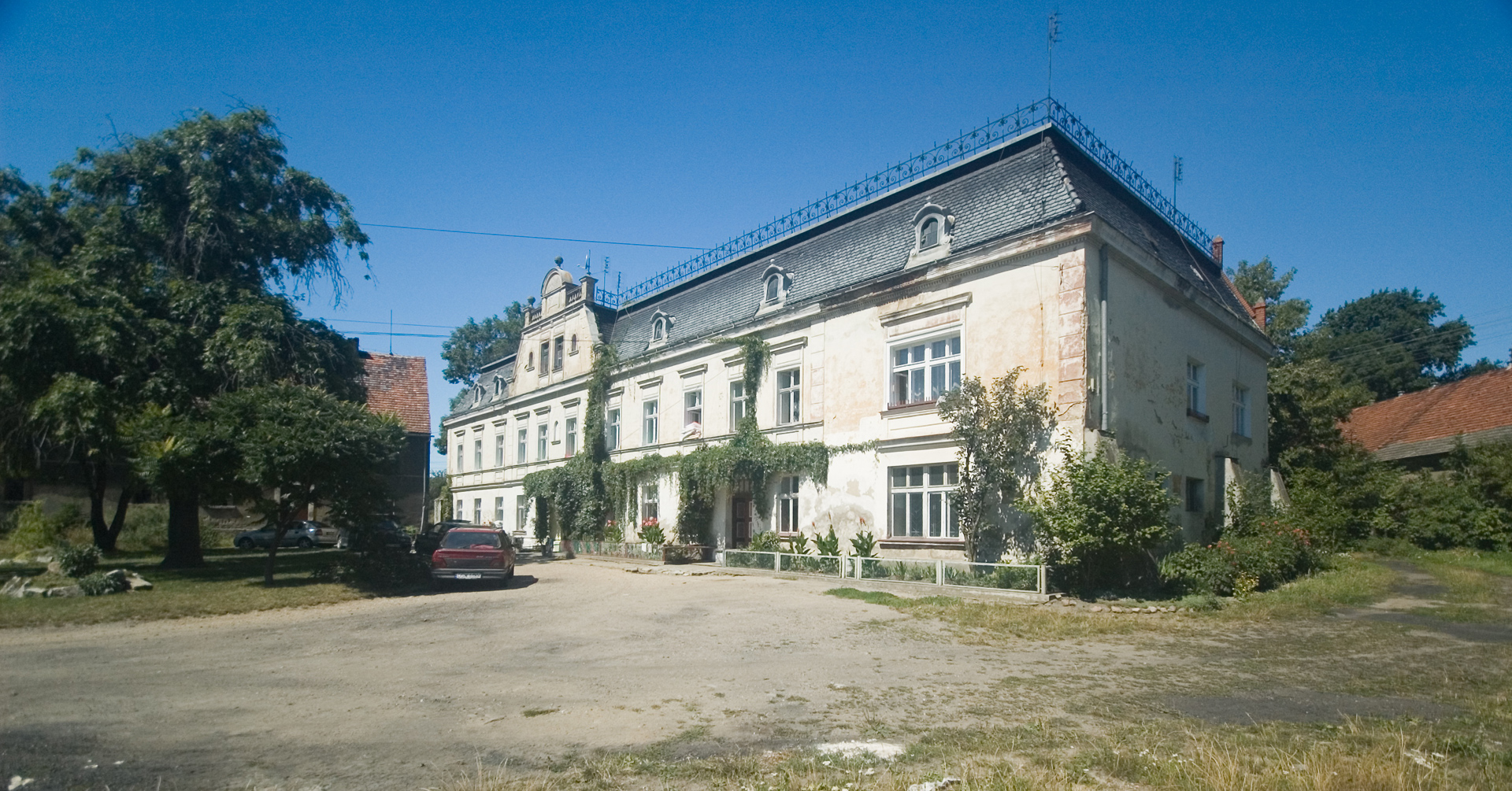
- Palace

- Location within Poland
- Coordinates: 50°49′24″N 16°26′34″E
- Country: Poland
- Voivodeship: Lower Silesian
- County: Świdnica
- Gmina: Gmina Świdnica

Witoszów Dolny [viˈtɔʂuf ˈdɔlnɨ] is a village in the administrative district of Gmina Świdnica, within Świdnica County, Lower Silesian Voivodeship, in south-western Poland.
