= Burkatów =

- Village
- Location within Poland
- Coordinates: 50°47′35″N 16°27′58″E
- Country: Poland
- Voivodeship: Lower Silesian
- County: Świdnica
- Gmina: Gmina Świdnica
- Time zone: UTC+1 (CET)
  - Summer (DST): UTC+2 (CEST)
- Vehicle registration: DSW

Burkatów [burˈkatuf] is a village in the administrative district of Gmina Świdnica, within Świdnica County, Lower Silesian Voivodeship, in south-western Poland.

== History ==
The territory became part of the emerging Polish state in the 10th century, and following its fragmentation into smaller provincial duchies it formed part of the duchies of Duchy of Silesia and Świdnica. In 1280 it was a ducal village of the Piast dynasty. Later, it passed to Bohemia, Hungary, and Prussia. The Battle of Burkersdorf was fought on July 21, 1762, during the Seven Years' War. Following Germany's defeat in World War II, it became again part of Poland.
