= Pogorzała =

- Village
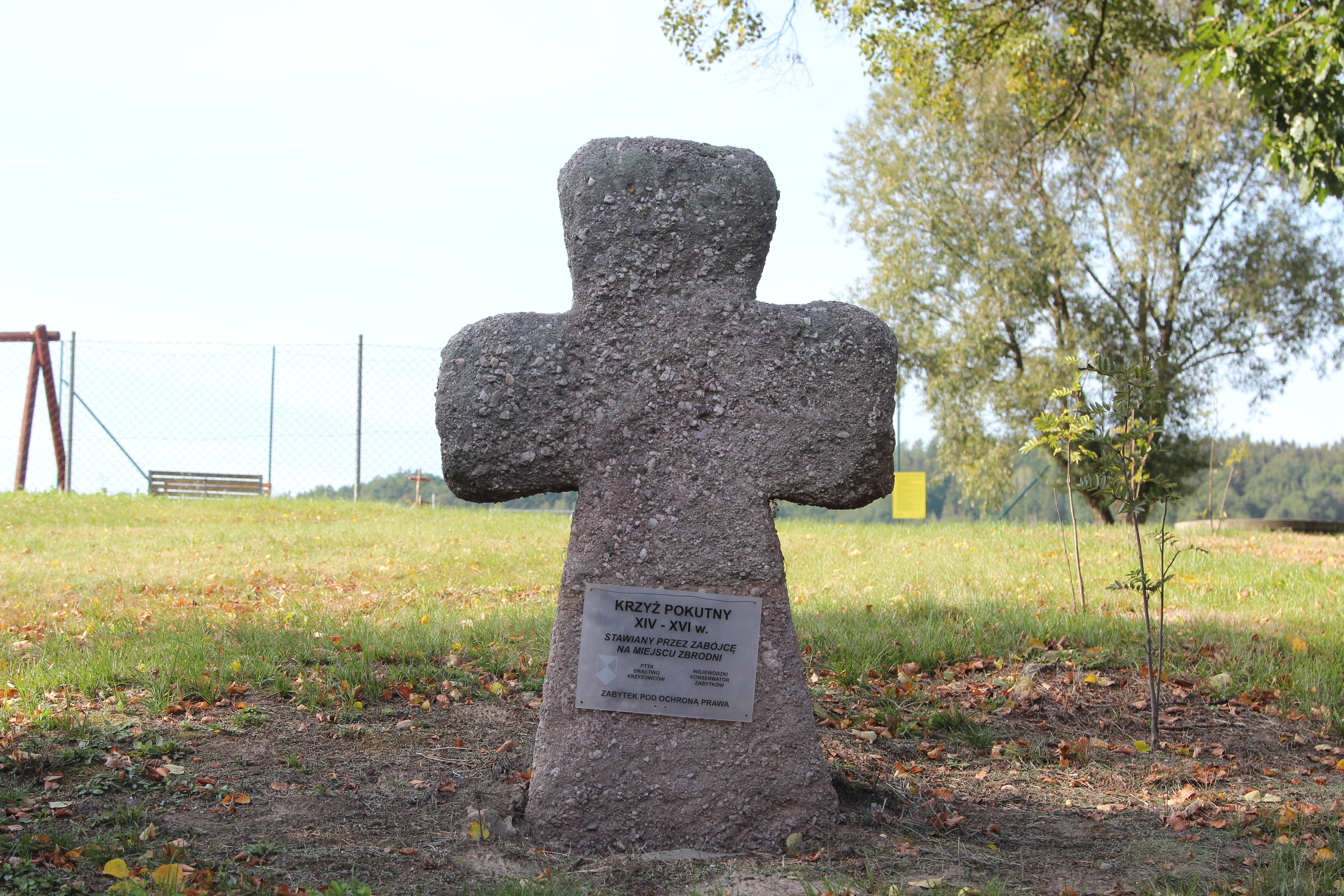
- Stone cross

- Location within Poland
- Coordinates: 50°48′22″N 16°21′49″E
- Country: Poland
- Voivodeship: Lower Silesian
- County: Świdnica
- Gmina: Gmina Świdnica

Pogorzała [pɔɡɔˈʐawa] is a village in the administrative district of Gmina Świdnica, within Świdnica County, Lower Silesian Voivodeship, in south-western Poland.
