= Gogołów =

Gogołów may refer to the following places in Poland:

- Gogołów, Lower Silesian Voivodeship (south-west Poland)
- Gogołów, Subcarpathian Voivodeship (south-east Poland)
