= Lutomia Górna =

- Village
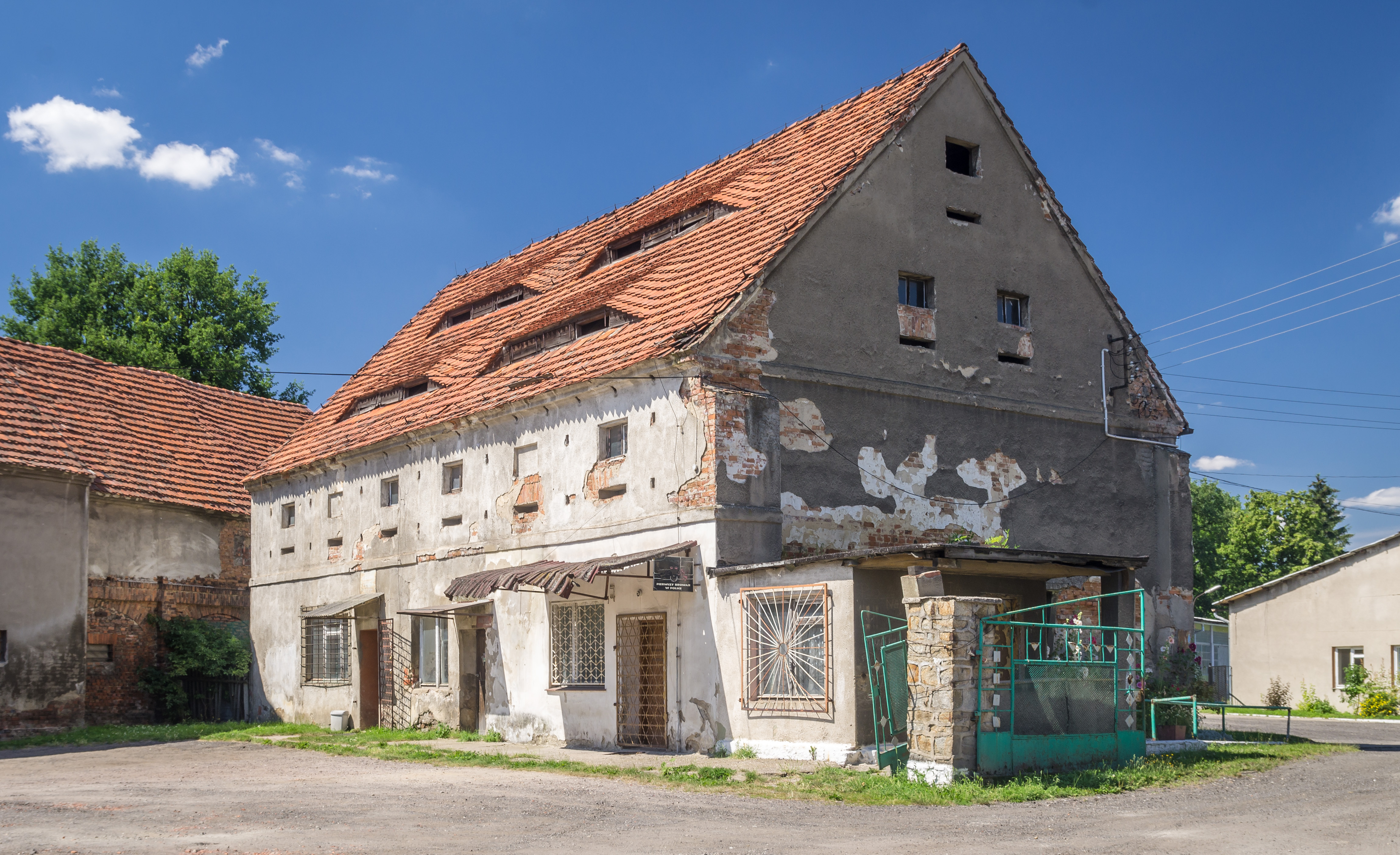

- Location within Poland
- Coordinates: 50°45′08″N 16°31′08″E
- Country: Poland
- Voivodeship: Lower Silesian
- County: Świdnica
- Gmina: Gmina Świdnica

Lutomia Górna [luˈtɔmja ˈɡurna] is a village in the administrative district of Gmina Świdnica, within Świdnica County, Lower Silesian Voivodeship, in south-western Poland.
