= Niegoszów =

- Village
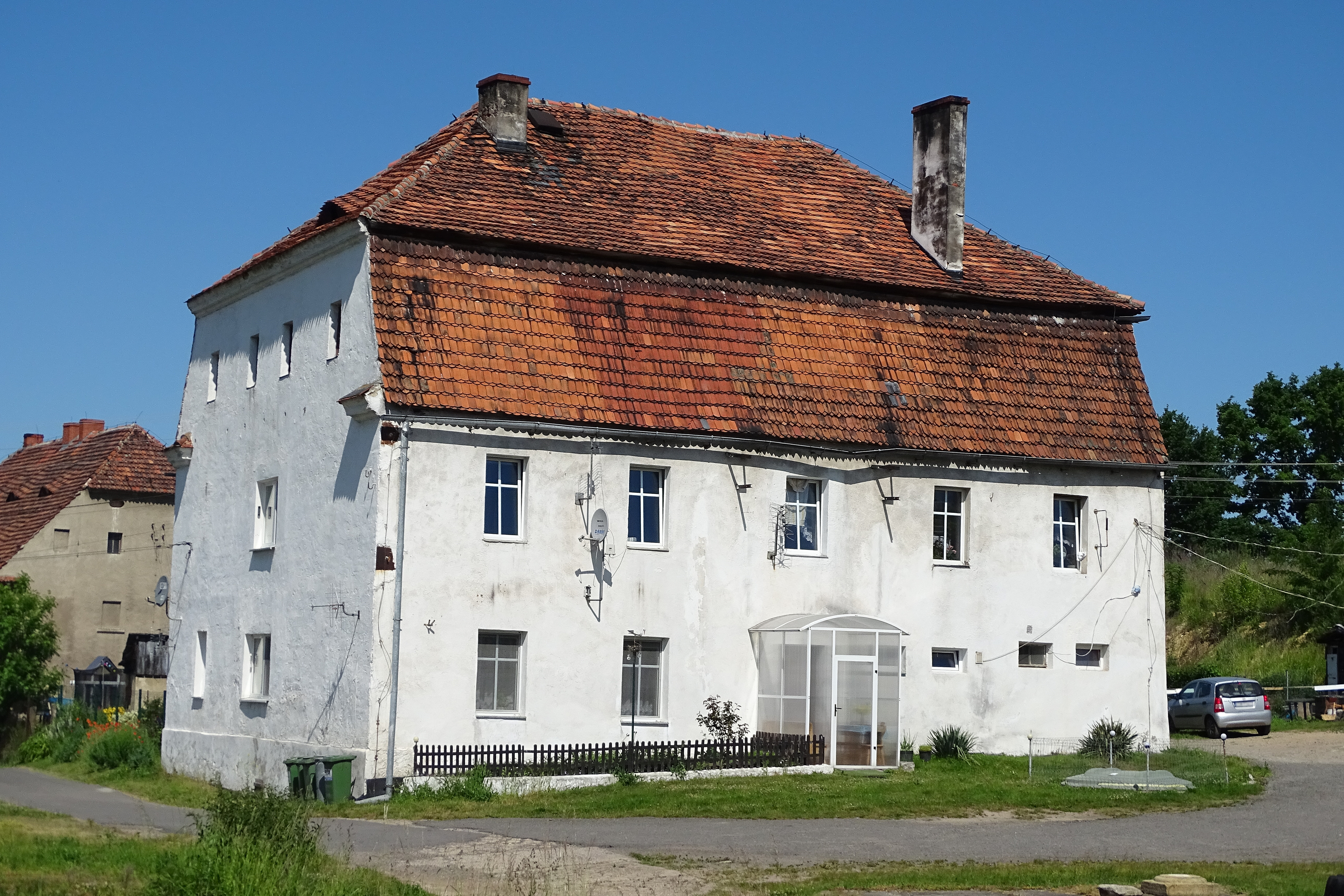
- House No. 3 in Niegoszów

- Location within Poland
- Coordinates: 50°52′46″N 16°31′15″E
- Country: Poland
- Voivodeship: Lower Silesian
- County: Świdnica
- Gmina: Gmina Świdnica

Niegoszów [ɲɛˈɡɔʂuf] (German: Nitschendorf) is a village in the administrative district of Gmina Świdnica, within Świdnica County, Lower Silesian Voivodeship, in south-western Poland.
