= Bojanice, Lower Silesian Voivodeship =

Bojanice
- Village
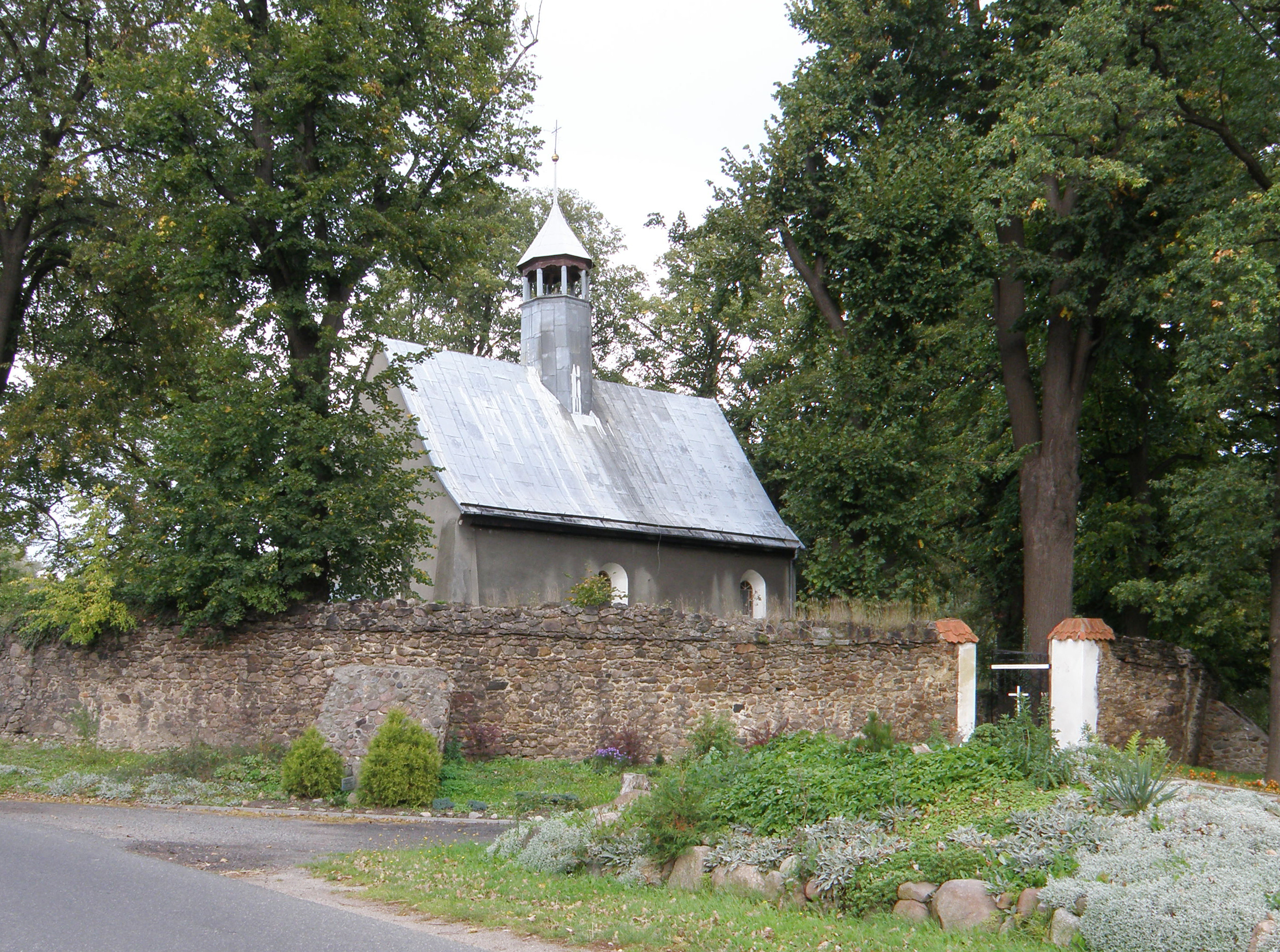

- Location within Poland
- Coordinates: 50°46′31″N 16°30′03″E
- Country: Poland
- Voivodeship: Lower Silesian
- County: Świdnica
- Gmina: Gmina Świdnica

Bojanice [bɔjaˈnit͡sɛ] is a village in the administrative district of Gmina Świdnica, within Świdnica County, Lower Silesian Voivodeship, in south-western Poland.
