= Gogołów, Lower Silesian Voivodeship =

Gogołów
- Village
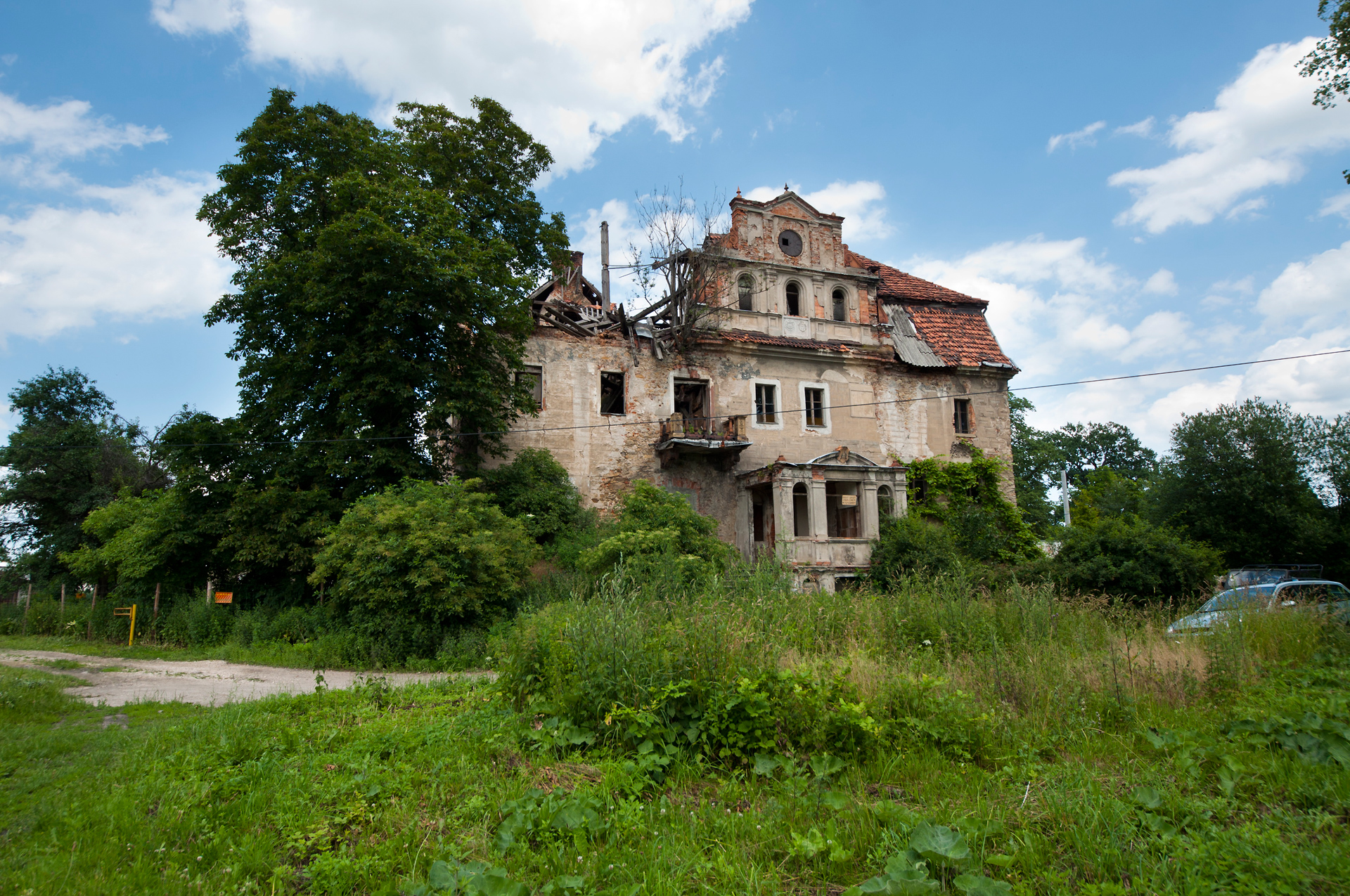
- Ruiny dworu w Gogołowie

- Location within Poland
- Coordinates: 50°49′50″N 16°35′17″E
- Country: Poland
- Voivodeship: Lower Silesian
- County: Świdnica
- Gmina: Gmina Świdnica

Gogołów [ɡɔˈɡɔwuf] is a village in the administrative district of Gmina Świdnica, within Świdnica County, Lower Silesian Voivodeship, in south-western Poland.
