= Makowice, Lower Silesian Voivodeship =

Makowice
- Village
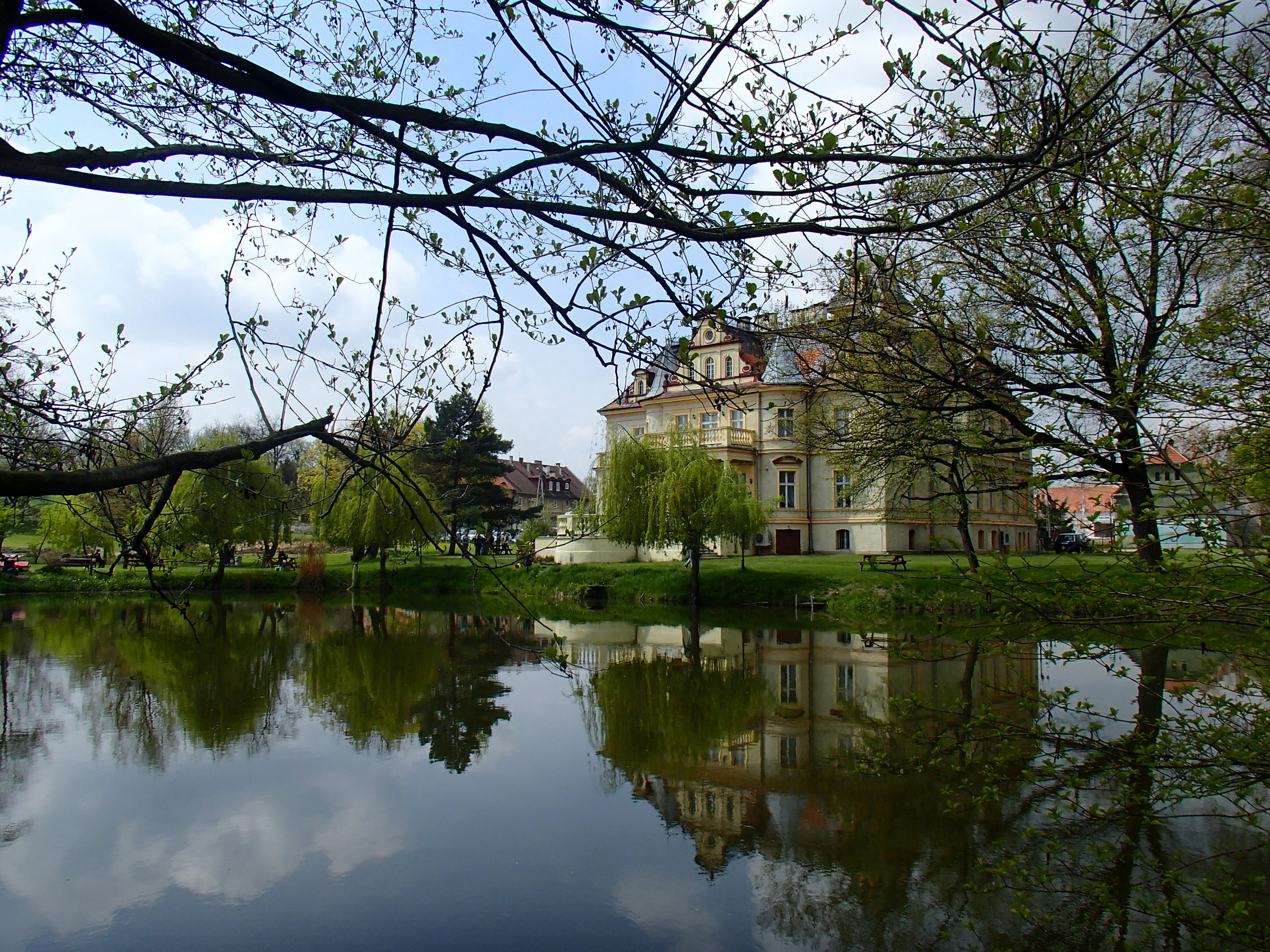
- Palace

- Location within Poland
- Coordinates: 50°48′32″N 16°30′18″E
- Country: Poland
- Voivodeship: Lower Silesian
- County: Świdnica
- Gmina: Gmina Świdnica

Makowice [makɔˈvit͡sɛ] is a village in the administrative district of Gmina Świdnica, within Świdnica County, Lower Silesian Voivodeship, in south-western Poland.
