= Battle of Burkersdorf (1762) =

Battle during the Seven Years' War

- Part of the Third Silesian War (Seven Years' War)
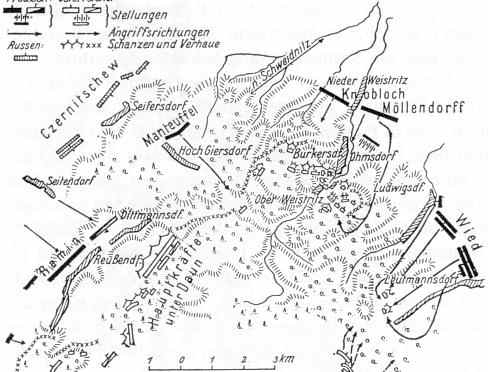
Date	21 July 1762
Location	Burkersdorf, present-day Poland 50°47′35″N 16°27′58″E
Result	Prusso-Russian victory

Belligerents
(Kingdom of Prussia) Prussia Russia	(Habsburg monarchy) Austria

Commanders and leaders
Frederick the Great	Leopold Joseph von Daun

Strength
23,000	20,000

Casualties and losses
1,600 killed or wounded	3,000 killed, wounded, captured, or deserted

Frederick the Great
current battle
First Silesian War
Second Silesian War
Third Silesian War

The Battle of Burkersdorf took place on 21 July 1762 during the Third Silesian War (part of the Seven Years' War). A Prussian army of 23,000 men fought an Austrian army of around 20,000 men.

After the death of Elizabeth of Russia, czarina of Russia, her nephew Peter III came to the throne. Peter was a great admirer of Frederick the Great and all things Prussian, and Frederick used this to his advantage. Peter promptly withdrew his army from the war, abandoned Russian-occupied East Prussia, and signed a treaty of peace with Frederick. Peter then sent a force to aid the Prussian army in the campaign against the Austrians.

Peter's reign was short-lived, however, as his wife Catherine the Great seized the throne, and he died shortly afterwards. Catherine withdrew from the war and sent orders for Count Zakhar Tchernyshov aiding the Prussians to withdraw.

The Austrian army was not aware of the exit of the Russian forces until Frederick began the battle.

Frederick attacked and won, and the Russian force returned home. Catherine's attempts to resume the war against Prussia were in vain, as peace talks were already being initiated at Hubertsberg.
