= Panków =

- Village
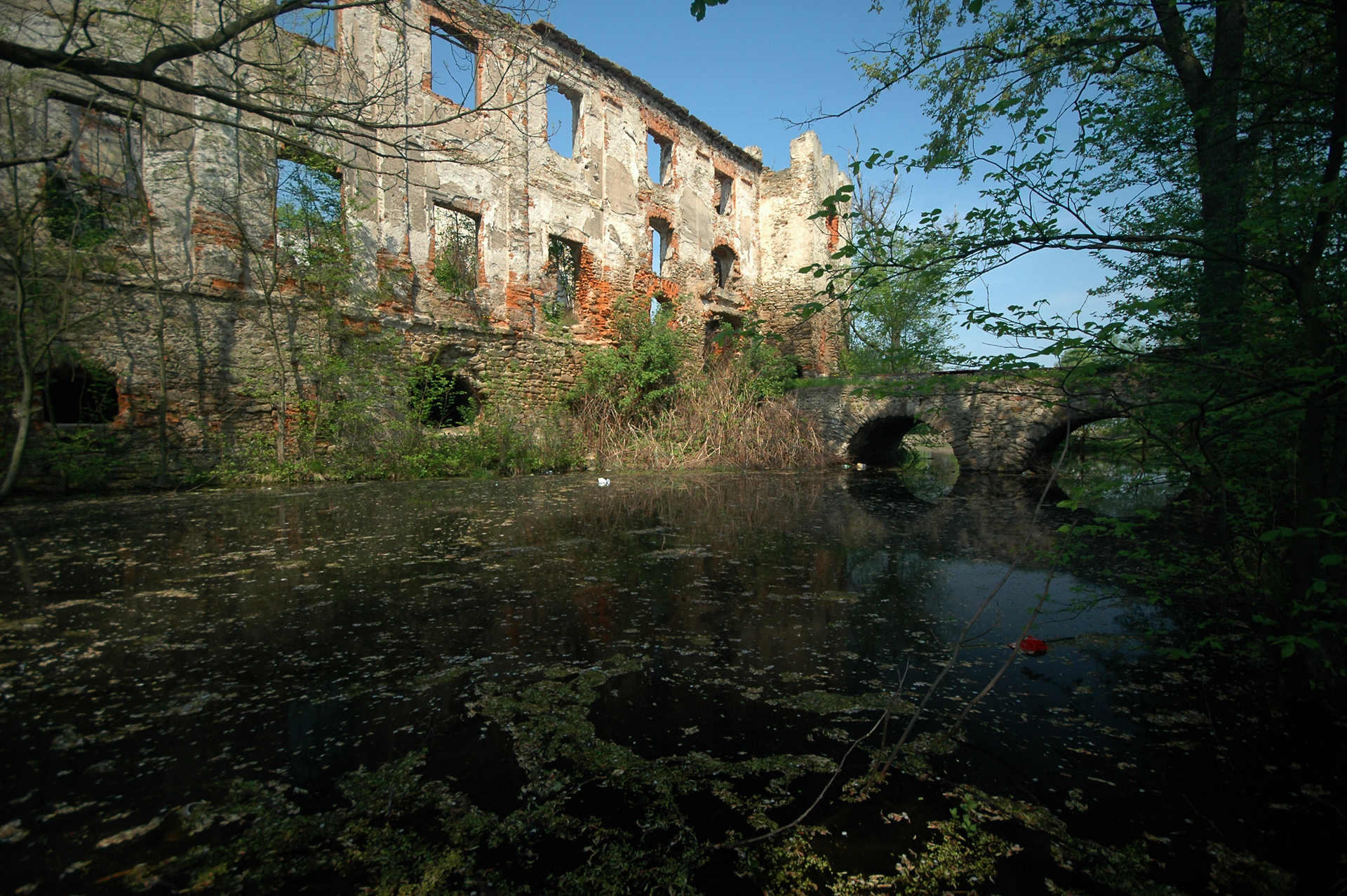
- Former palace

- Location within Poland
- Coordinates: 50°53′56″N 16°31′51″E
- Country: Poland
- Voivodeship: Lower Silesian
- County: Świdnica
- Gmina: Gmina Świdnica

Panków (Polish: [ˈpaŋkuf]) is a village in the administrative district of Gmina Świdnica, within Świdnica County, Lower Silesian Voivodeship, in south-western Poland.
