= Lodewijk Prins =

Dutch chess player

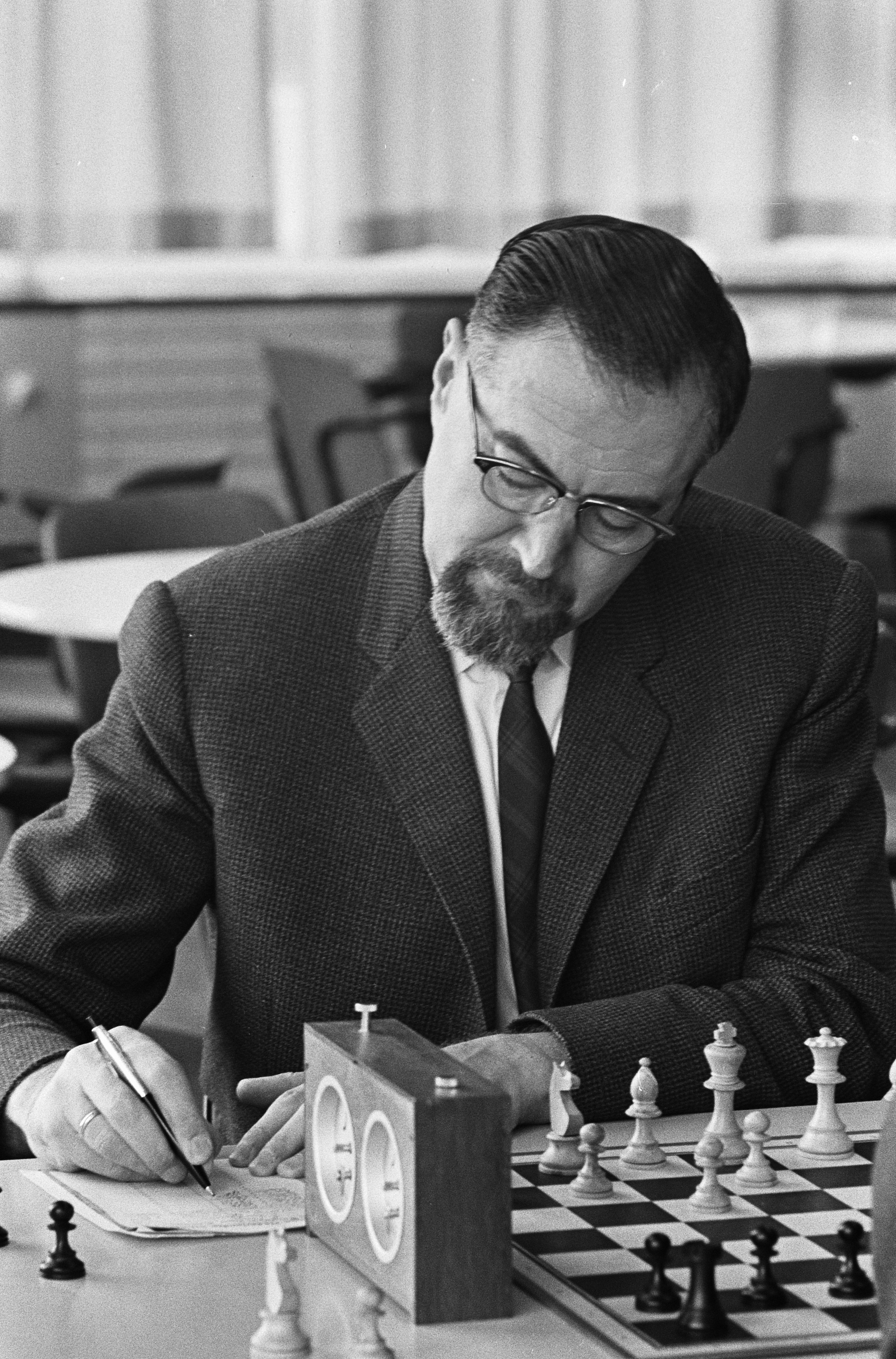
- Prins in 1965

Personal information
- Born: 27 January 1913 Amsterdam, Netherlands
- Died: 11 November 1999 (aged 86)

Chess career
- Country: Netherlands
- Title: Honorary Grandmaster (1982); International Master (1950)
- Peak rating: 2410 (July 1971)

Lodewijk Prins (27 January 1913, Amsterdam – 11 November 1999) was a Dutch chess player and referee of chess competitions.

== Biography ==
Prins was awarded the International Master title in 1950, and was made an International Arbiter in 1960. In 1982 FIDE made him an honorary Grandmaster.

Prins represented the Netherlands twelve times in all Chess Olympiads from 1937 to 1968. He won two individual silver medals (1939, 1950) and one bronze (1968).

At the beginning of World War II (1939–1940), he played in tournaments in the Netherlands. In 1940, he won jointly with Salo Landau and Nicolaas Cortlever in Leeuwarden, took 2nd, behind Max Euwe, in Amsterdam (VVGA), and tied for 3rd–4th in Amsterdam (VAS, Hans Kmoch won). After the German invasion of the Netherlands in May 1940, his name did not appear in any tournament in the occupied Netherlands because of his Jewish origin. After the war, he took first place at Gijón in 1947, at Hoogovens Beverwijk in 1948 and at Madrid 1951 with 12.5/17, ahead of Herman Steiner, Hermann Pilnik, and Ossip Bernstein. Prins qualified for the 1952 Interzonal and was Dutch Champion in 1965.

Despite his strong performance at the 1968 Chess Olympiad in Lugano, where he scored 9/12 and gained a bronze medal, Prins was not selected for the Dutch team at the 1970 Chess Olympiad. Subsequently, he broke from the Dutch Chess Federation and played only occasionally after this. His final tournament was a large open in Cattolica, Italy in 1993, where he finished in the middle of the field. Prins coauthored several chess books with Max Euwe, including the 1949 biography of Capablanca Het Schaakphenomeen Capablanca and several tournament books.
