= Wieruszów, Lower Silesian Voivodeship =

Wieruszów
- Village
- Location within Poland
- Coordinates: 50°47′05″N 16°31′13″E
- Country: Poland
- Voivodeship: Lower Silesian
- County: Świdnica
- Gmina: Gmina Świdnica

Wieruszów [vjɛˈruʂuf] is a village in the administrative district of Gmina Świdnica, within Świdnica County, Lower Silesian Voivodeship, in south-western Poland.
