= Boleścin, Świdnica County =

Boleścin
- Village
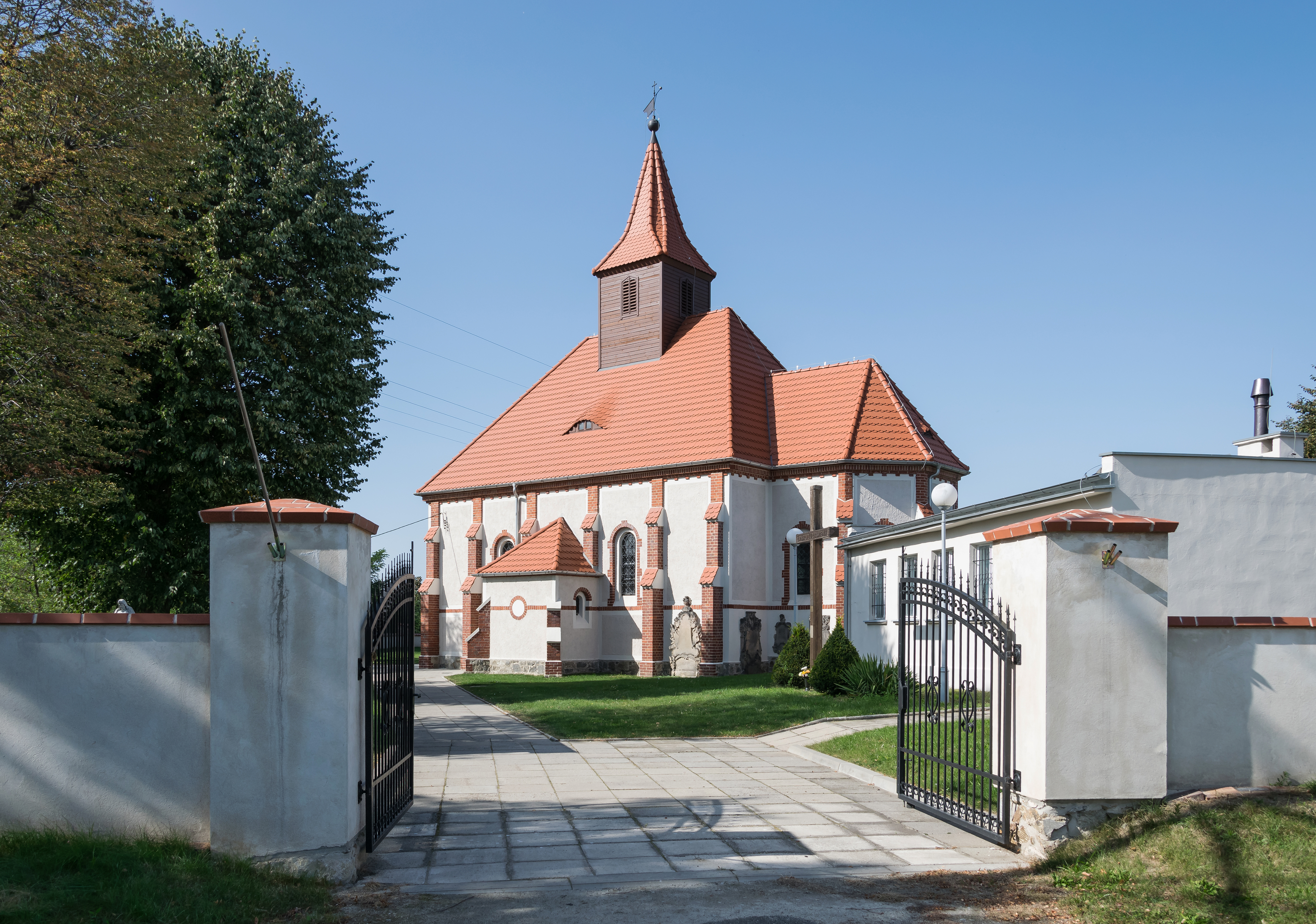
- Church of Saint Joseph in Boleścin

- Location within Poland
- Coordinates: 50°49′09″N 16°31′41″E
- Country: Poland
- Voivodeship: Lower Silesian
- County: Świdnica
- Gmina: Gmina Świdnica

Boleścin [bɔˈlɛɕt͡ɕin] (German: Pilzen bei Schweidnitz) is a village in the administrative district of Gmina Świdnica, within Świdnica County, Lower Silesian Voivodeship, in south-western Poland.
