= Pszenno =

- Village
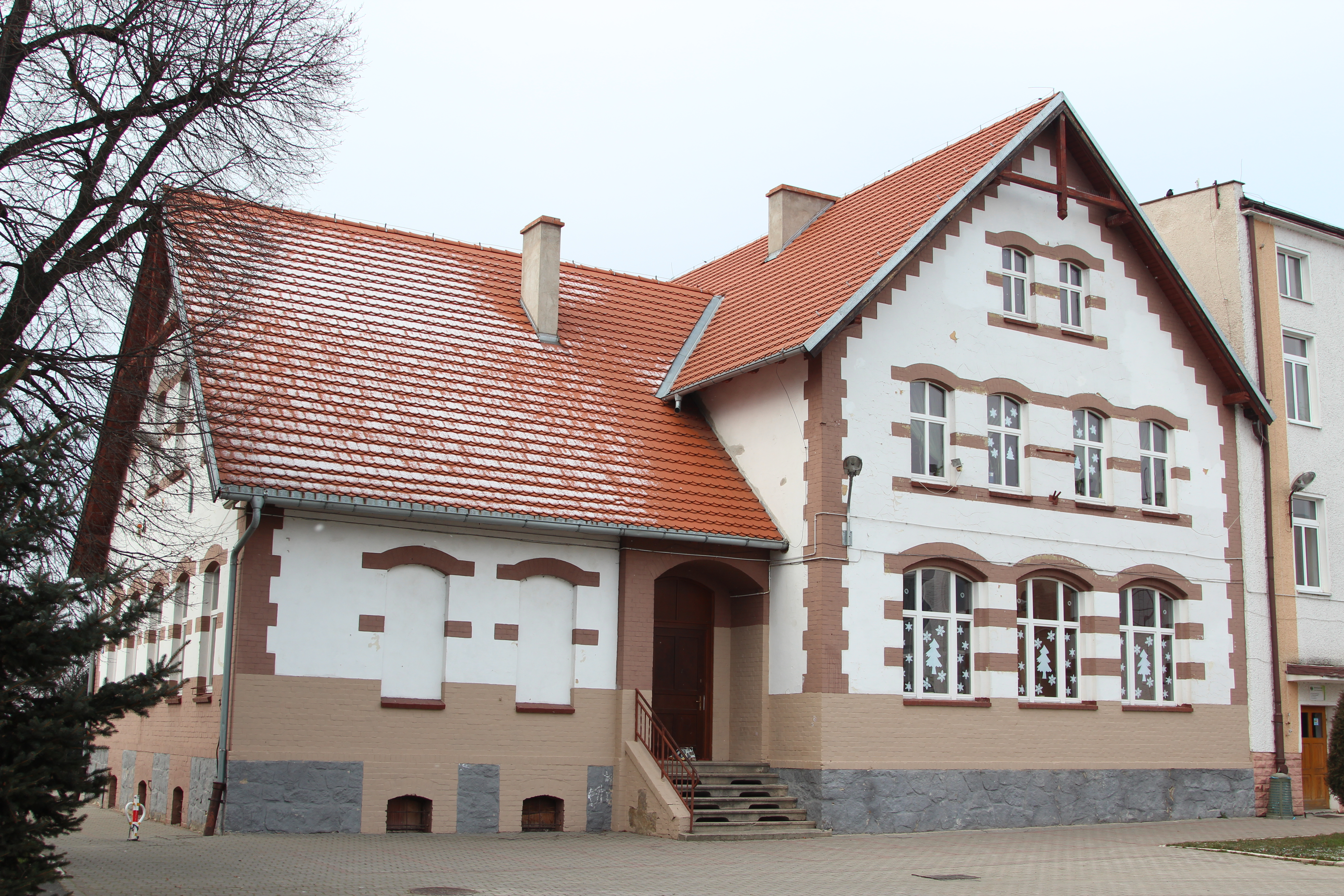
- Nicolaus Copernicus Elementary School in Pszenno

- Location within Poland
- Coordinates: 50°51′23″N 16°32′15″E
- Country: Poland
- Voivodeship: Lower Silesian
- County: Świdnica
- Gmina: Gmina Świdnica
- Established: 13th century
- Time zone: UTC+1 (CET)
  - Summer (DST): UTC+2 (CEST)
- Vehicle registration: DSW

Pszenno [ˈpʂɛnnɔ] (German: Weizenrodau) is a village in the administrative district of Gmina Świdnica, within Świdnica County, Lower Silesian Voivodeship, in south-western Poland.

The most notable sights of the village include the medieval Saint Nicholas church and a museum dedicated to sugar production, which is located at the local sugar refinery.

== History ==
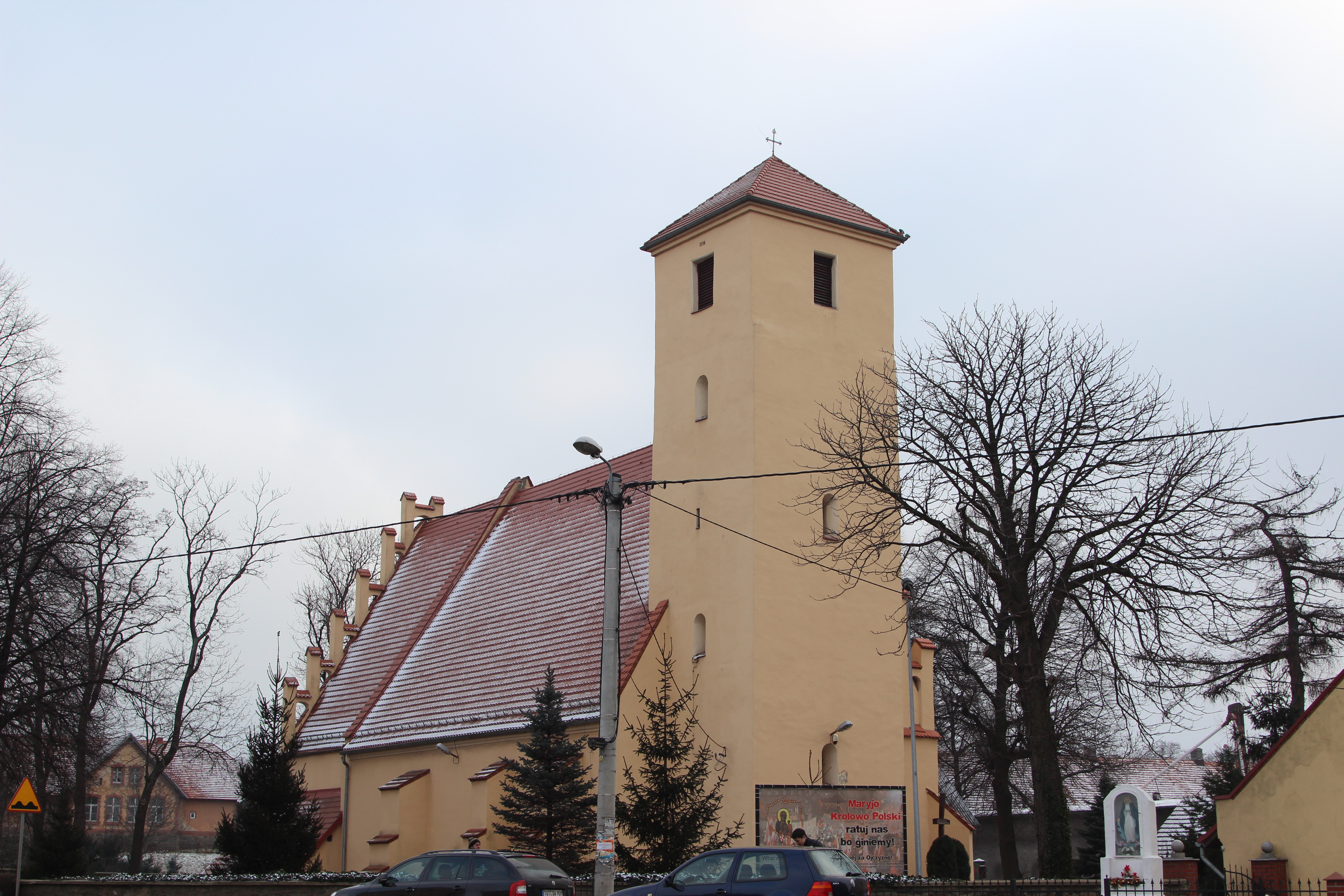
Saint Nicholas church

Weizenrodau, formerly known as Weisinrod or Wisyngerode, was established under German town law in 1243 by Johannes von Würben in the Duchy of Silesia. The village's church was first mentioned in 1335 as ecclesia de Weynsinrod in the tithe register of the apostolic nuncio Galhardus. Following the partition of the Duchy of Breslau (Wrocław) in 1290–91, Weizenrodau became part of the newly established Duchy of Schweidnitz (Świdnica), which passed by inheritance to the Bohemian Crown following the death of Duke Bolko II the Small in 1368.

The German name Weizenrodau literally means wheat uprooting. The ancestors of the Watzenrode family of Prussia based their family name on the village since this is where they originated.

Since 1645, the Evangelical inhabitants of the town belonged to the Church of Peace in nearby Schweidnitz, while, until 1773, the Catholics belonged to the Jesuit Church of Schweidnitz. The village was annexed by Prussia in 1741, and was administratively located in the Schweidnitz County (Landkreis Schweidnitz) since. A sugar factory was established in the village in the early 19th century.

In 1874 the local civil registry was established. During World War II the E12001 forced labour subcamp of the Stalag VIII-B/344 prisoner-of-war camp and the 12001 forced labour subcamp of the Stalag VIII-A POW camp were located in the village. After Germany's defeat in the war, in 1945, the village was annexed by Poland and renamed to Pszenno. The Polish name comes from the word pszenica, which means wheat.

== Economy ==
There is a sugar refinery in the village.

== Transport ==
The Polish National road 35 runs through the village.

== Education ==
The Nicolaus Copernicus Elementary School (Szkoła Podstawowa im. Mikołaja Kopernika) is located in Pszenno.

== Sports ==
The local football club is Cukrownik Pszenno. It competes in the lower leagues.

== Famous residents ==
- Watzenrode Family went from the village to Toruń (then Thorn) in the 1350s.
- birthplace of the mother of astronomer Nicolaus Copernicus
