= Grodziszcze, Świdnica County =

Grodziszcze
- Village
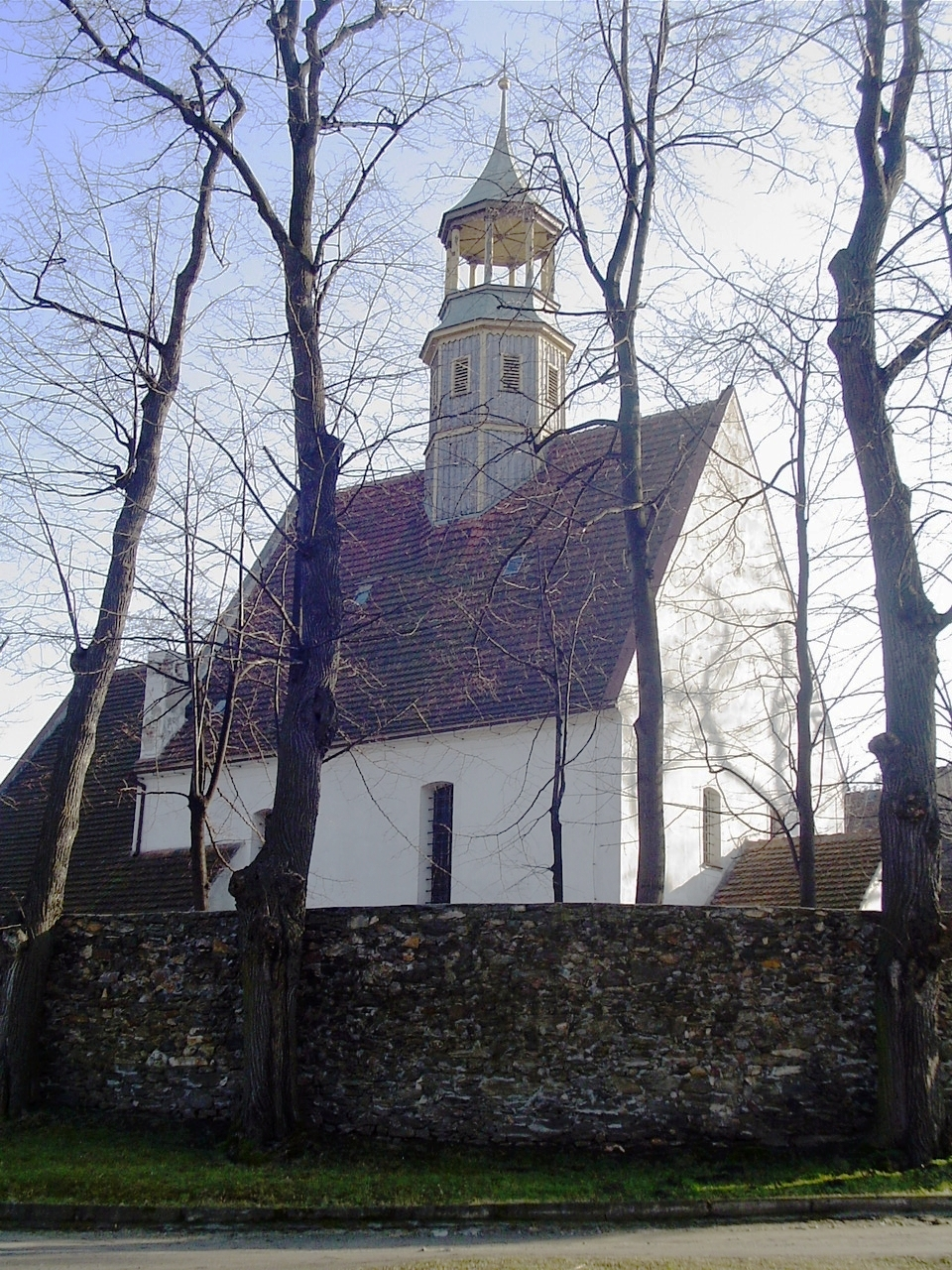
- Church of Saint Anne

- Location within Poland
- Coordinates: 50°47′55″N 16°33′24″E
- Country: Poland
- Voivodeship: Lower Silesian
- County: Świdnica
- Gmina: Gmina Świdnica
- Population: 891
- Time zone: UTC+1 (CET)
  - Summer (DST): UTC+2 (CEST)
- Vehicle registration: DSW

Grodziszcze [ɡrɔˈd͡ʑiʂt͡ʂɛ] is a village in the administrative district of Gmina Świdnica, within Świdnica County, Lower Silesian Voivodeship, in south-western Poland.

== History ==
In the 11th and 12th centuries, the village, initially known as Gramolin, was the seat of a castellany within medieval Poland, which was later moved to the nearby city of Świdnica.

During World War II, the Germans operated a forced labour camp for Jewish men in the village.
