= Gmina Świdnica, Lower Silesian Voivodeship =

Gmina Świdnica Świdnica Commune
- Gmina
- Coat of arms
- Interactive map of Gmina Świdnica
- Coordinates (Świdnica): 50°50′39″N 16°25′27″E
- Country: Poland
- Voivodeship: Lower Silesian
- County: Świdnica
- Seat: Świdnica
- Sołectwos: Bojanice, Boleścin, Burkatów, Bystrzyca Dolna, Bystrzyca Górna, Gogołów, Grodziszcze, Jagodnik, Jakubów, Komorów, Krzczonów, Krzyżowa, Lubachów, Lutomia Dolna, Lutomia Górna, Makowice, Miłochów, Modliszów, Mokrzeszów, Niegoszów, Opoczka, Panków, Pogorzała, Pszenno, Słotwina, Stachowice, Sulisławice, Wieruszów, Wilków, Wiśniowa, Witoszów Dolny, Witoszów Górny, Zawiszów

Area
  - Total: 208.28 km^{2} (80.42 sq mi)

Population (2019-06-30)
  - Total: 17,222
  - Density: 82.687/km^{2} (214.16/sq mi)
- Website: http://www.gmina.swidnica.pl/

Gmina Świdnica is a rural gmina (administrative district) in Świdnica County, Lower Silesian Voivodeship, in south-western Poland. Its seat is the town of Świdnica, although the town is not part of the territory of the gmina.

The gmina covers an area of 208.28 square kilometres (80.4 sq mi), and as of 2019 its total population is 17,222.

== Neighbouring gminas ==
Gmina Świdnica is bordered by the gminas of Dzierżoniów, Jaworzyna Śląska, Marcinowice, Walim and Żarów.

== Villages ==
The gmina contains the villages of Bojanice, Boleścin, Burkatów, Bystrzyca Dolna, Bystrzyca Górna, Gogołów, Grodziszcze, Jagodnik, Jakubów, Komorów, Krzczonów, Krzyżowa, Lubachów, Lutomia Dolna, Lutomia Górna, Lutomia Mała, Makowice, Miłochów, Modliszów, Mokrzeszów, Niegoszów, Opoczka, Panków, Pogorzała, Pszenno, Słotwina, Stachowice, Stachowiczki, Sulisławice, Wieruszów, Wilków, Wiśniowa, Witoszów Dolny, Witoszów Górny, Zawiszów and Złoty Las.

== Twin towns – sister cities ==
Gmina Świdnica is twinned with:

- Ermont, France
- Lampertheim, Germany
- Maldegem, Belgium
- Zviahel, Ukraine
- Żukowo, Poland
