= Świdnica County =

Coordinates: 50°50′39″N 16°25′27″E

Świdnica County Powiat świdnicki
- County
- Flag Coat of arms

- Location within the voivodeship
- Country: Poland
- Voivodeship: Lower Silesian
- Seat: Świdnica
- Gminas: Total 8 (incl. 2 urban): Świdnica; Świebodzice; Gmina Dobromierz; Gmina Jaworzyna Śląska; Gmina Marcinowice; Gmina Strzegom; Gmina Świdnica; Gmina Żarów

Area
  - Total: 742.89 km^{2} (286.83 sq mi)

Population (2019-06-30)
  - Total: 157,178
  - Density: 211.58/km^{2} (547.98/sq mi)
  - Urban: 107,783
  - Rural: 49,395
- Car plates: DSW
- Website: www.powiat.swidnica.pl

Świdnica County (Polish: powiat świdnicki) is a unit of territorial administration and local government (powiat) in Lower Silesian Voivodeship, south-western Poland. It came into being on January 1, 1999, as a result of the Polish local government reforms passed in 1998. The county covers an area of 742.9 square kilometres (286.8 sq mi). Its administrative seat is Świdnica, and it also contains the towns of Świebodzice, Strzegom, Jaworzyna Śląska and Żarów.

As of 2019 the total population of the county is 157,178. The most populated towns are Świdnica with 57,041 inhabitants, Świebodzice with 22,793 inhabitants, and Strzegom with 16,106 inhabitants.

== Neighbouring counties ==
Świdnica County is bordered by Środa County to the north, Wrocław County to the north-east, Dzierżoniów County to the south, Wałbrzych County to the south-west and Jawor County to the north-west.

== Administrative divisions ==
The county is subdivided into eight gminas (two urban, three urban-rural and three rural). These are listed in the following table, in descending order of population.

Gmina	Type	Area (km^{2})	Population (2019)	Seat
Świdnica	urban	21.8	57,041	
Gmina Strzegom	urban-rural	144.7	25,775	Strzegom
Świebodzice	urban	30.4	22,793	
Gmina Świdnica	rural	208.3	17,222	Świdnica*
Gmina Żarów	urban-rural	88.0	12,412	Żarów
Gmina Jaworzyna Śląska	urban-rural	67.3	10,249	Jaworzyna Śląska
Gmina Marcinowice	rural	95.9	6,488	Marcinowice
Gmina Dobromierz	rural	86.5	5,198	Dobromierz
* seat not part of the gmina
