= Nysa Mała =

Little Neisse Kleine Neiße (German)
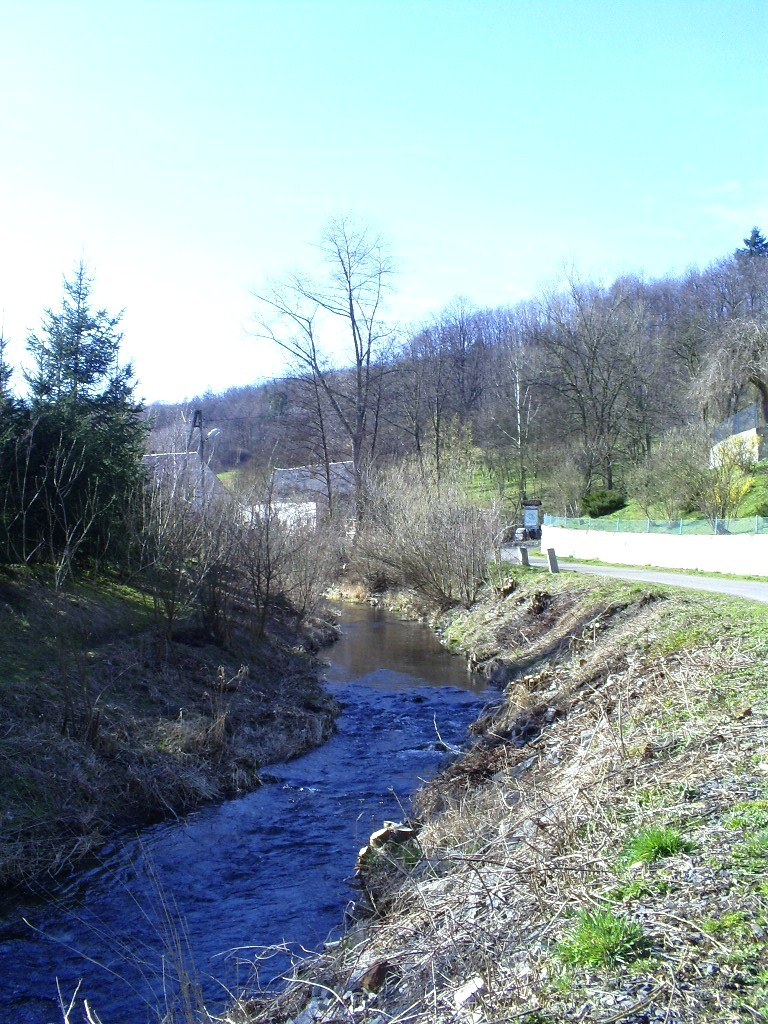
- Little Neisse after leaving the forest near Grobla
- Native name: Nysa Mała (Polish)

Location
- Country: Poland

Physical characteristics
- Source
  - location: Lipa
  - elevation: approx. 440
- Mouth
  - location: between Gniewków and Czernica into the Raging Neisse
  - coordinates: 51°00′14″N 16°12′34″E
  - elevation: approx. 210
- Length: approx. 19 km (12 mi)

Basin features
- Progression: Raging Neisse→ Kaczawa→ Oder→ Baltic Sea

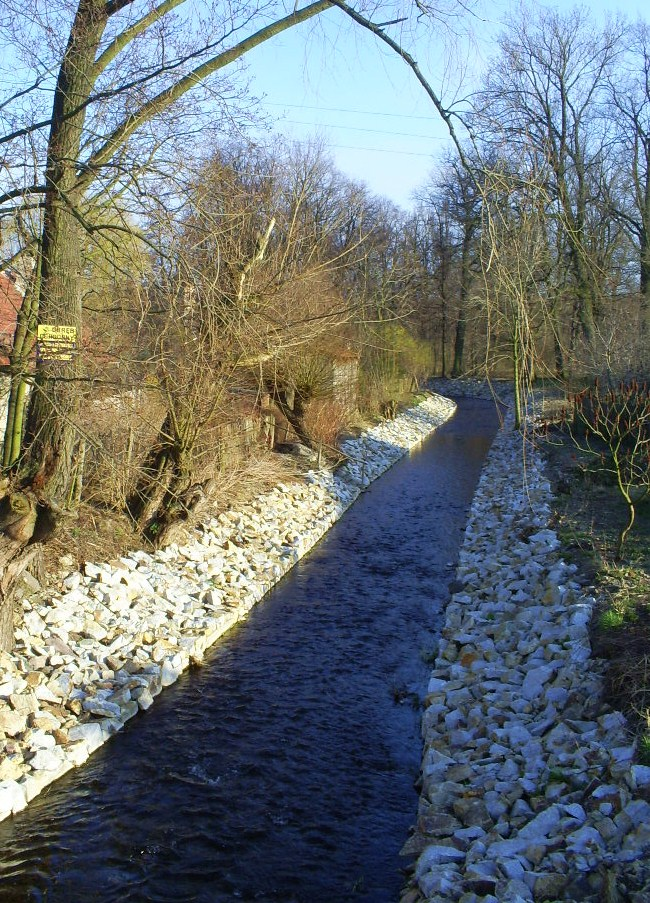
The river in Kwietniki

The Nysa Mała ("Little Neisse") is a river in Poland that is about 19 kilometres long, and is a left tributary of the Raging Neisse.

In the area of the foothills of the Sudetes it flows through the Chełmy Landscape Park.

The Little Neisse flows for much of its course through deciduous forests.

The entire course of the river is located south of Jawor, and north of Bolków and runs from west to east.

Between Gniewków and Czernica, the Little Neisse discharges into the Raging Neisse, the largest and most important tributary of the Kaczawa.

== See also ==
- Rivers of Poland

== Bibliography ==
- Słownik geografii turystycznej Sudetów, Volume 7 Kaczawskie , ed. Marek Staffa, Publisher I-BiS, Wroclaw, 2002, ISBN 9788385773474
