= Jugowa =

- Village
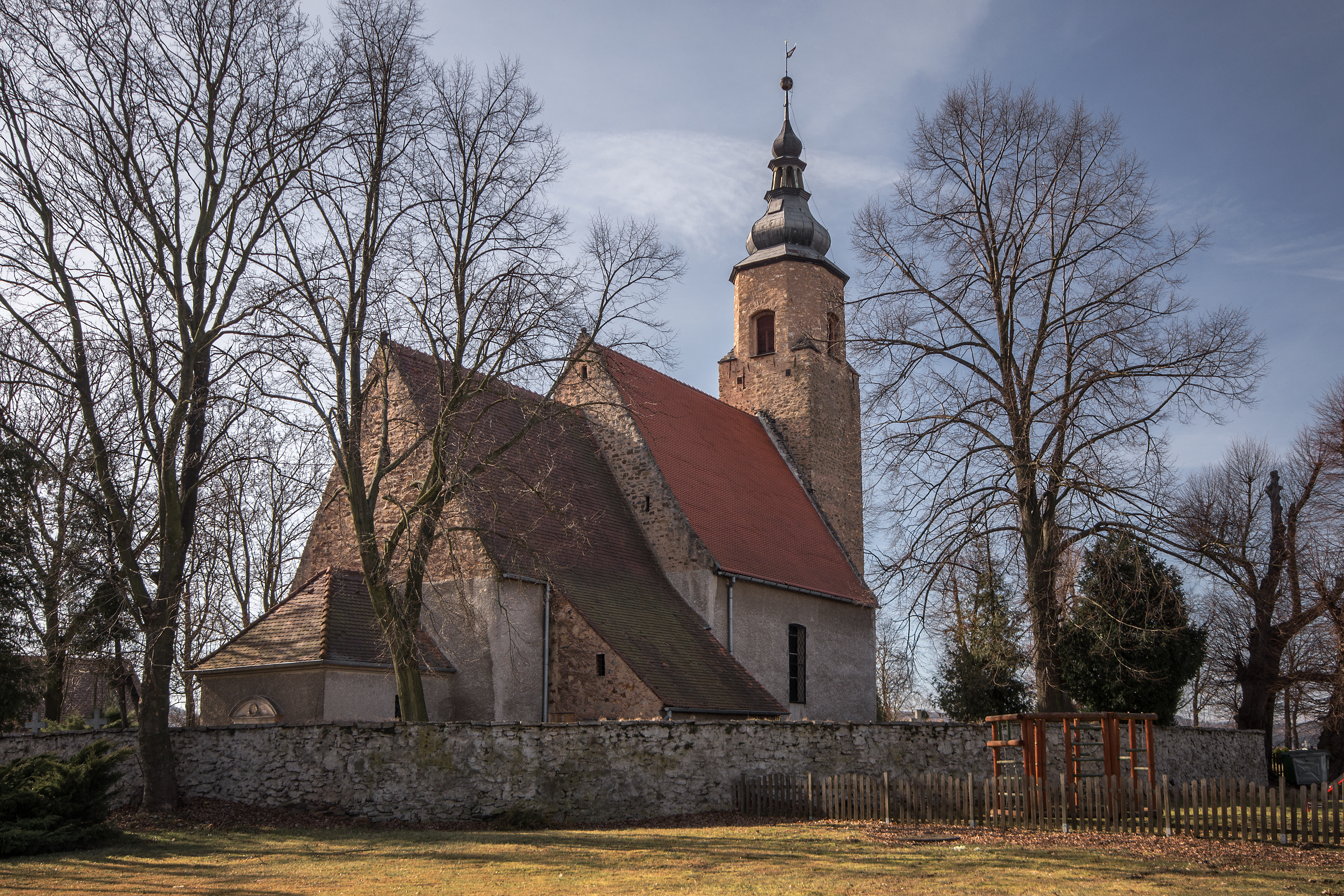
- SM Jugowa Kościół św Antoniego 2017

- Location within Poland
- Coordinates: 50°56′14″N 16°14′59″E
- Country: Poland
- Voivodeship: Lower Silesian
- County: Świdnica
- Gmina: Dobromierz

Jugowa [juˈɡɔva] is a village in the administrative district of Gmina Dobromierz, within Świdnica County, Lower Silesian Voivodeship, in south-western Poland.
