= Borów, Świdnica County =

Borów
- Village
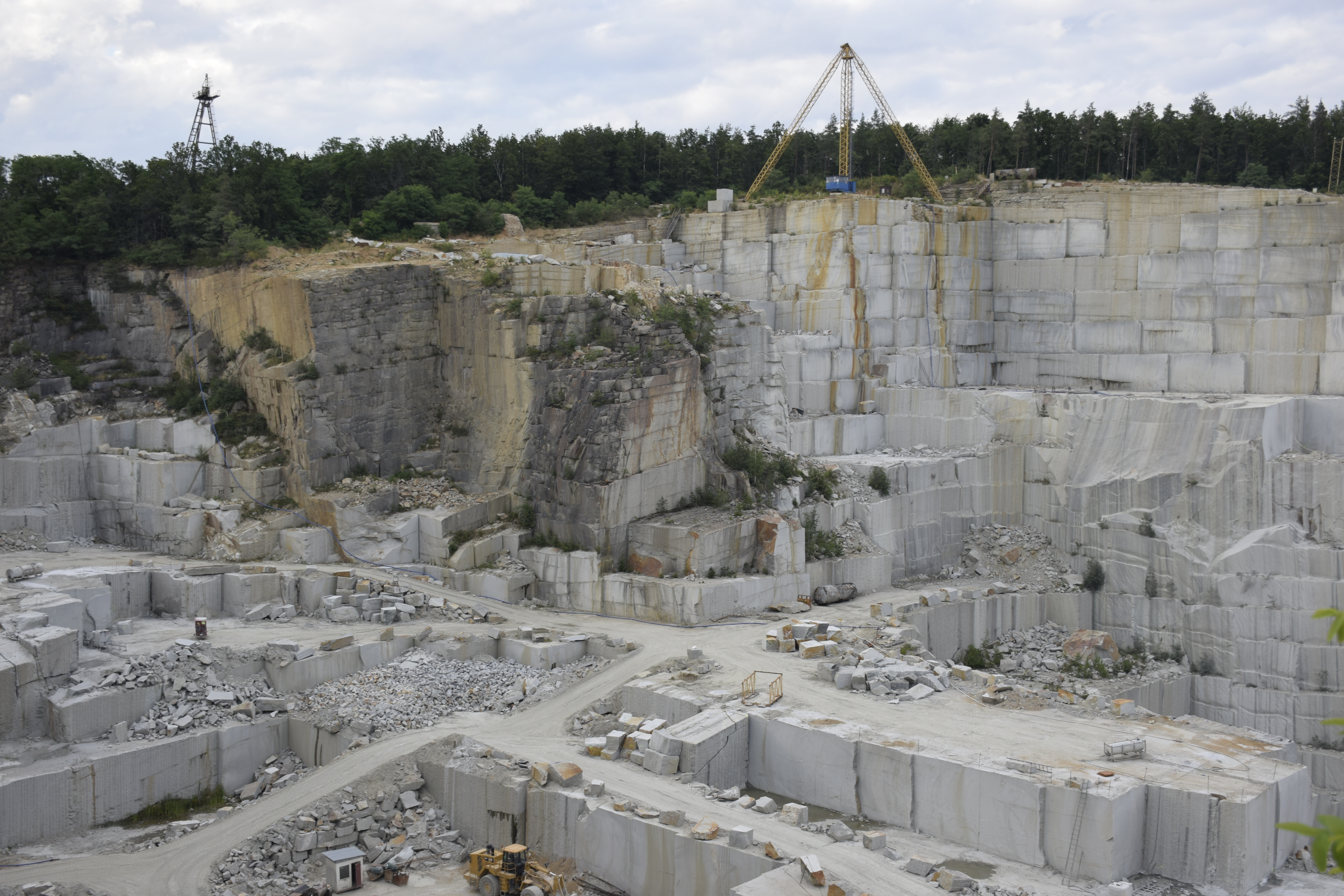
- Granite mine in Borów

- Location within Poland
- Coordinates: 50°58′52″N 16°14′35″E
- Country: Poland
- Voivodeship: Lower Silesian
- County: Świdnica
- Gmina: Dobromierz

Borów [ˈbɔruf] is a village in the administrative district of Gmina Dobromierz, within Świdnica County, Lower Silesian Voivodeship, in south-western Poland.

== Gallery ==
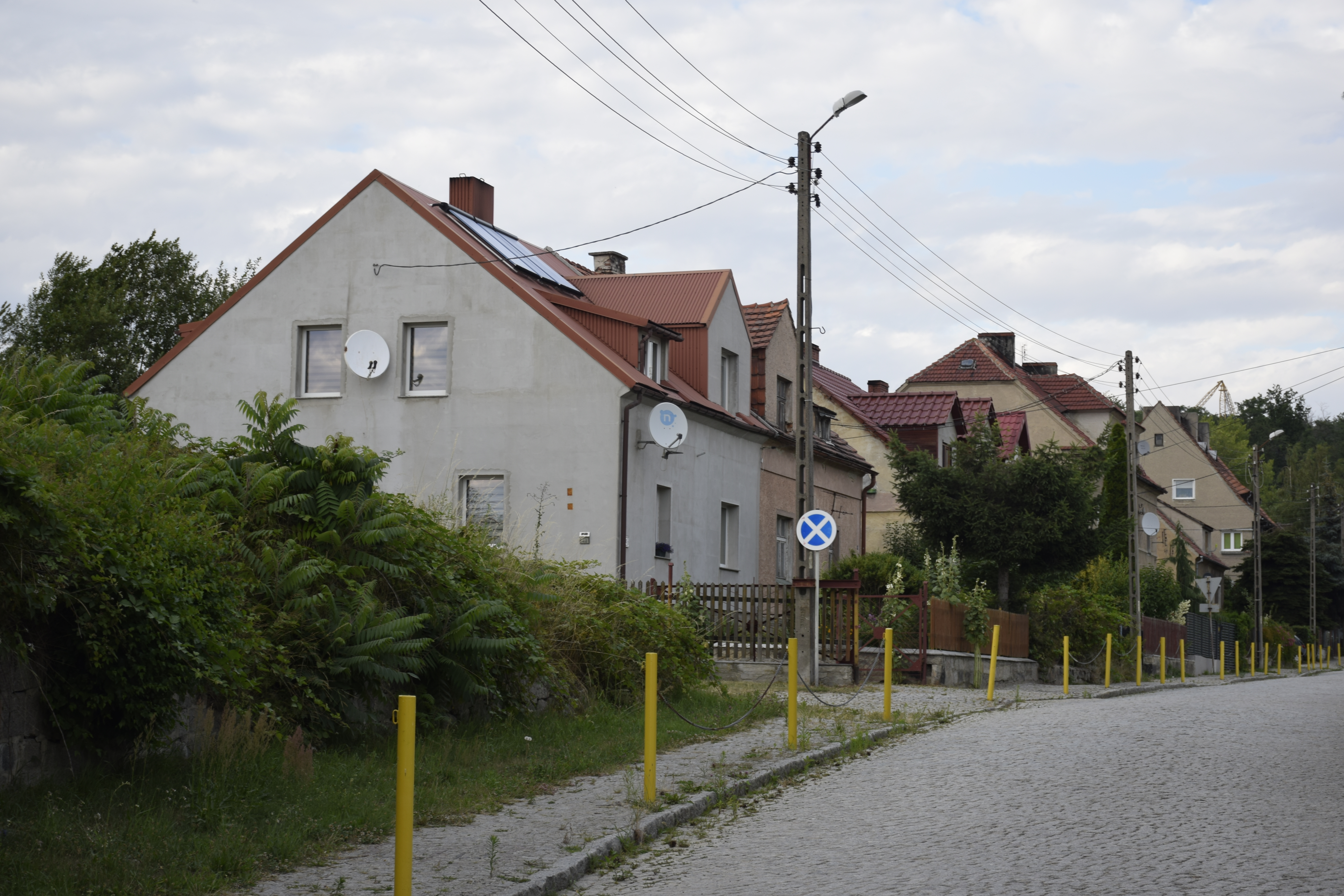
A street

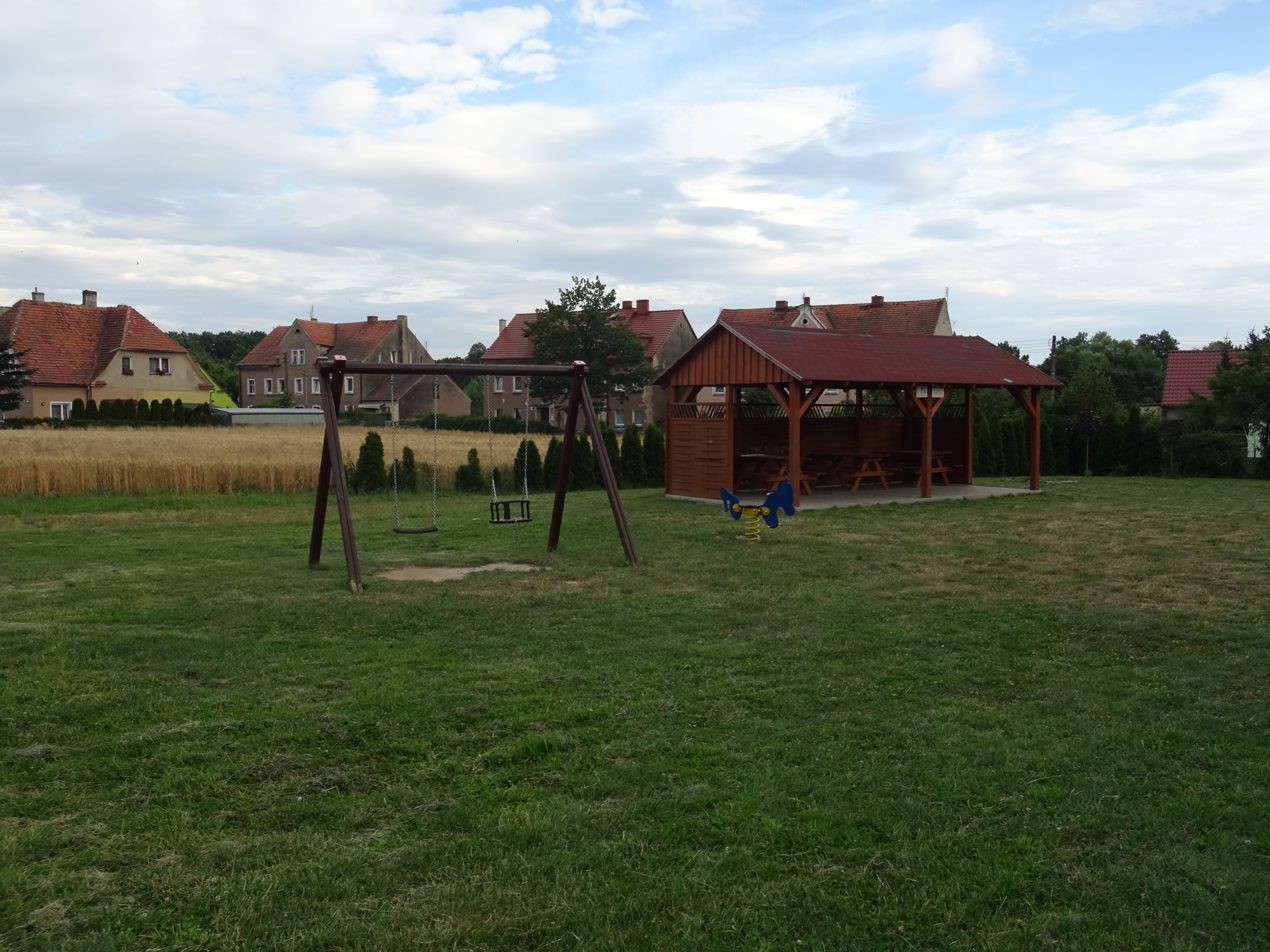
Children playground

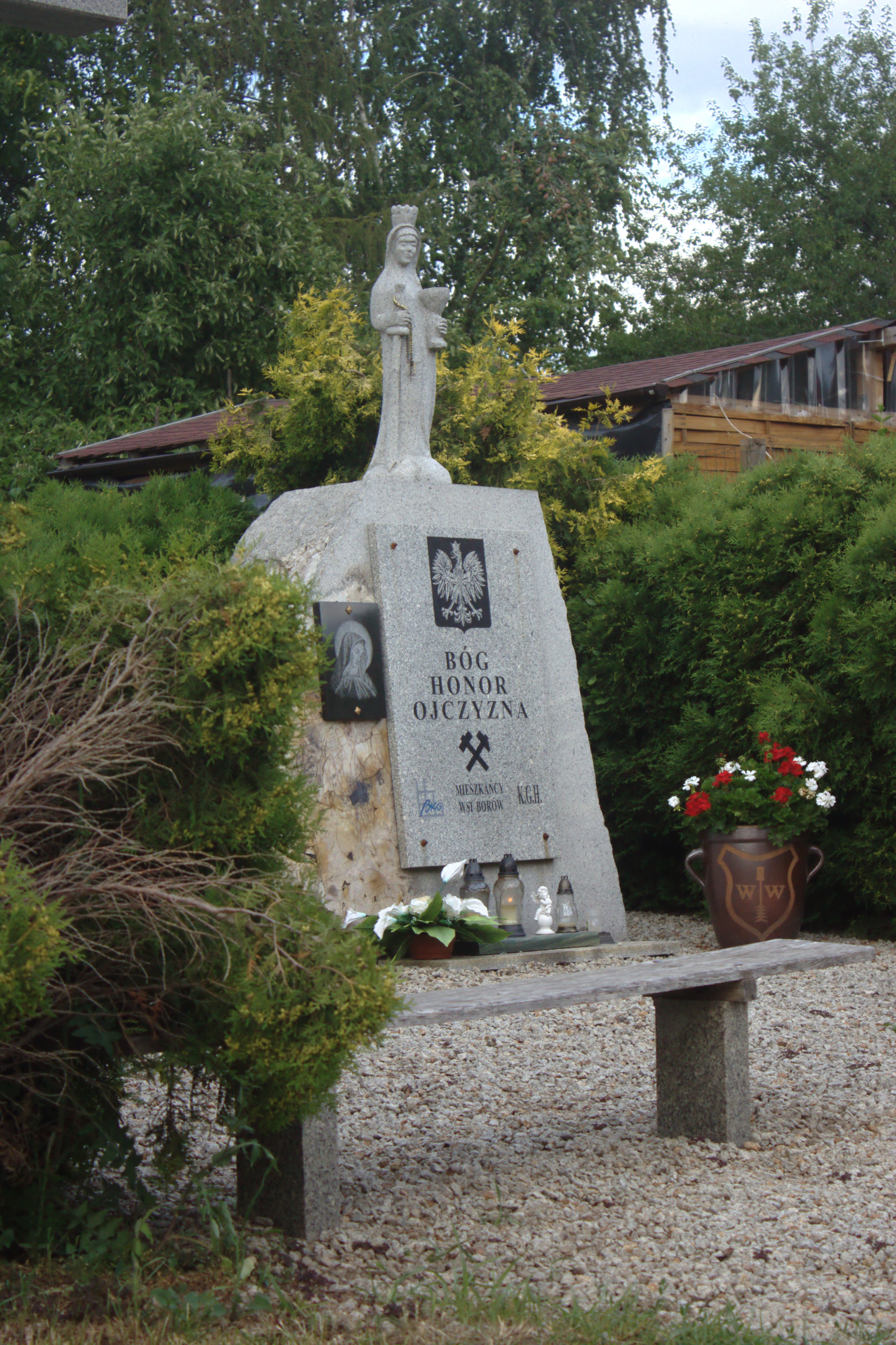
Memorial

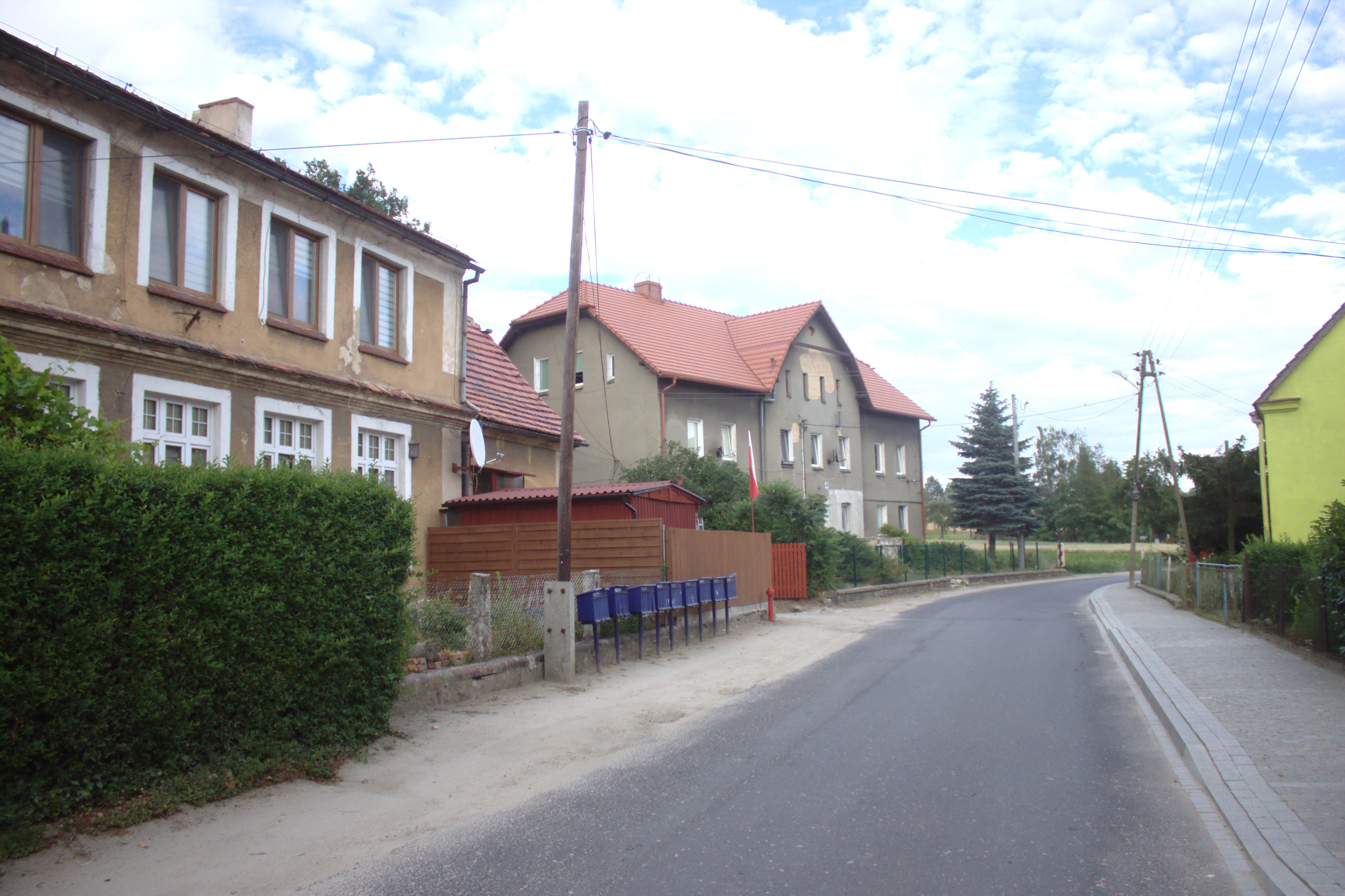
Houses by the road
