= Dzierzków =

- Village
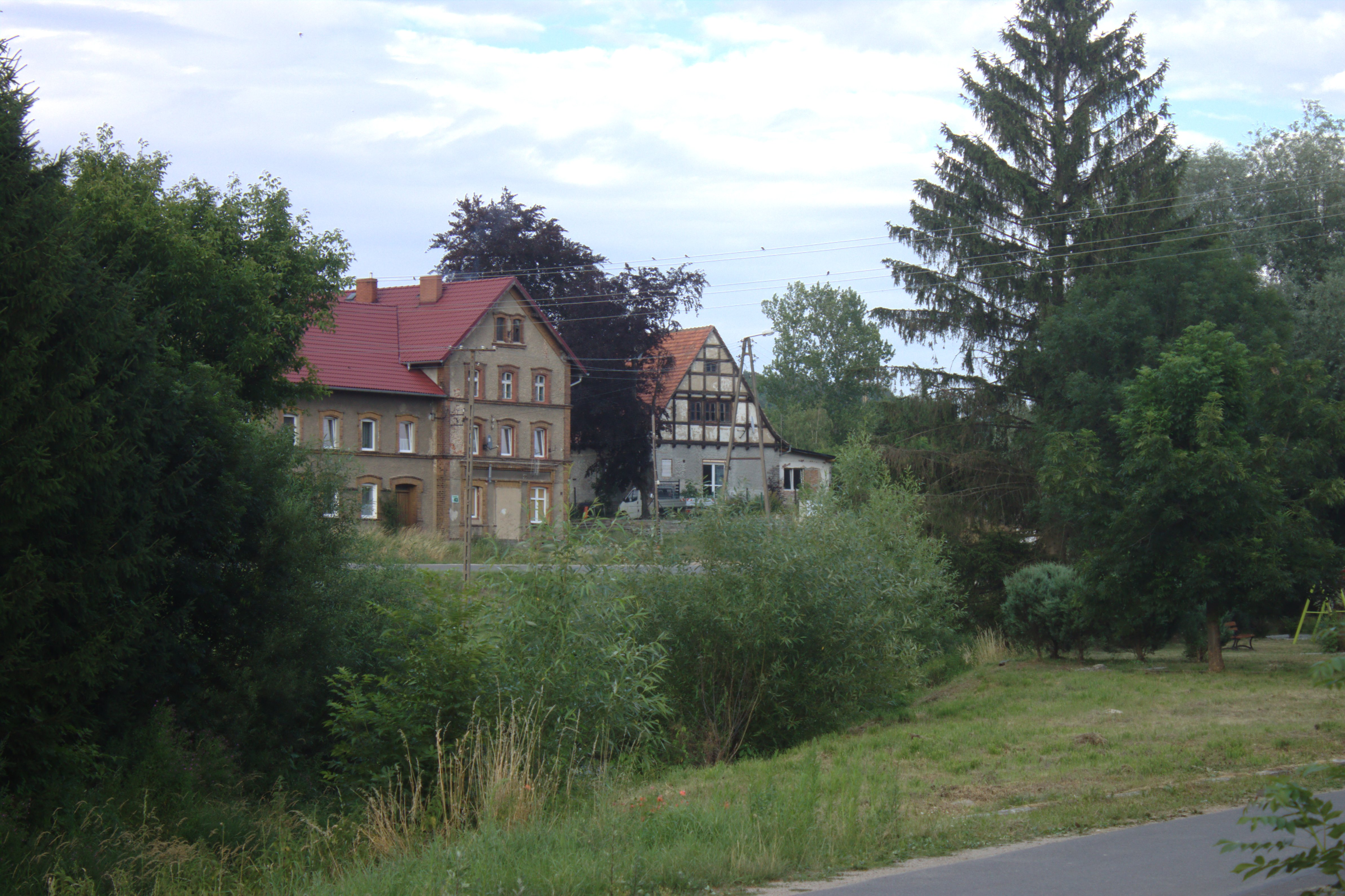
- Houses

- Location within Poland
- Coordinates: 50°59′08″N 16°13′51″E
- Country: Poland
- Voivodeship: Lower Silesian
- County: Świdnica
- Gmina: Dobromierz

Dzierzków [ˈd͡ʑɛʂkuf] is a village in the administrative district of Gmina Dobromierz, within Świdnica County, Lower Silesian Voivodeship, in south-western Poland.

== Gallery ==
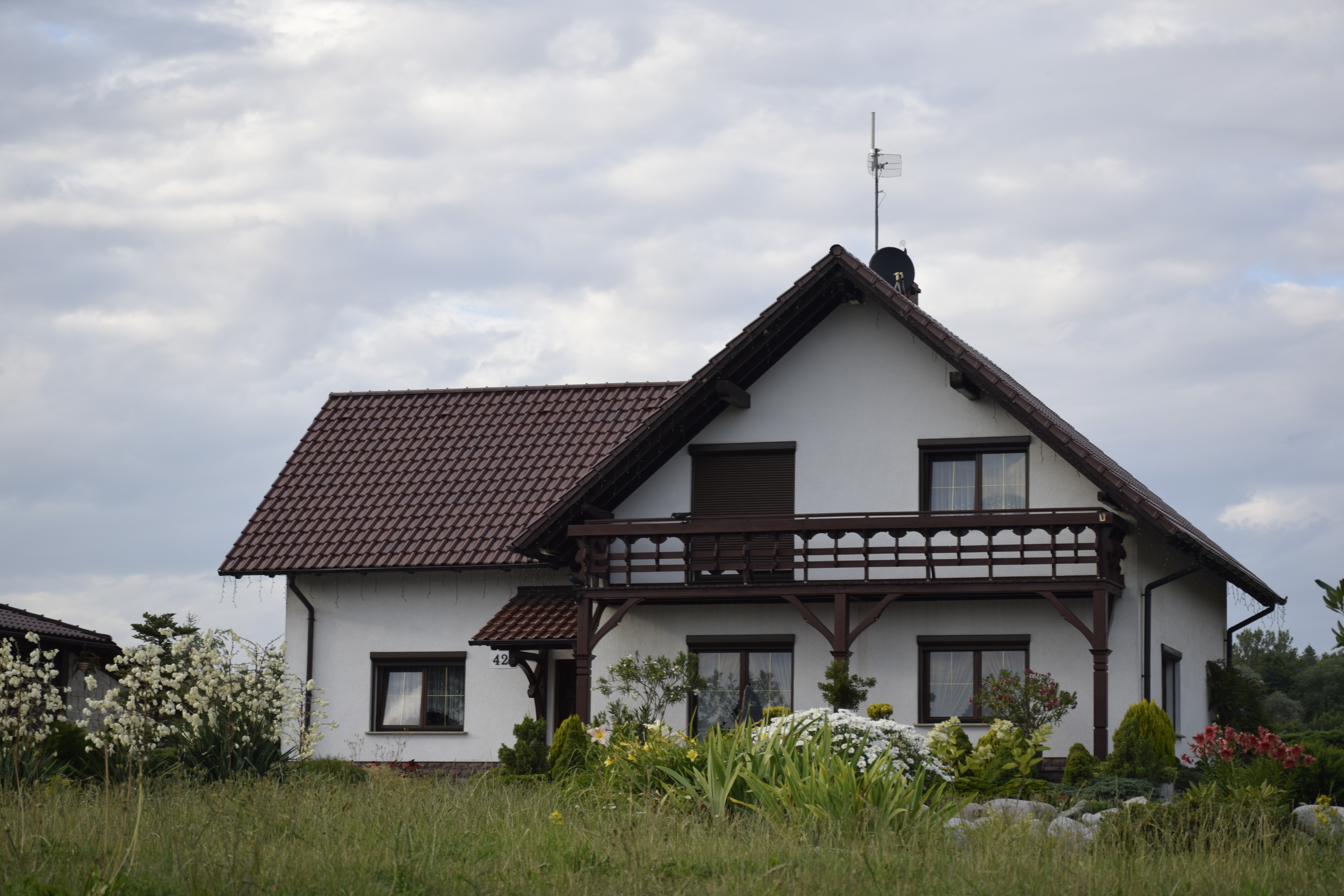
Family house

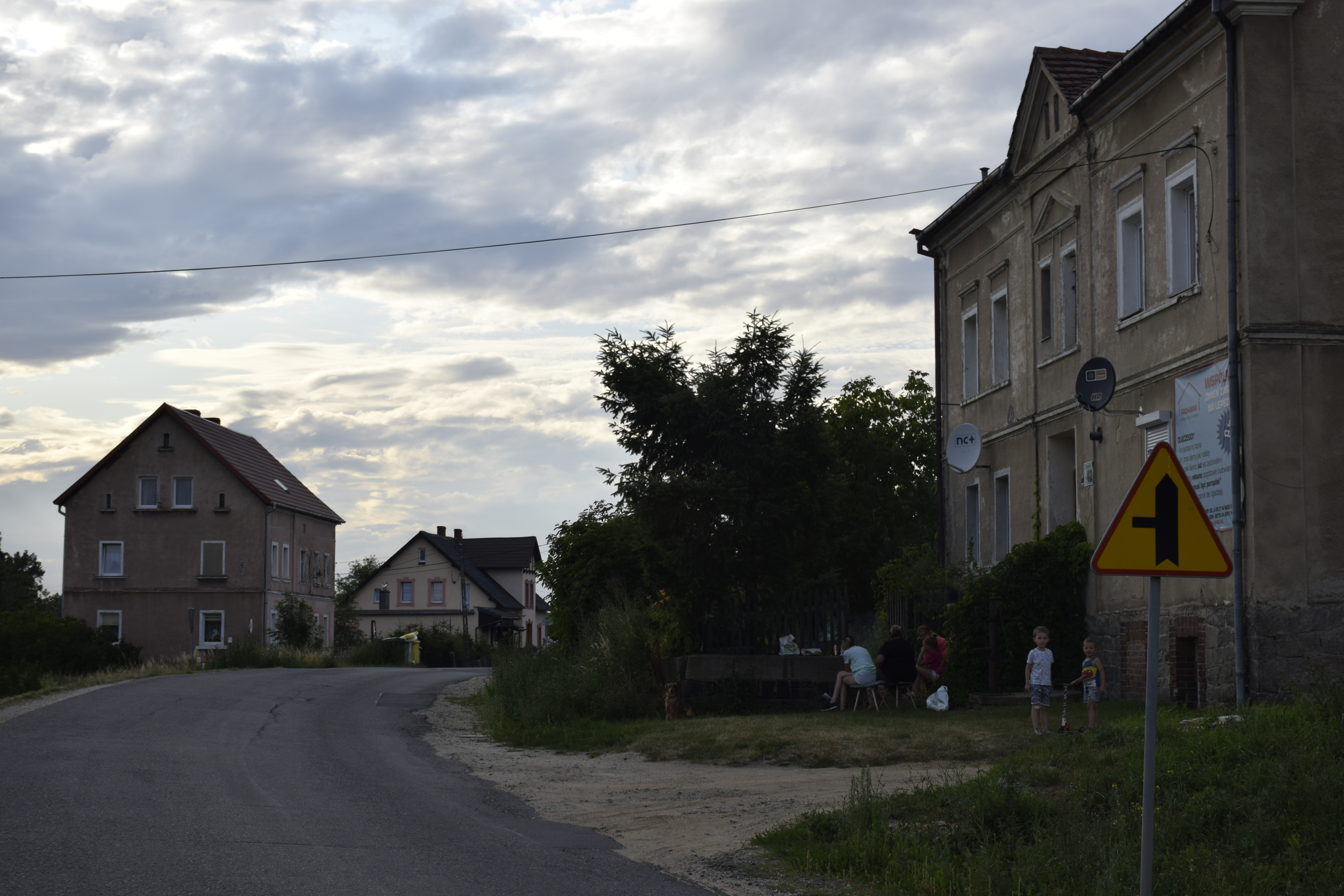
Street with children

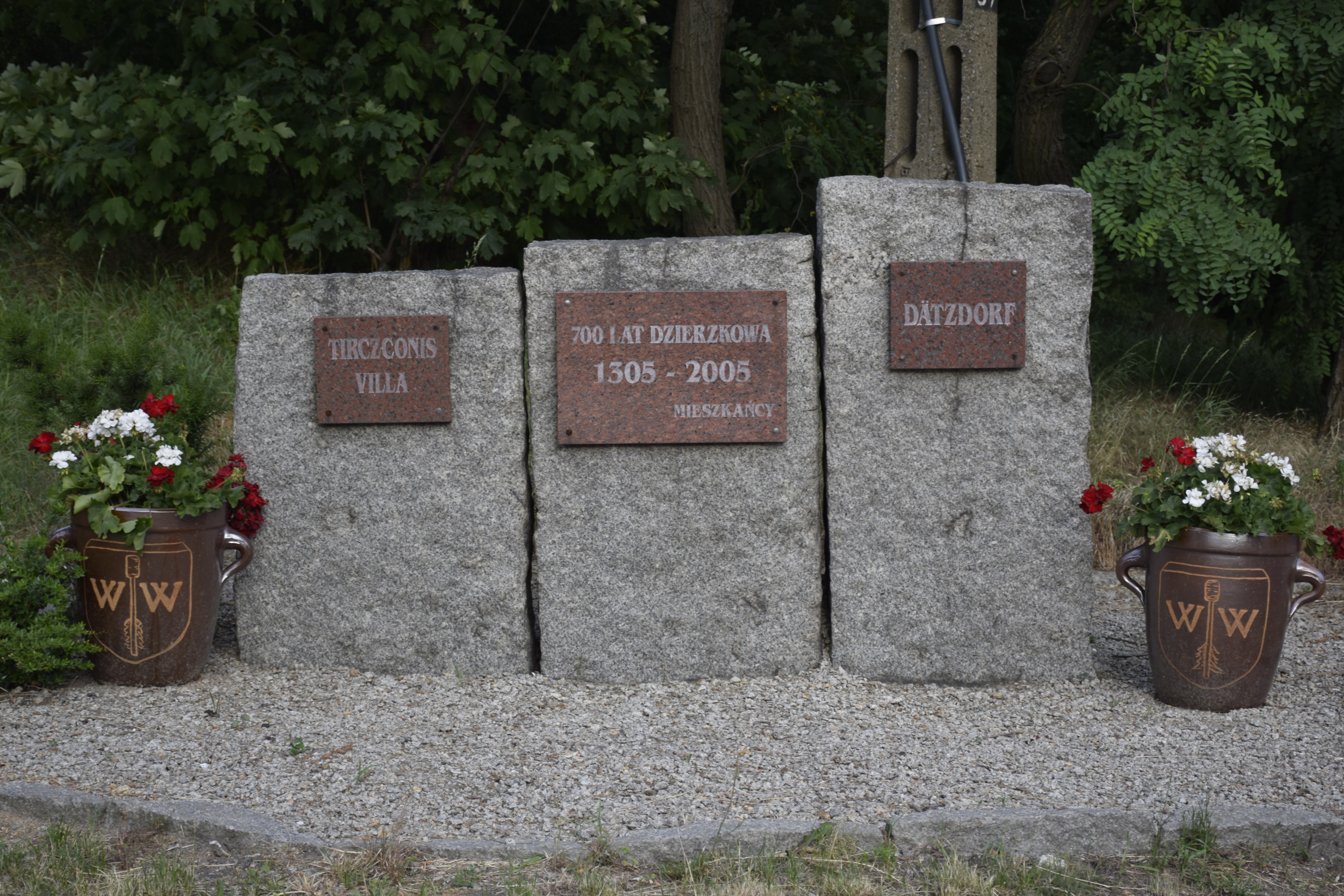
Memorial

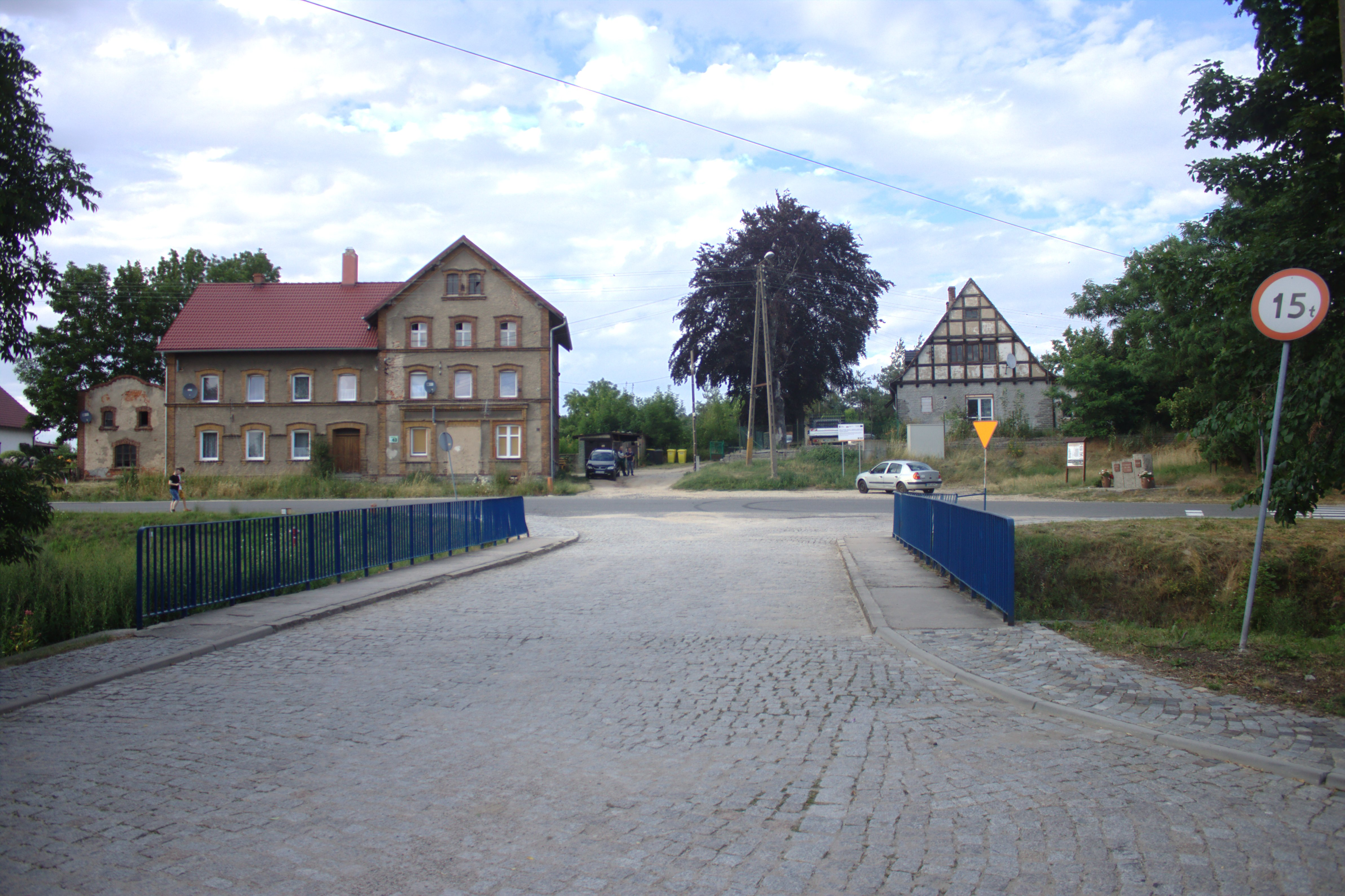
Bridge
