= Gmina Dobromierz =

Administrative district in Poland

Gmina Dobromierz Dobromierz Commune
- Gmina
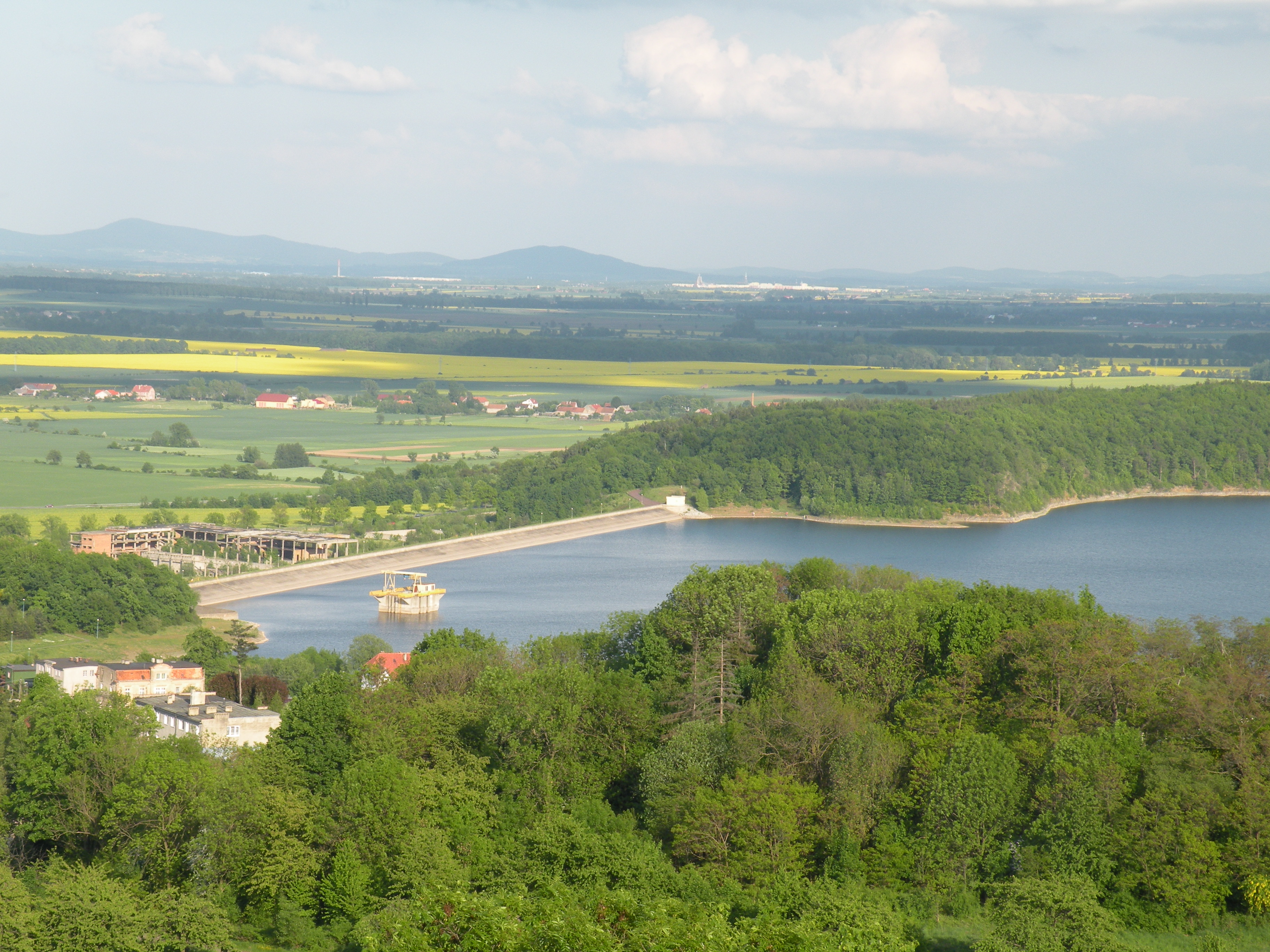
- View on Dobromierz and the bay, 2009

- Coat of arms
- Interactive map of Gmina Dobromierz
- Coordinates (Dobromierz): 50°54′40″N 16°14′19″E
- Country: Poland
- Voivodeship: Lower Silesian
- County: Świdnica
- Seat: Dobromierz
- Sołectwos: Borów, Bronów, Czernica, Dobromierz, Dzierzków, Gniewków, Jaskulin, Jugowa, Kłaczyna, Pietrzyków, Roztoka, Szymanów

Area
  - Total: 86.46 km^{2} (33.38 sq mi)

Population (2019-06-30)
  - Total: 5,198
  - Density: 60.12/km^{2} (155.7/sq mi)
- Website: https://www.dobromierz.pl

Gmina Dobromierz is a rural gmina (administrative district) in Świdnica County, Lower Silesian Voivodeship, in south-western Poland. Its seat is the village of Dobromierz (German: Hohenfriedeberg), which lies approximately 16 kilometres (10 mi) north-west of Świdnica, and 61 kilometres (38 mi) south-west of the regional capital Wrocław.

The gmina covers an area of 86.46 square kilometres (33.4 sq mi), and as of 2019 its total population is 5,198.

== Neighbouring gminas ==
Gmina Dobromierz is bordered by the town of Świebodzice and the gminas of Bolków, Mściwojów, Paszowice, Stare Bogaczowice and Strzegom.

== Villages ==
The gmina contains the villages of Borów, Bronów, Czernica, Dobromierz, Dzierzków, Gniewków, Jaskulin, Jugowa, Kłaczyna, Pietrzyków, Roztoka and Szymanów.
