= Jaskulin =

- Village
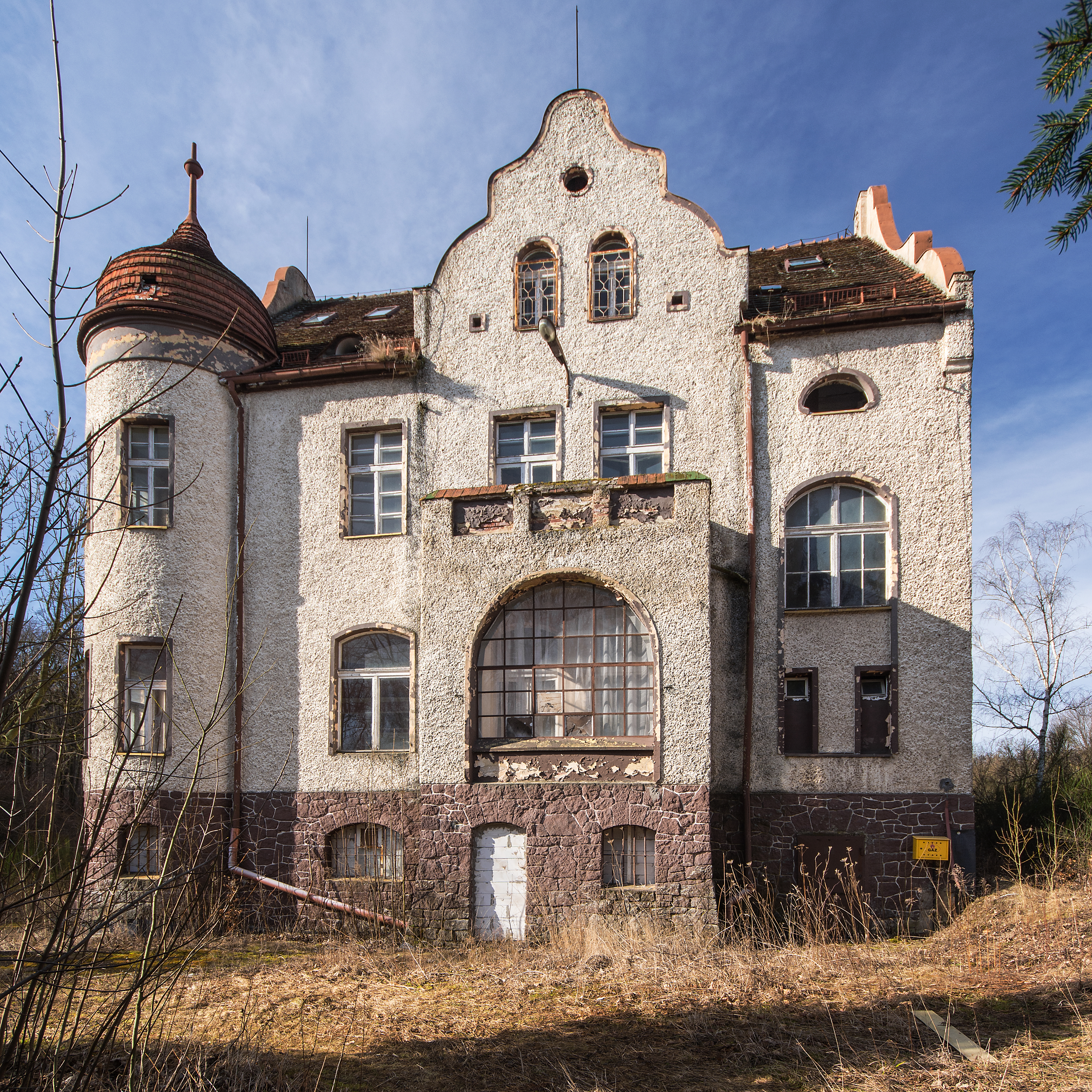
- Jaskulin Palace

- Location within Poland
- Coordinates: 50°53′03″N 16°15′28″E
- Country: Poland
- Voivodeship: Lower Silesian
- County: Świdnica
- Gmina: Dobromierz

Jaskulin [jasˈkulin] is a village in the administrative district of Gmina Dobromierz, within Świdnica County, Lower Silesian Voivodeship, in south-western Poland.

== Gallery ==
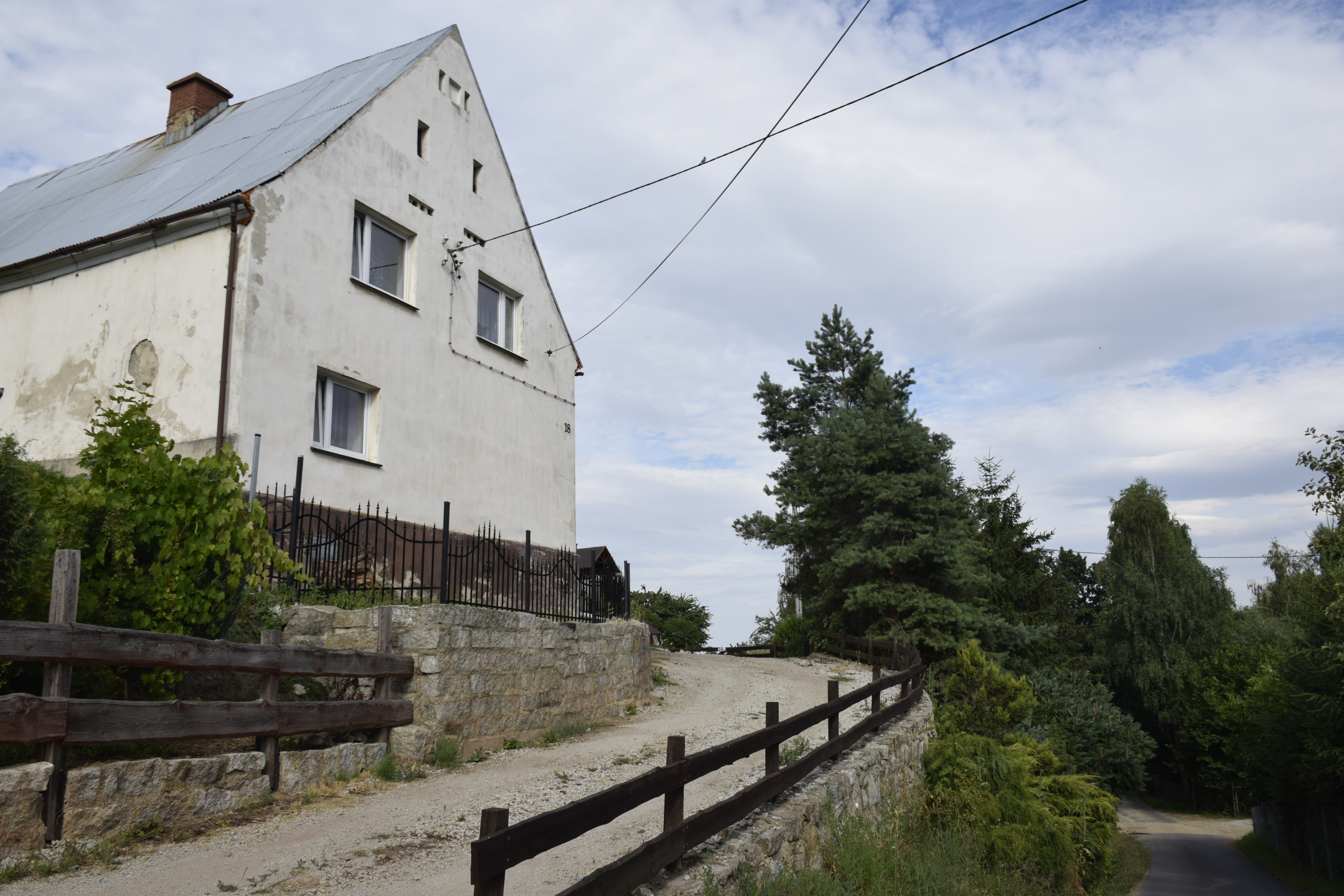
House

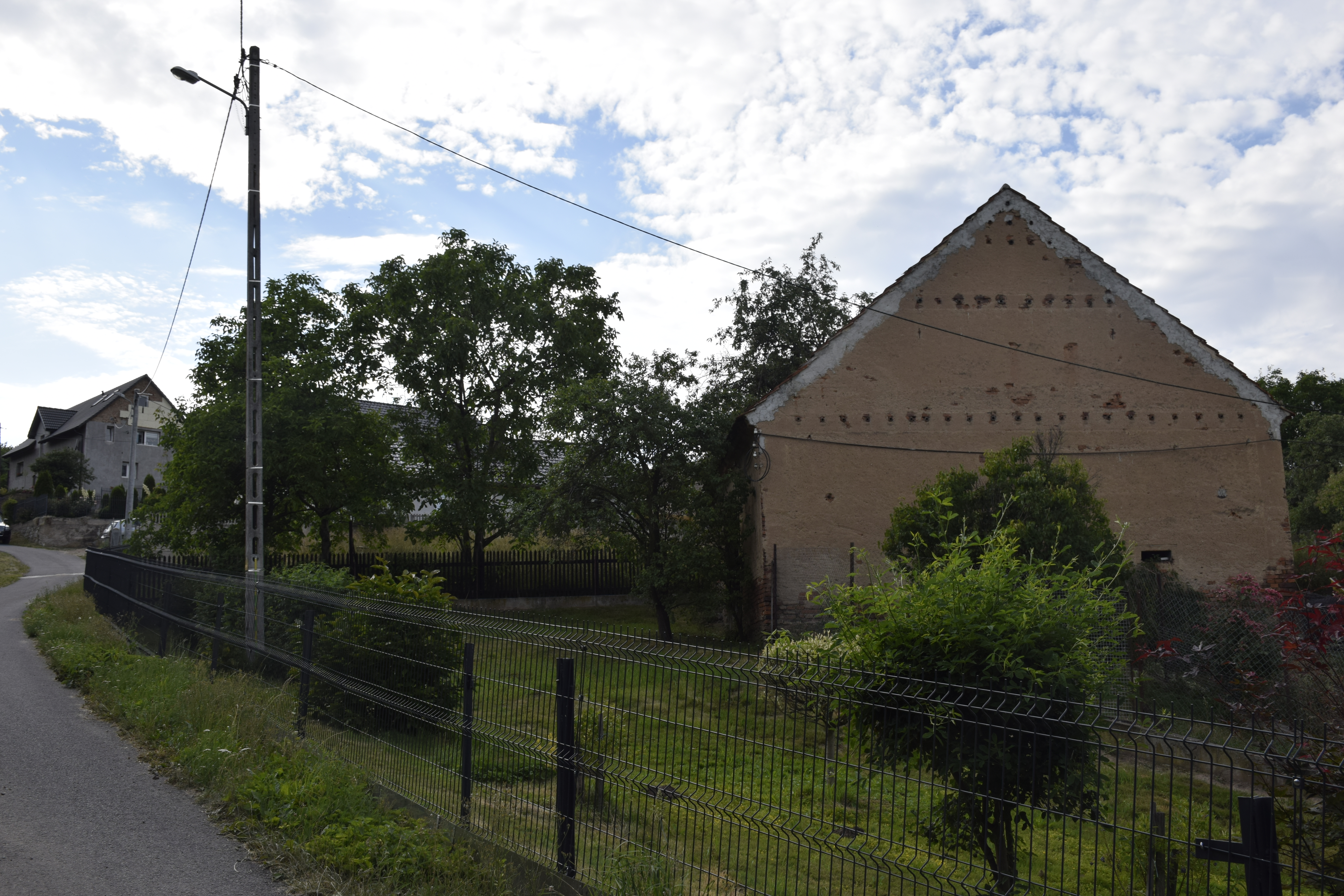
Barn in the garden

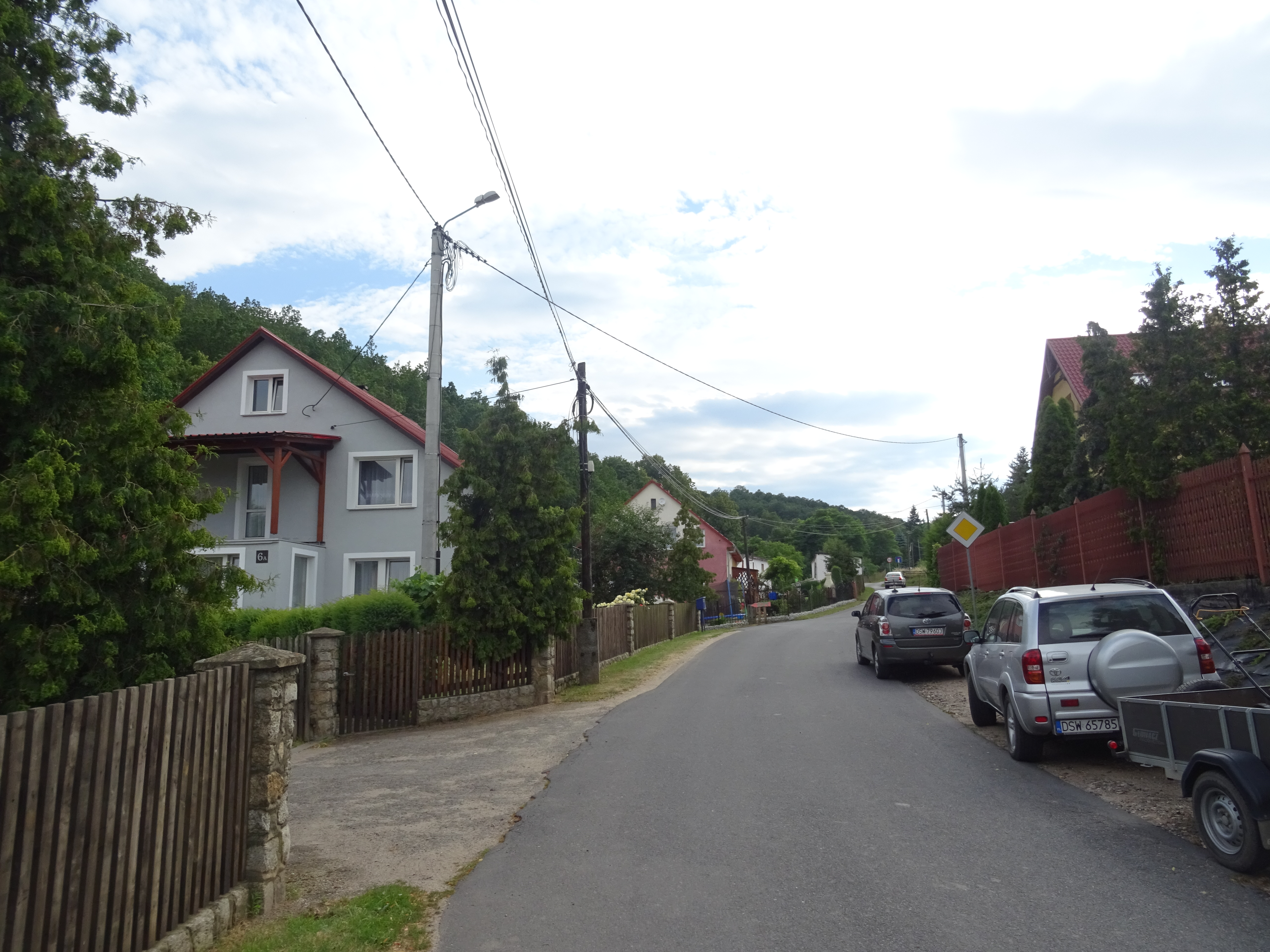
Road with houses
