= Bronów, Świdnica County =

Bronów
- Village
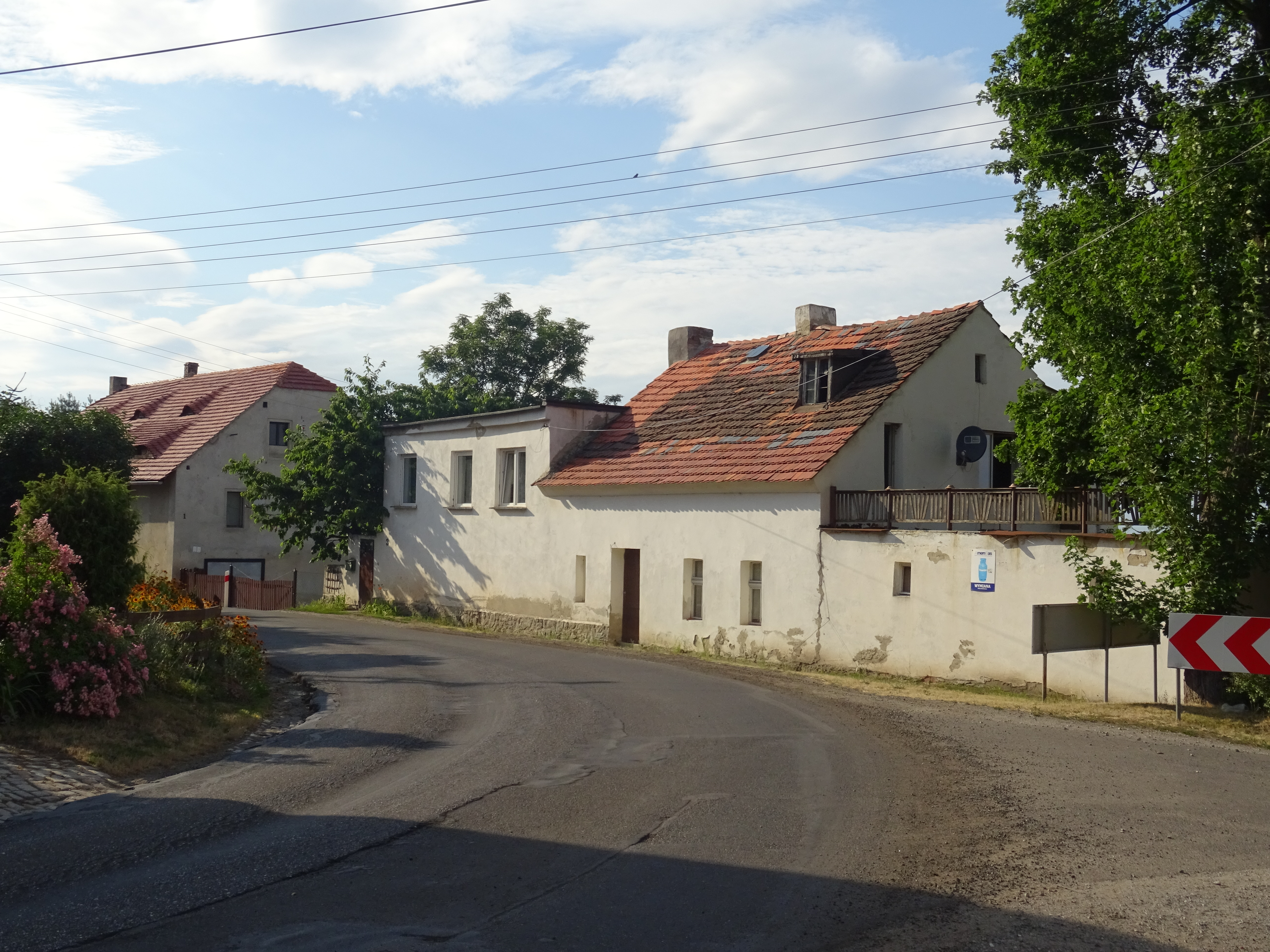
- Houses by the road

- Location within Poland
- Coordinates: 50°55′41″N 16°13′03″E
- Country: Poland
- Voivodeship: Lower Silesian
- County: Świdnica
- Gmina: Dobromierz
- Population (approx.): 100

Bronów [ˈbrɔnuf] is a village in the administrative district of Gmina Dobromierz, within Świdnica County, Lower Silesian Voivodeship, in south-western Poland.

== Gallery ==
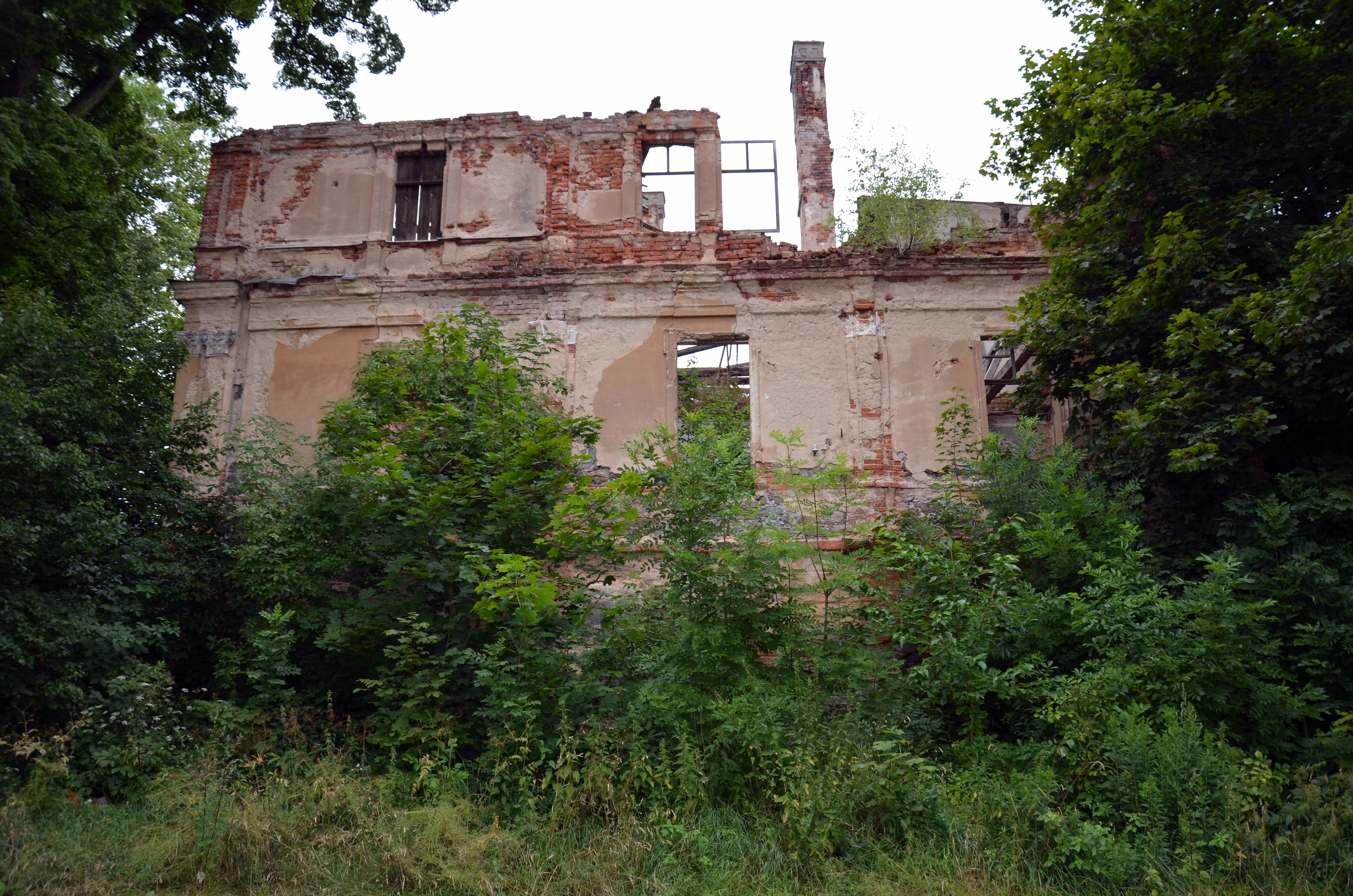
Ruined palace

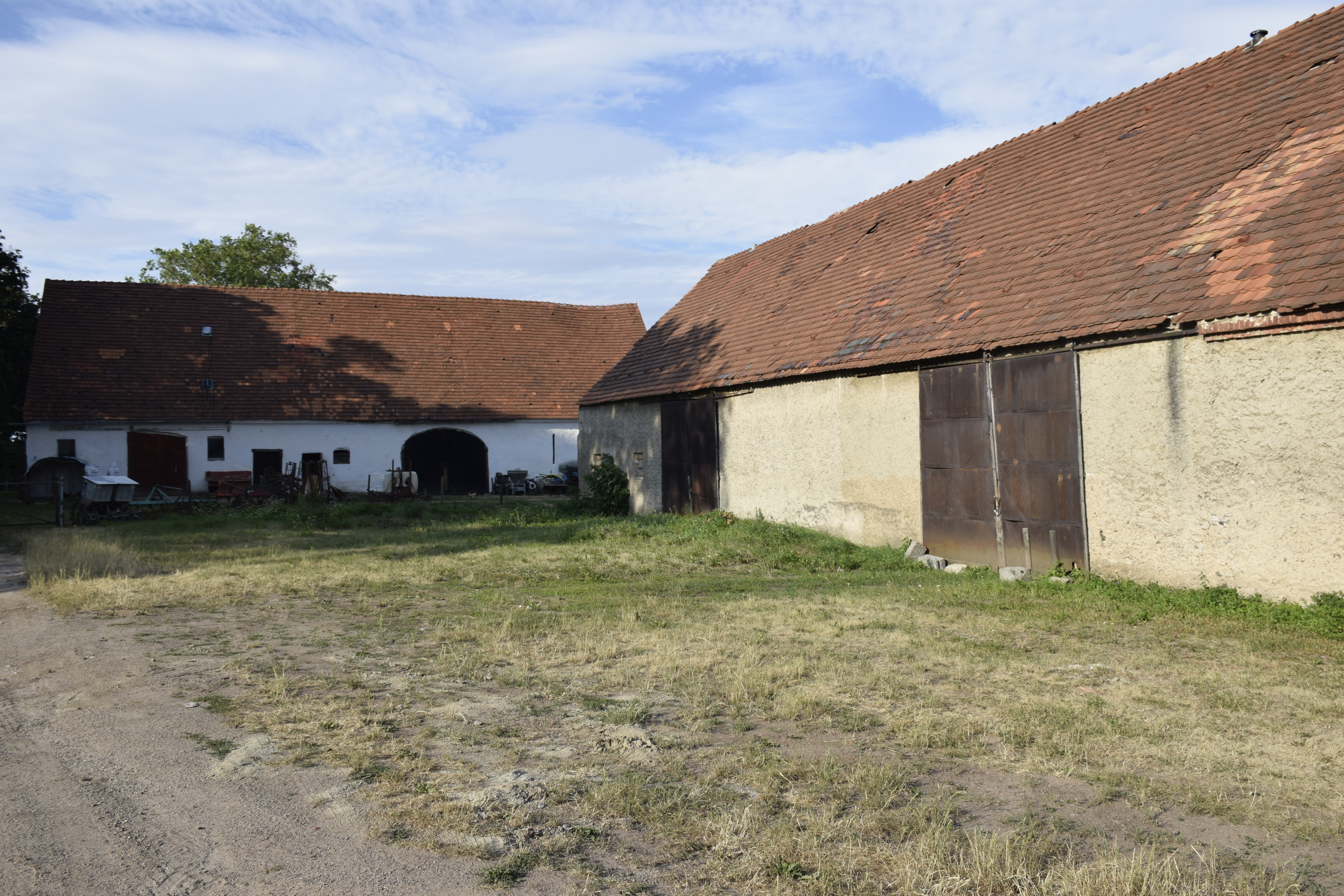
Barn

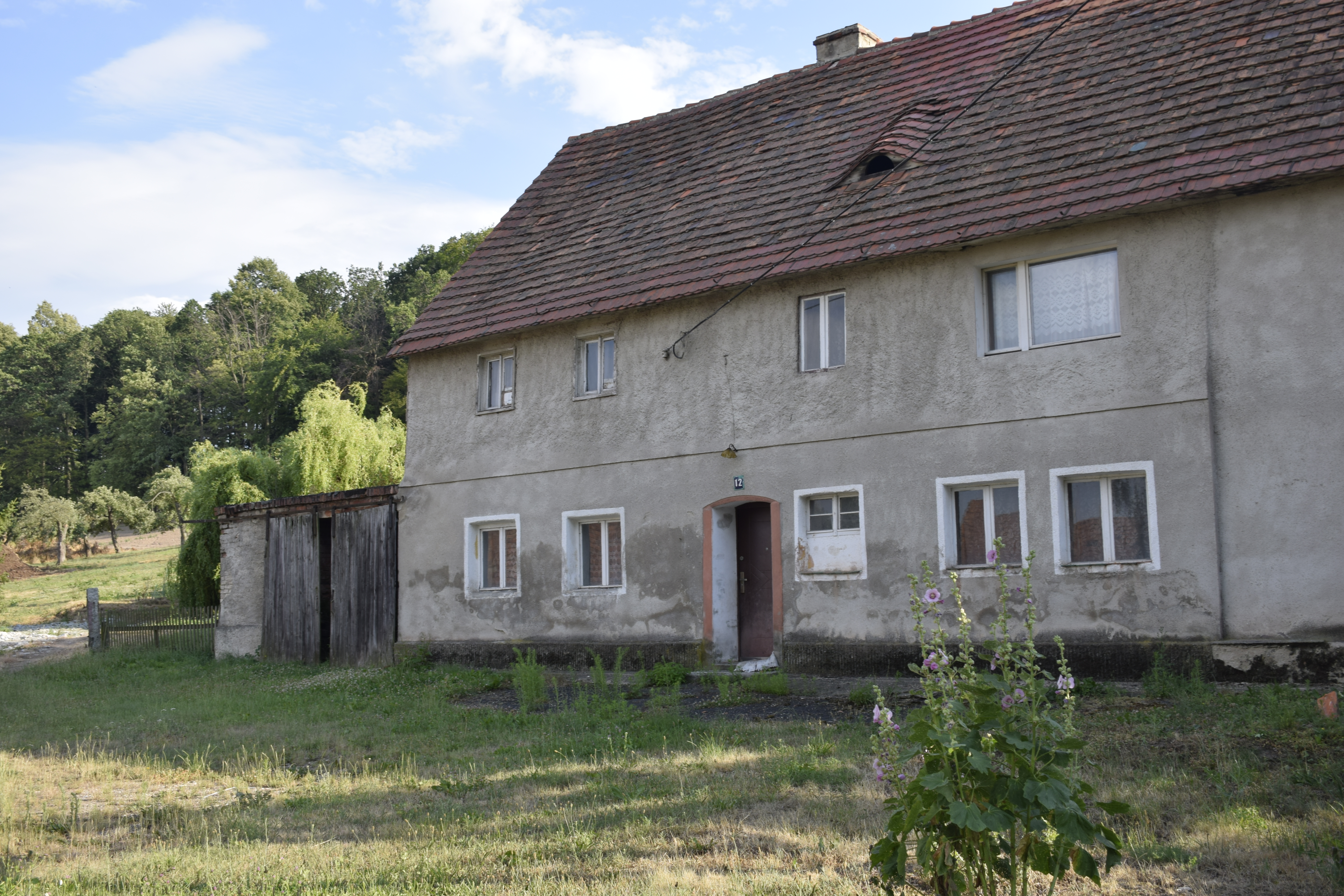
House

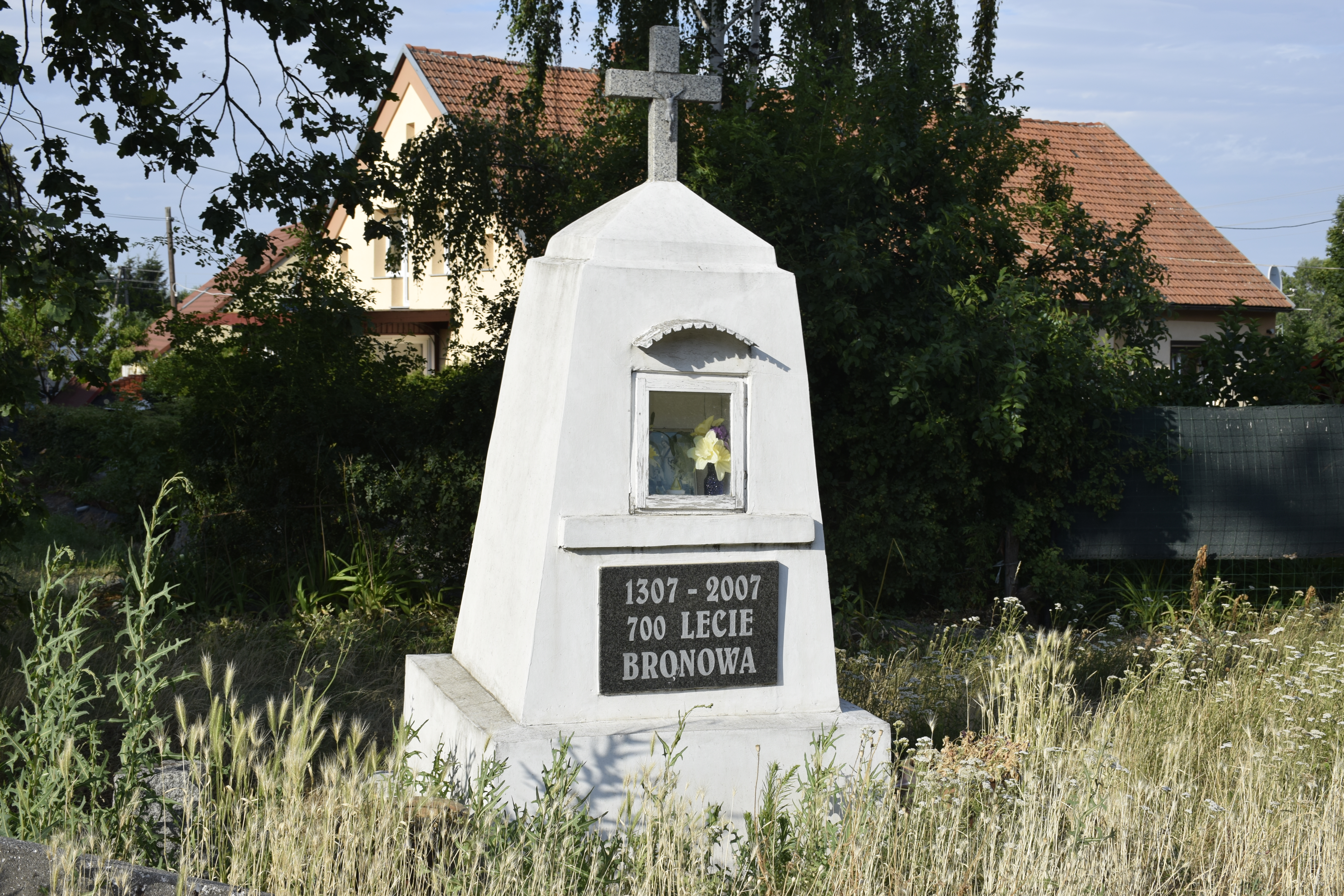
Wayside shrine
