= Dobromierz, Lower Silesian Voivodeship =

Dobromierz
- Village
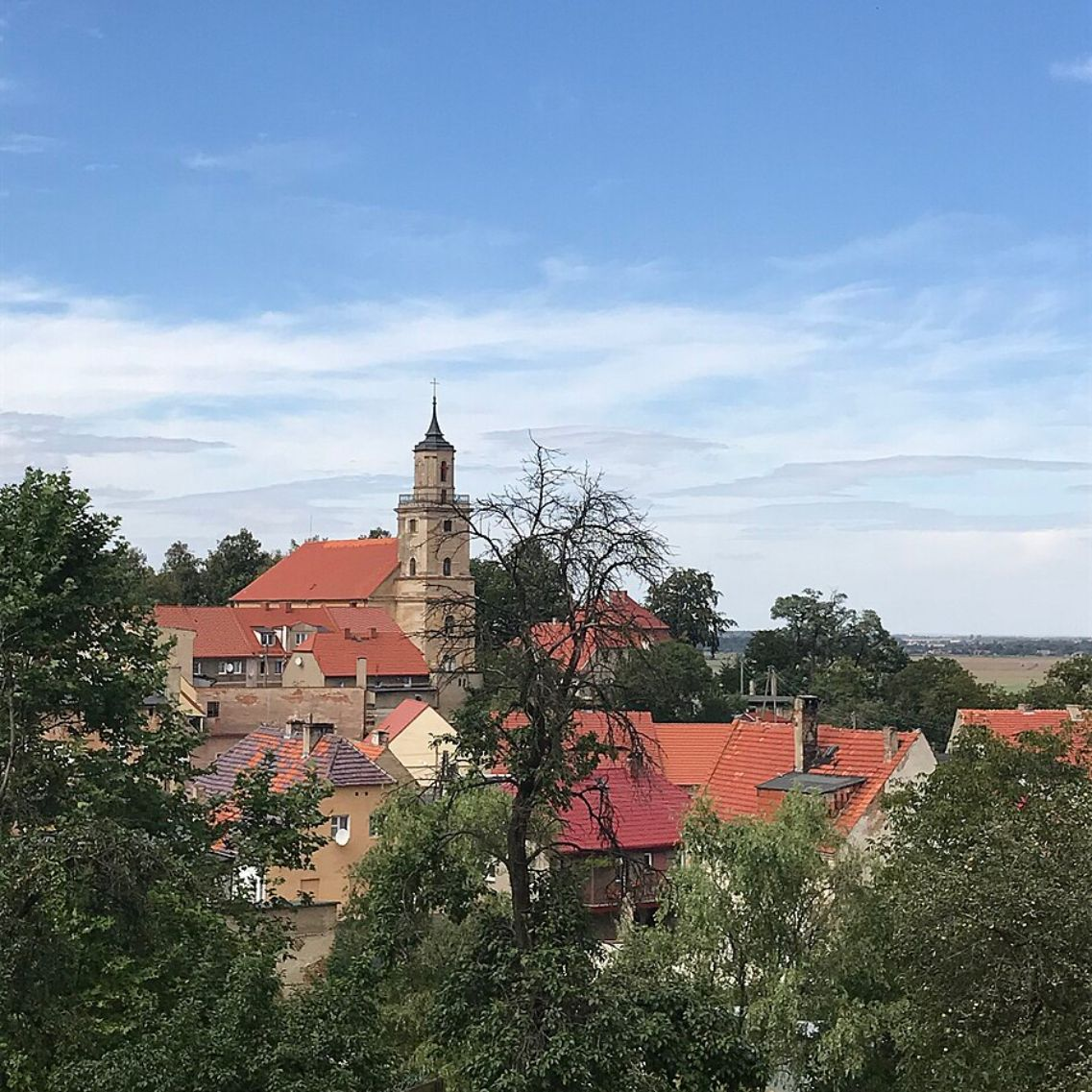
- Dobromierz

- Coat of arms

- Location within Poland
- Coordinates: 50°54′40″N 16°14′19″E
- Country: Poland
- Voivodeship: Lower Silesian
- County: Świdnica
- Gmina: Dobromierz
- Population: 800
- Time zone: UTC+1 (CET)
  - Summer (DST): UTC+2 (CEST)
- Vehicle registration: DSW
- Website: http://www.dobromierz.pl/

Dobromierz [dɔˈbrɔmjɛʂ] is a village in Świdnica County, Lower Silesian Voivodeship, in south-western Poland. The municipality lies approximately 16 km (10 mi) north-west of Świdnica, and 61 km (38 mi) south-west of the regional capital Wrocław.

It is the main municipality and the seat of the administrative district (gmina) called Gmina Dobromierz.

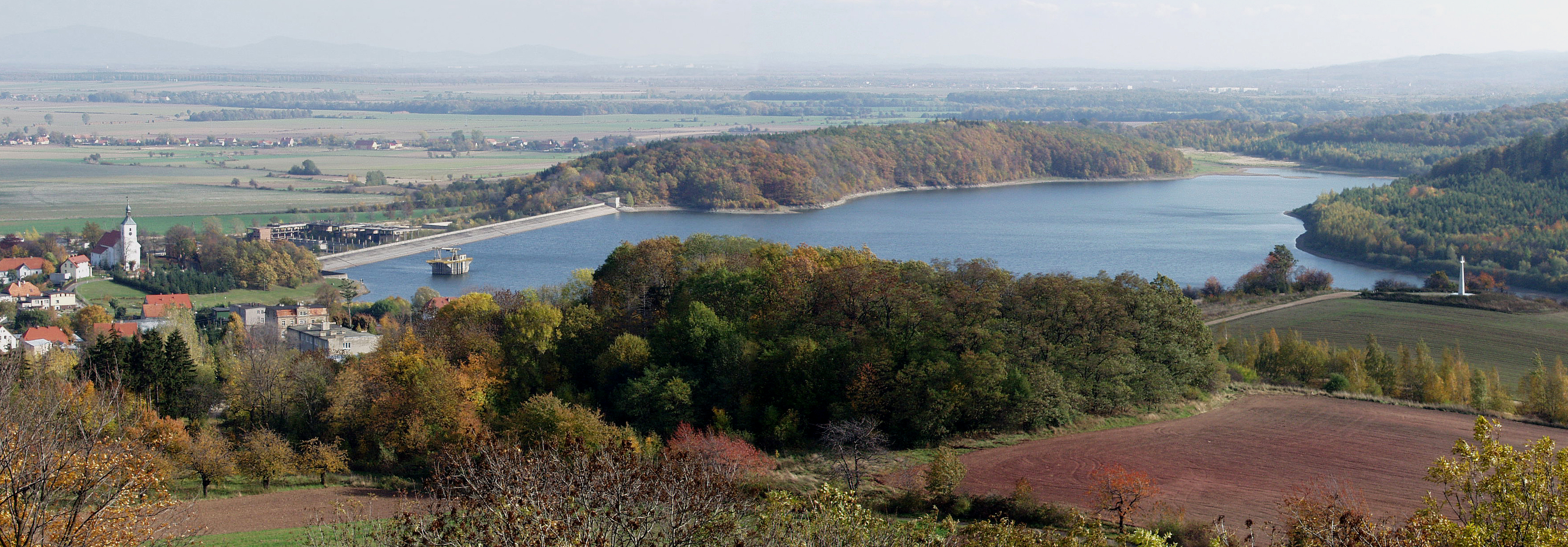
Dam in Dobromierz

First mentioned as Vrideberch in a 1307 deed, it received town privileges about 1409. The area was the site of Frederick the Great's victory at the Battle of Hohenfriedberg (Hohenfriedeberg), fought between Austria and Prussia on 4 June 1745, during the War of the Austrian Succession.

It is the birthplace of Polish cyclist and Olympic medallist Stanisław Szozda.
