= Pietrzyków, Lower Silesian Voivodeship =

Pietrzyków
- Village
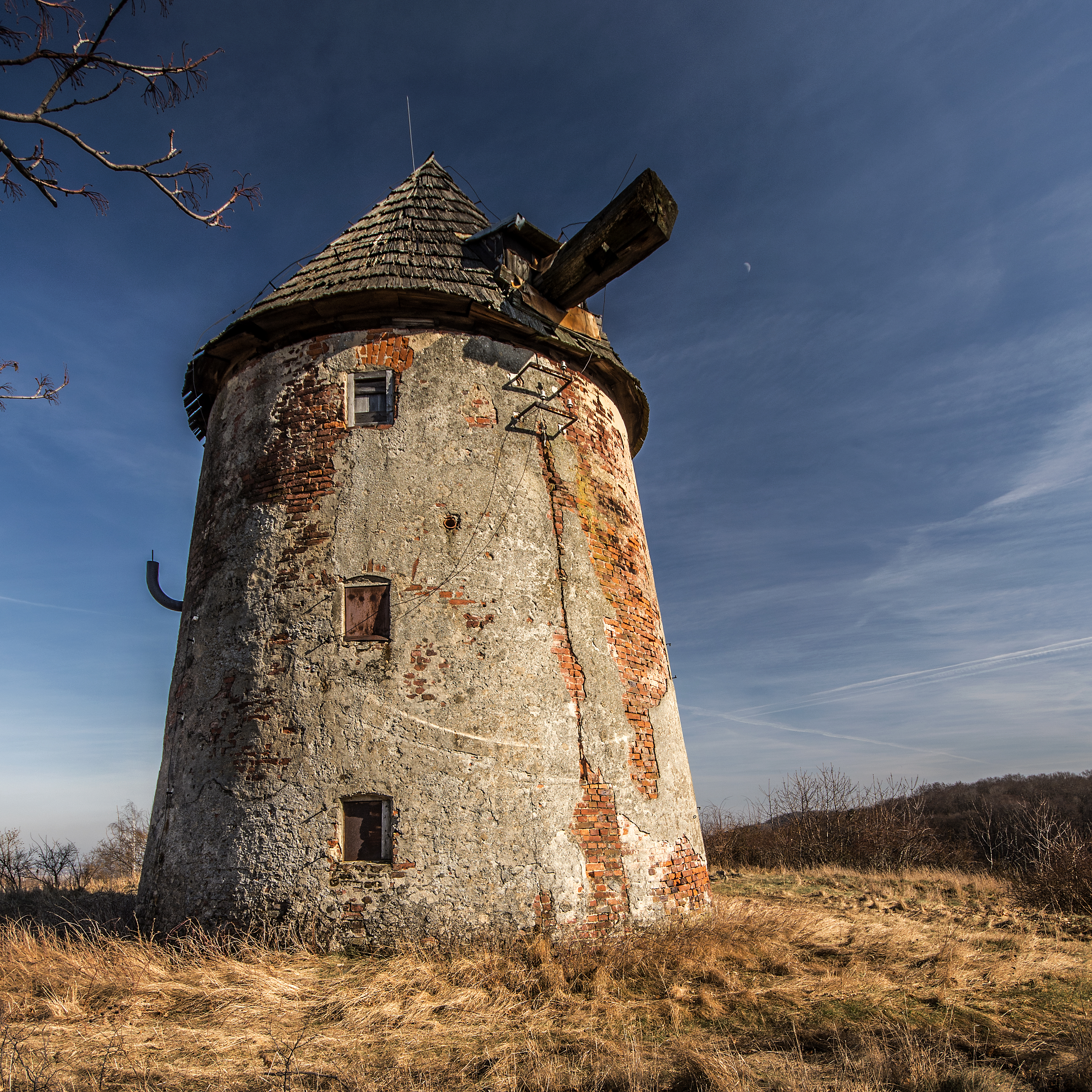
- Dutch mill in Pietrzyków

- Location within Poland
- Coordinates: 50°53′54″N 16°12′48″E
- Country: Poland
- Voivodeship: Lower Silesian
- County: Świdnica
- Gmina: Dobromierz

Pietrzyków [pjɛˈtʂɨkuf] is a village in the administrative district of Gmina Dobromierz, within Świdnica County, Lower Silesian Voivodeship, in south-western Poland.
