= Roztoka, Lower Silesian Voivodeship =

Roztoka
- Village
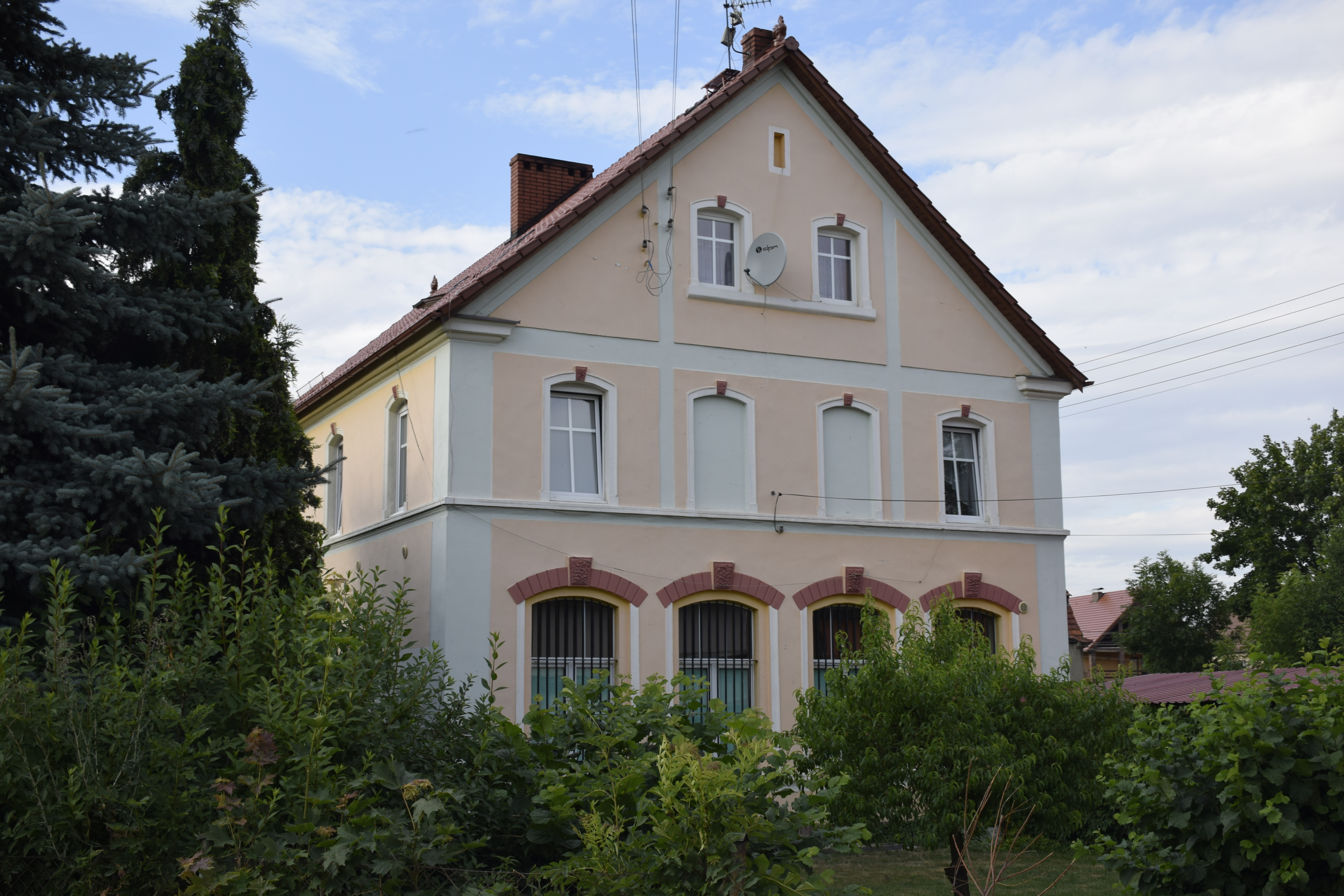
- House

- Location within Poland
- Coordinates: 50°57′59″N 16°13′54″E
- Country: Poland
- Voivodeship: Lower Silesian
- County: Świdnica
- Gmina: Dobromierz
- Population: 1,098

Roztoka [rɔsˈtɔka] is a village in the administrative district of Gmina Dobromierz, within Świdnica County, Lower Silesian Voivodeship, in south-western Poland.

The German name of the village, Rohnstock, originates from Old High German "rono", Middle High German "rone" = tree trunk and “stoc" = stock of trees and came about because the trees were felled at this point and the (root) stocks were cleaned. An earlier city seal shows a wooden stick with two axes (rode).

In 1305 the name of the place was first mentioned in the "Liber Foundationis..." as Rostock.

The place is best known for the Rohnstock Castle of the same name, where Frederick the Great stayed in 1745 during the Battle of Hohenfriedberg. The castle was owned by the Counts of Hochberg til 1945. Until 1945, Rohnstock, which had around 1,600 inhabitants at the time, belonged to the district of Jauer in the German province of Lower Silesia. The last German inhabitants were expelled in July 1946 after the ethnic cleansing of the region by Polish authorities after the annexation of Silesia.

== Gallery ==
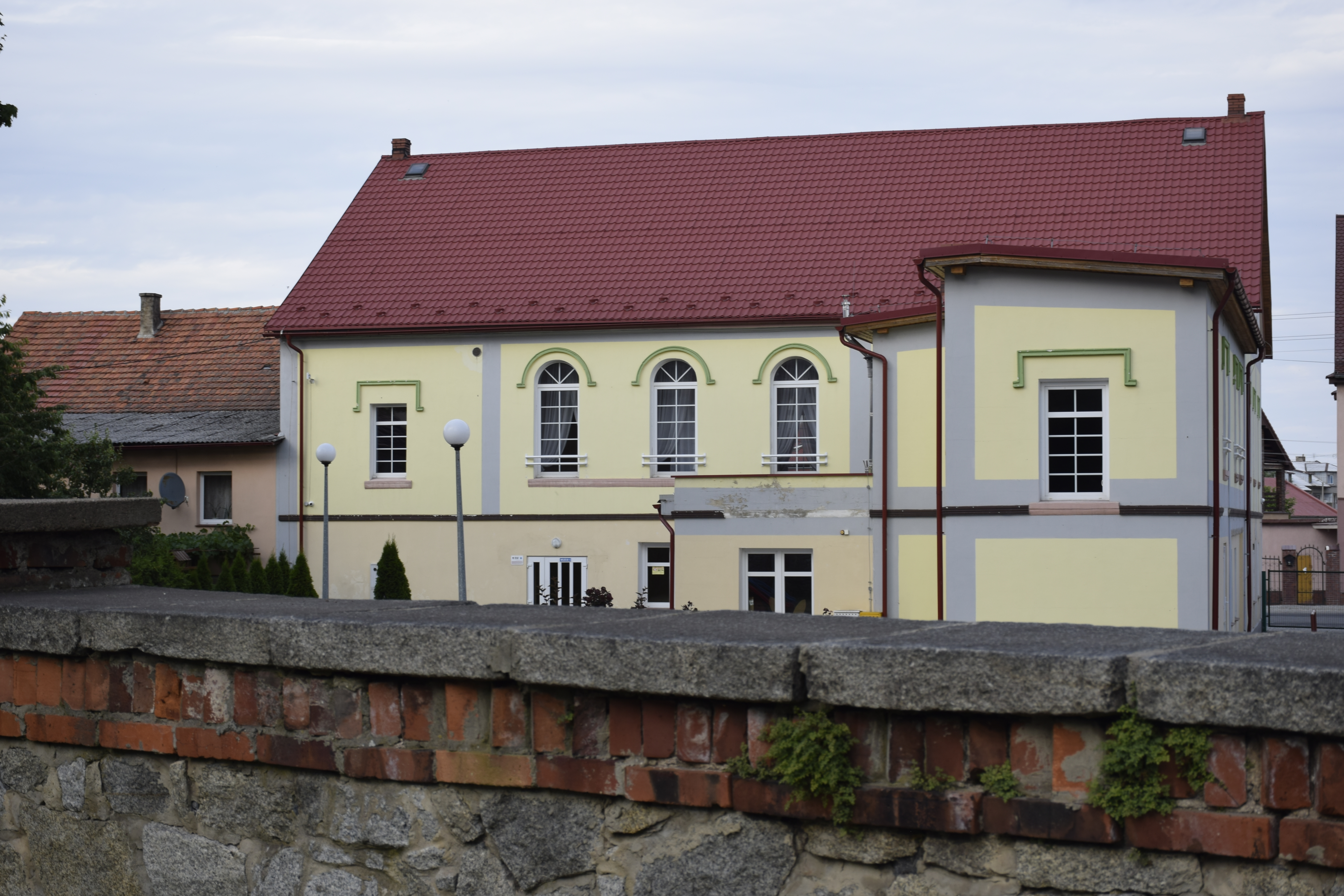
House

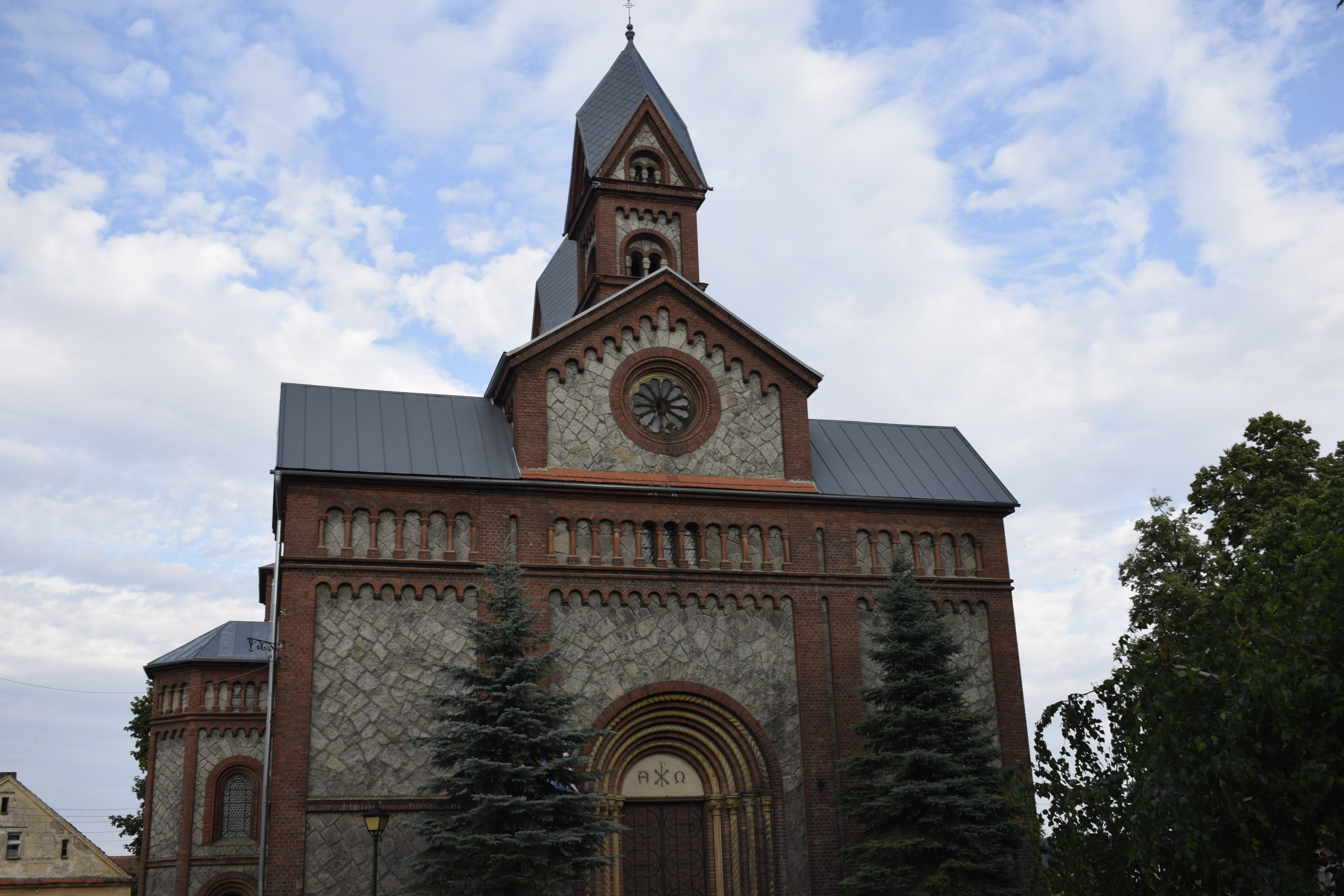
Church

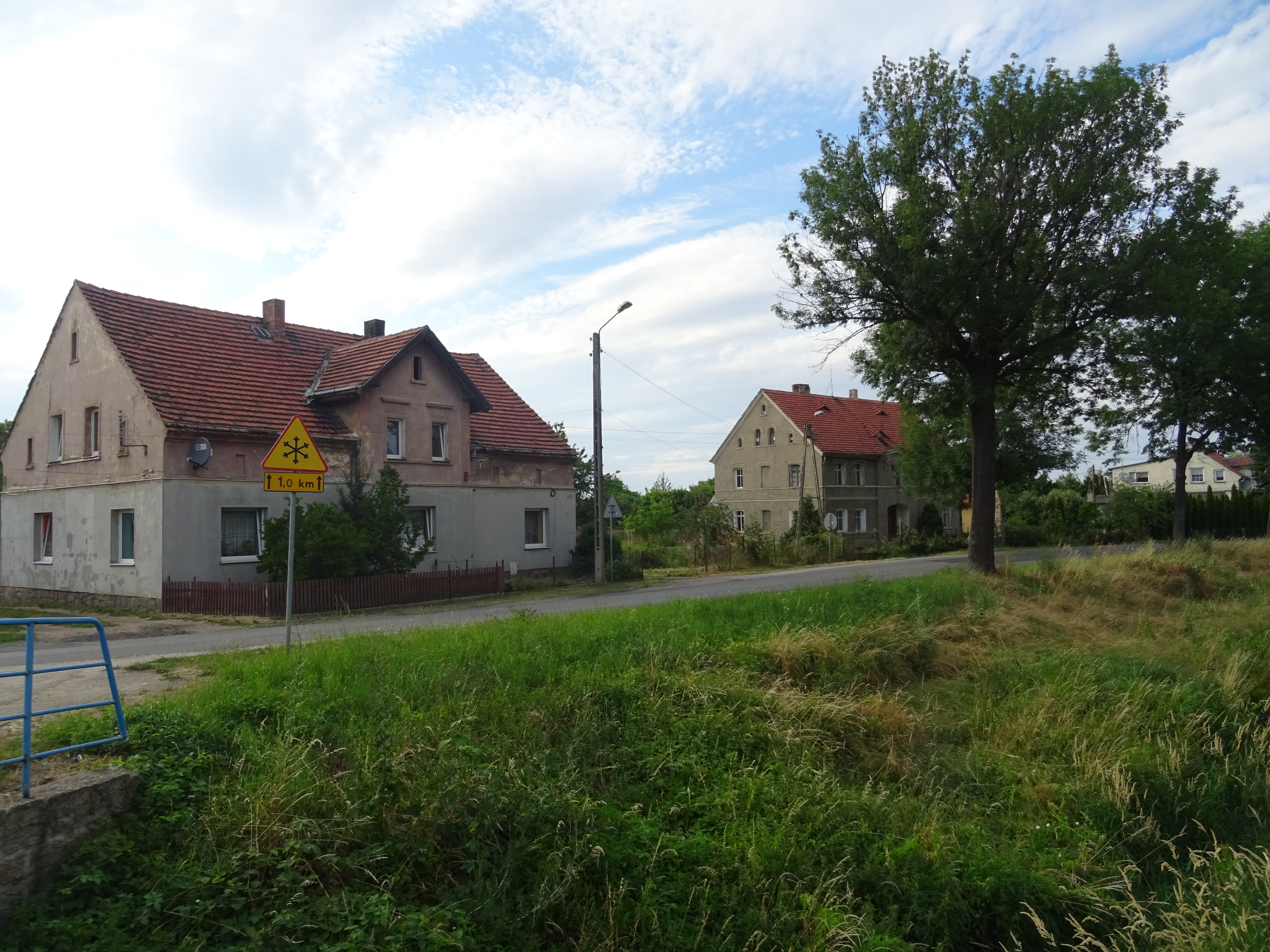
Houses by road

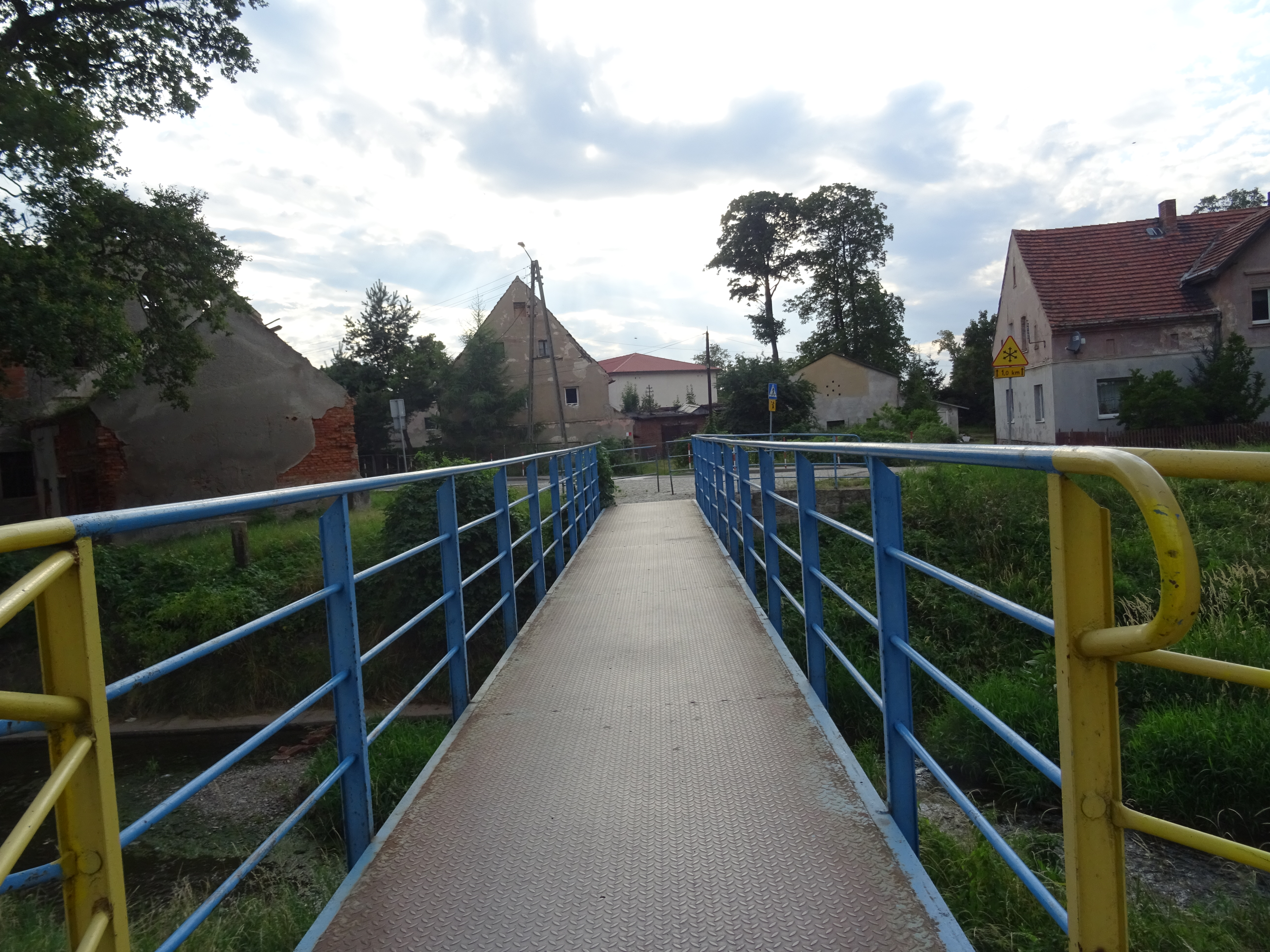
Footbridge
