= Szymanów, Świdnica County =

Szymanów
- Village
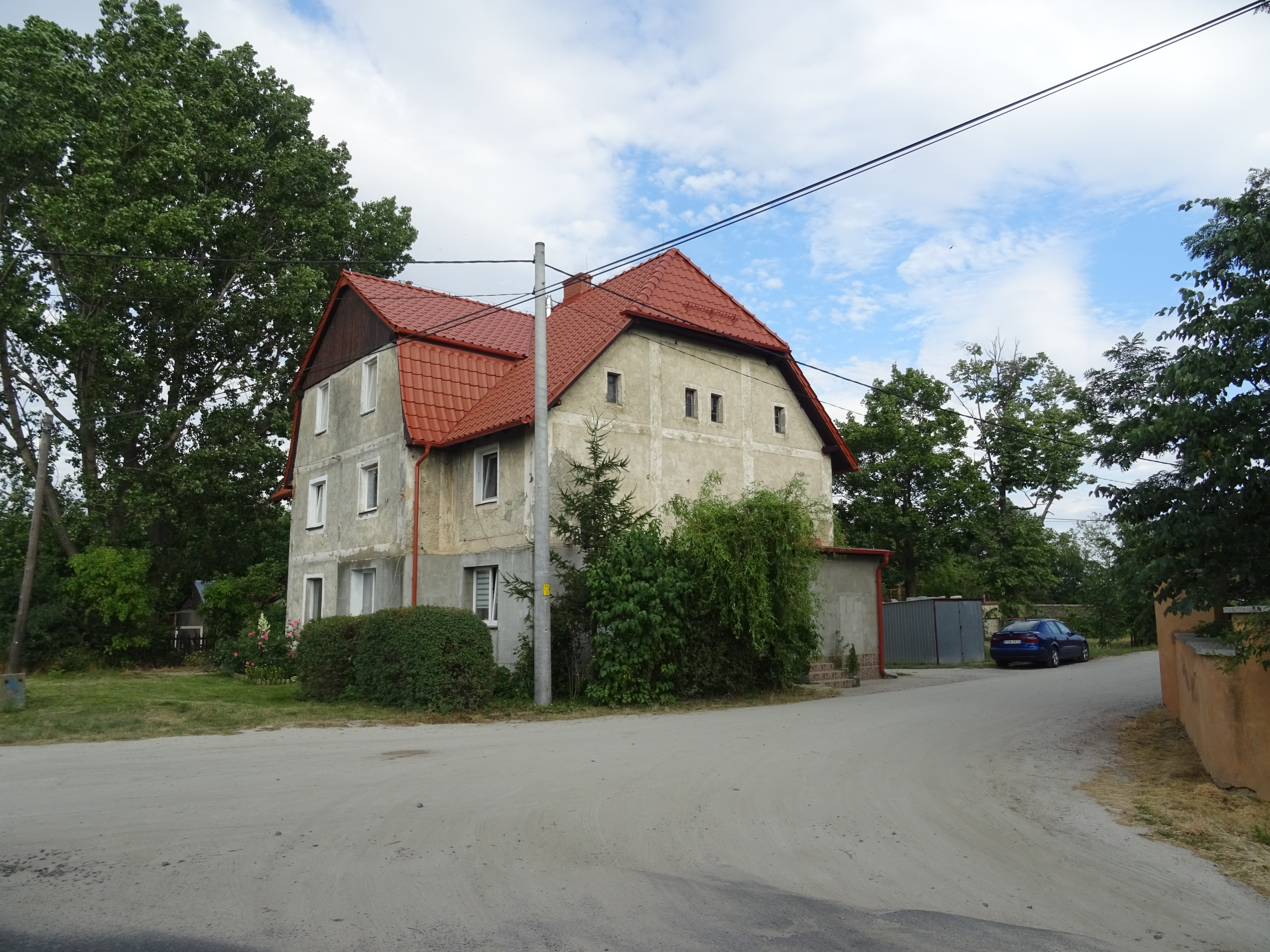
- House

- Location within Poland
- Coordinates: 50°54′28″N 16°16′41″E
- Country: Poland
- Voivodeship: Lower Silesian
- County: Świdnica
- Gmina: Dobromierz

Szymanów (Polish: [ʂɨˈmanuf]) is a village in the administrative district of Gmina Dobromierz, within Świdnica County, Lower Silesian Voivodeship, in south-western Poland.

== Gallery ==
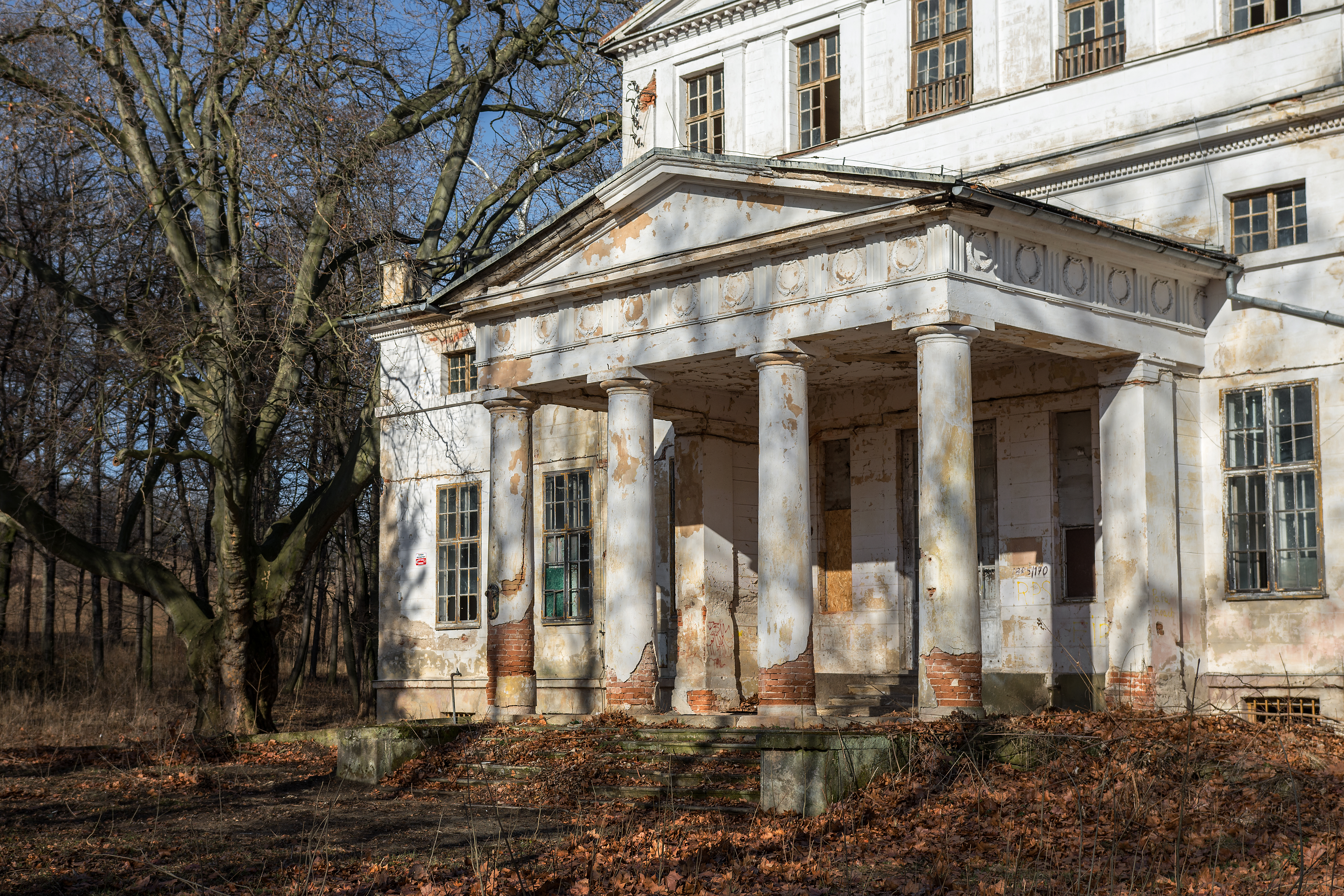
Palace

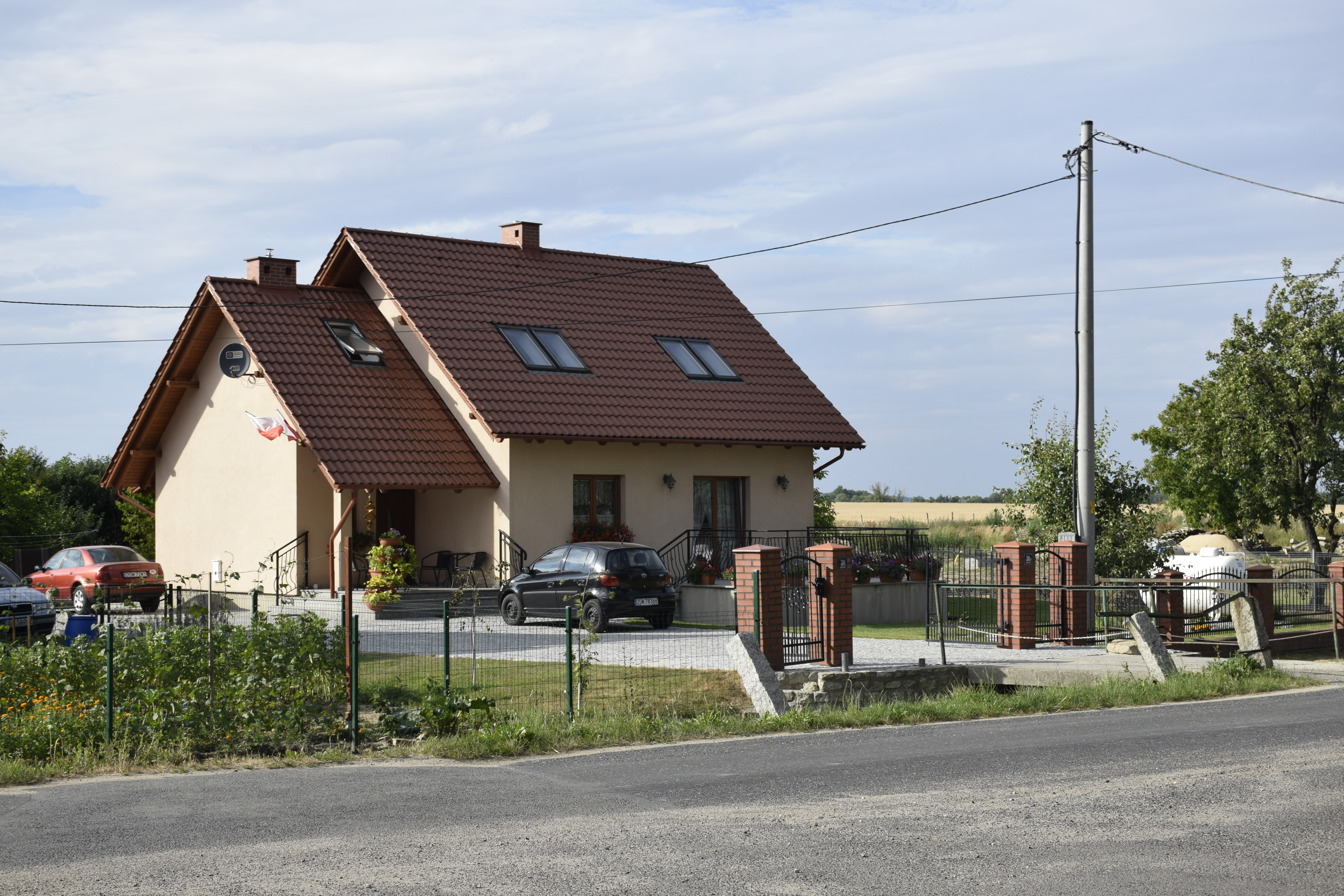
Family house

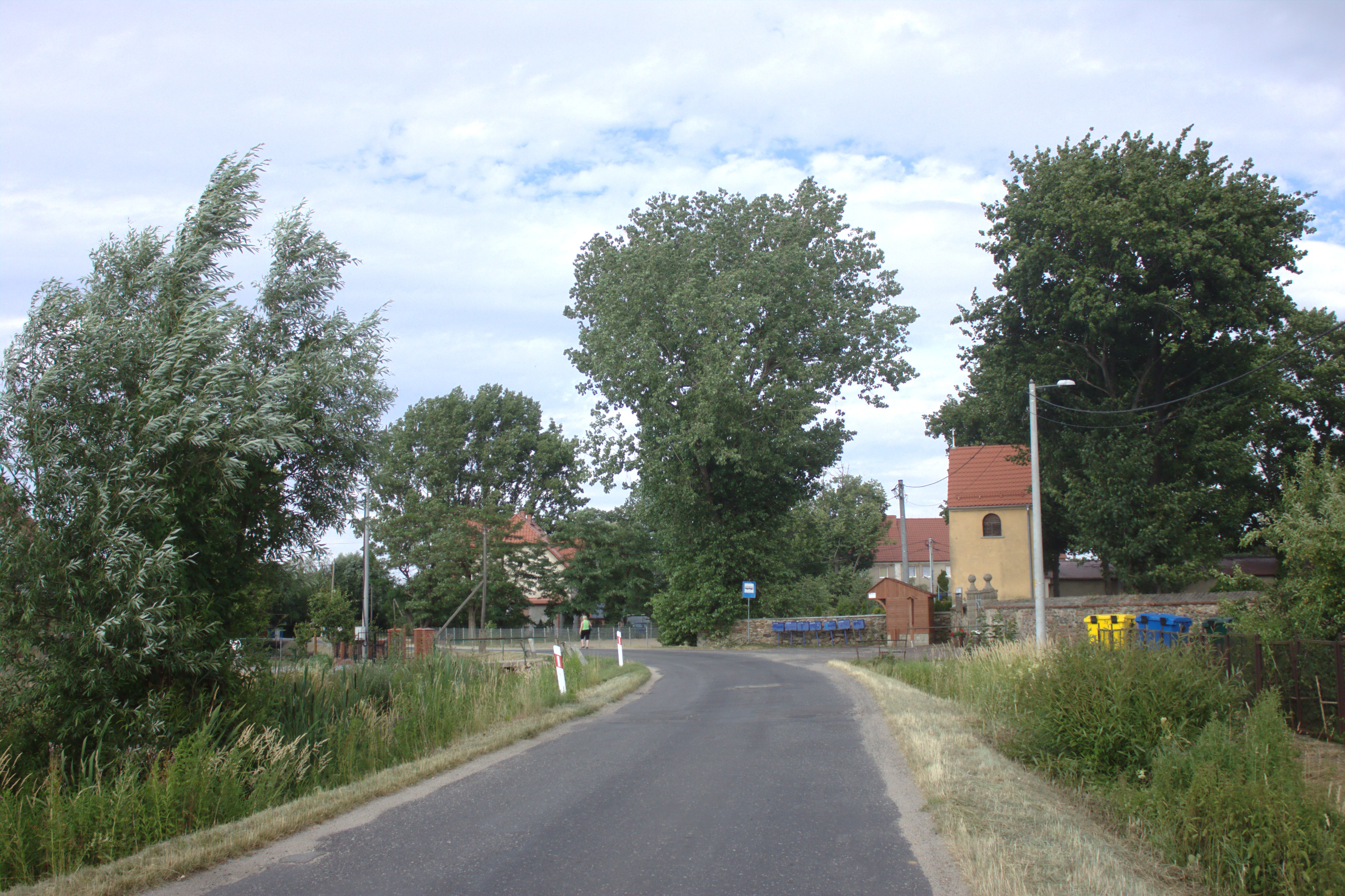
Street

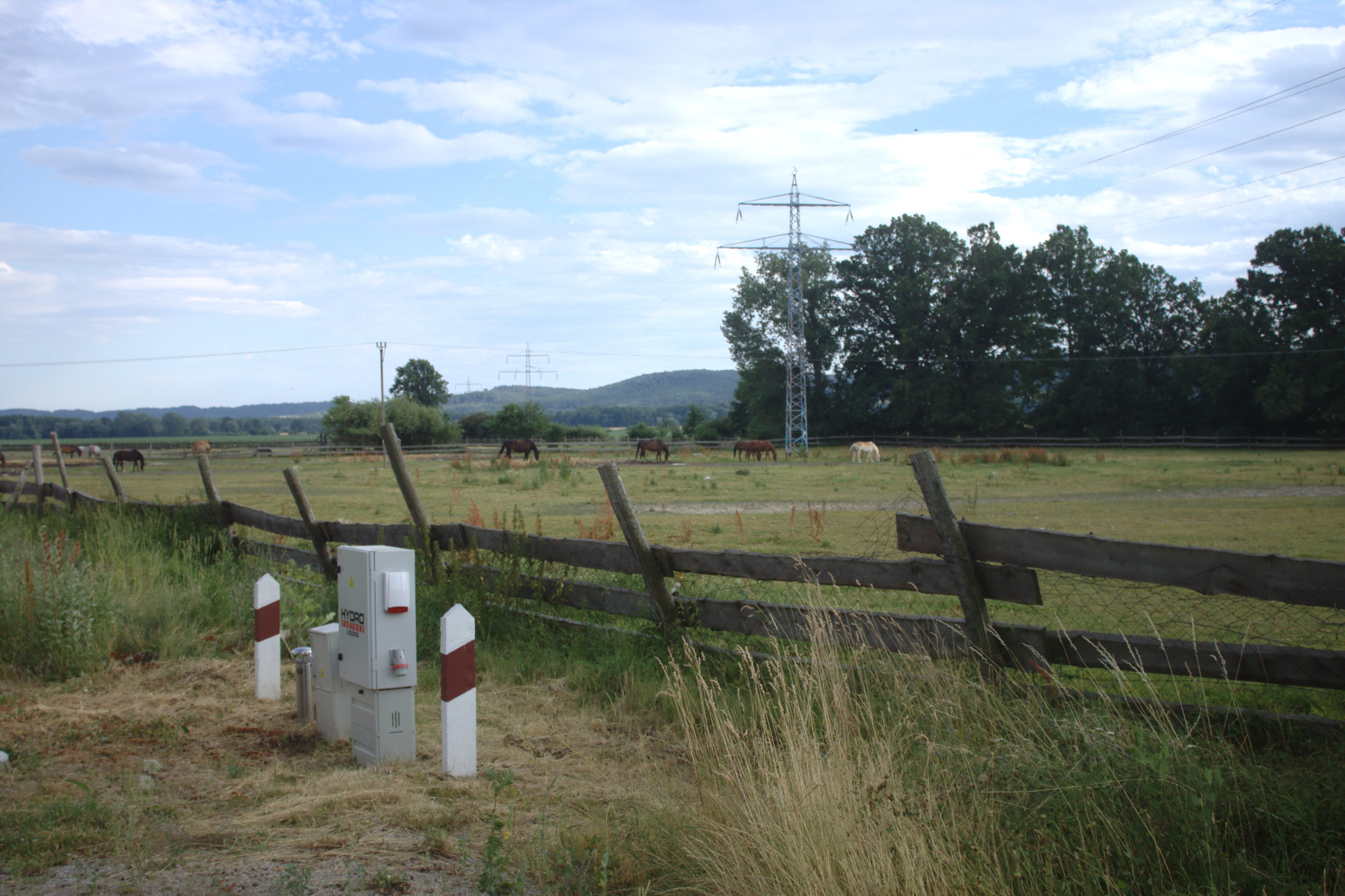
Pasture
