= Kłaczyna =

- Village
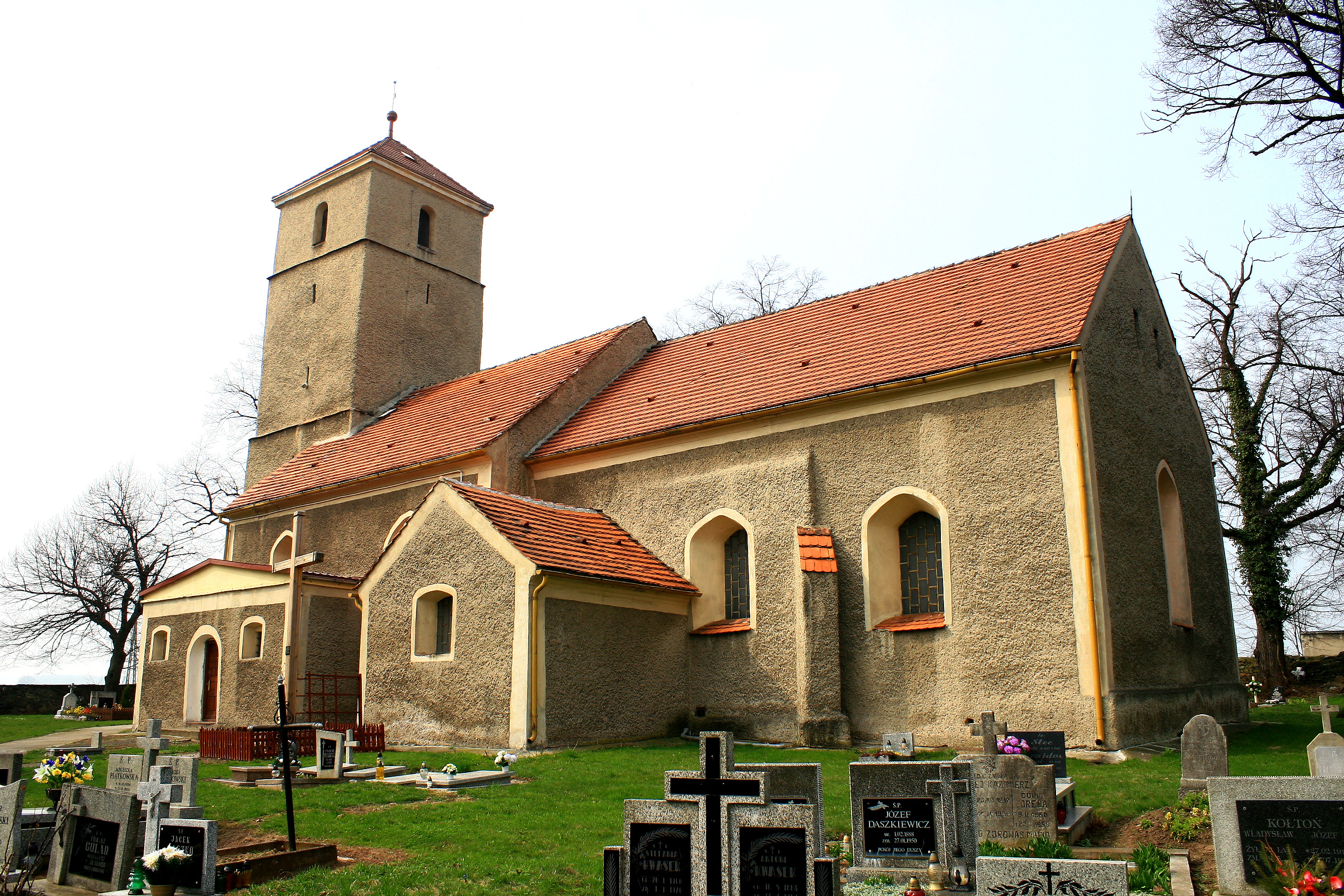
- Church of St. Jacob and Anna

- Location within Poland
- Coordinates: 50°56′42″N 16°12′03″E
- Country: Poland
- Voivodeship: Lower Silesian
- County: Świdnica
- Gmina: Dobromierz

Kłaczyna [kwaˈt͡ʂɨna] is a village in the administrative district of Gmina Dobromierz, within Świdnica County, Lower Silesian Voivodeship, in south-western Poland.
