= Czernica, Świdnica County =

Czernica
- Village
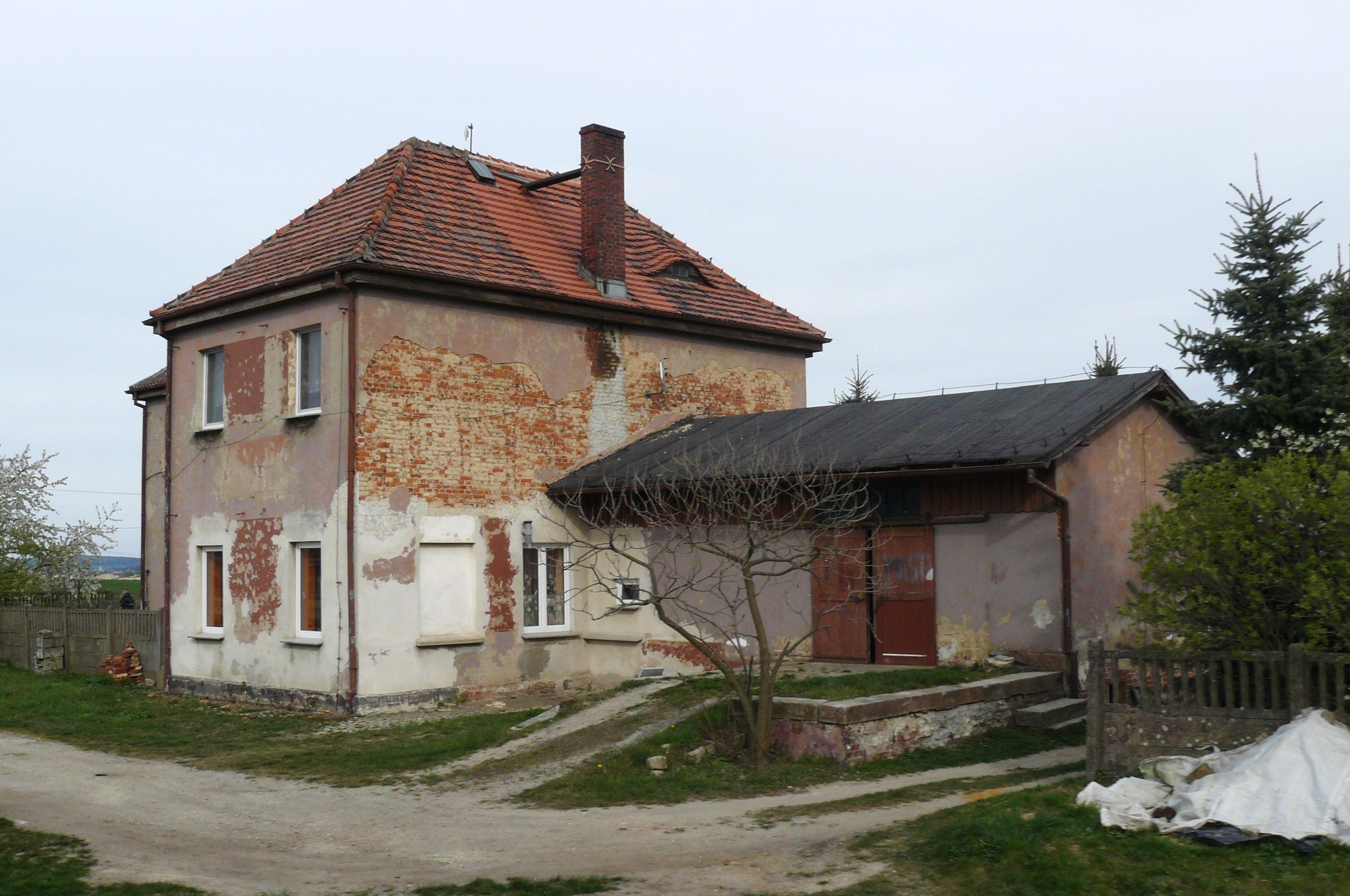
- MOs810, WG 2015 16, Dolnoslaskie Zakamarki (Czernica)

- Location within Poland
- Coordinates: 51°00′44″N 16°12′33″E
- Country: Poland
- Voivodeship: Lower Silesian
- County: Świdnica
- Gmina: Dobromierz

Czernica [t͡ʂɛrˈnit͡sa] is a village in the administrative district of Gmina Dobromierz, within Świdnica County, Lower Silesian Voivodeship, in south-western Poland.
