= Gniewków =

- Village
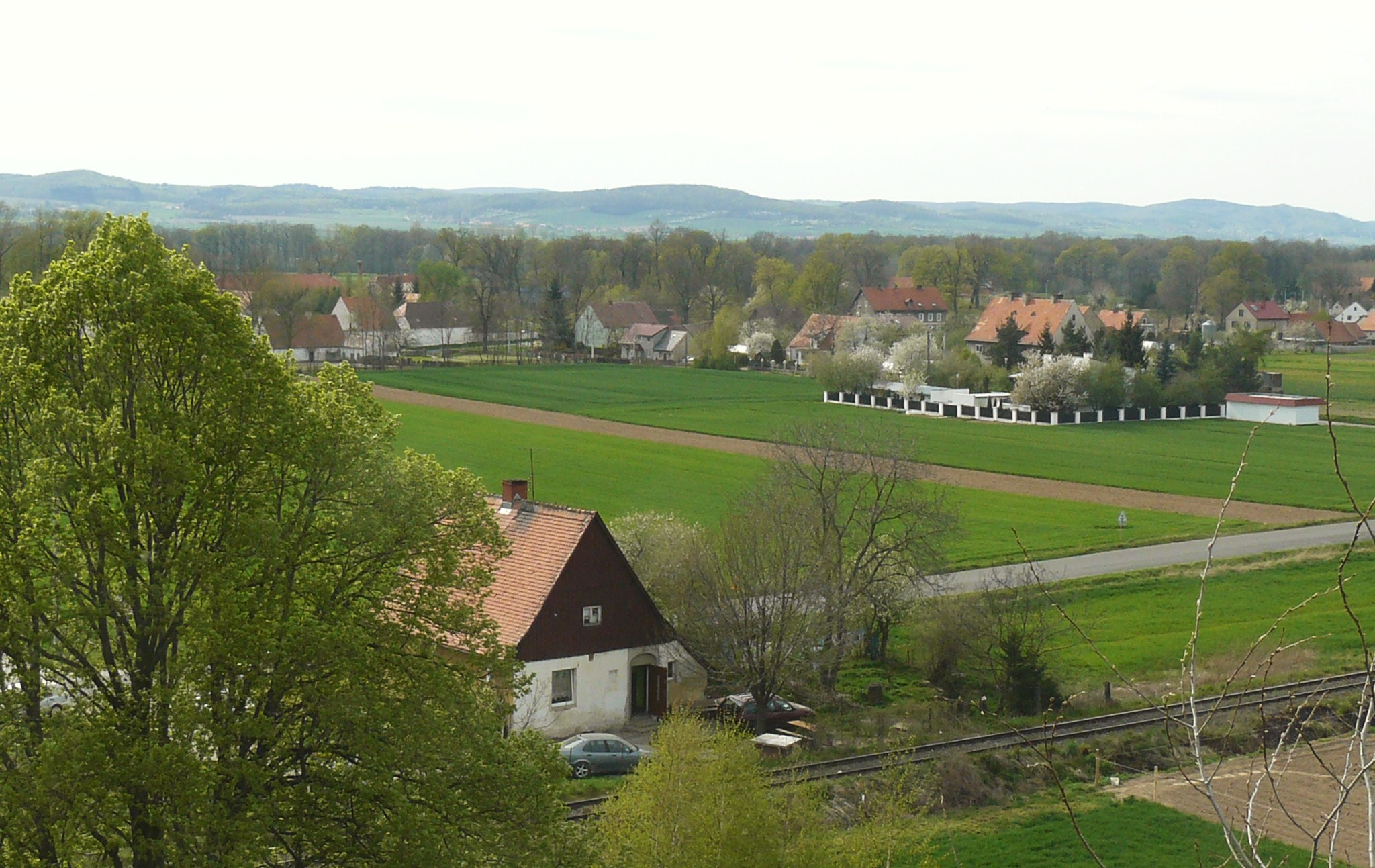

- Location within Poland
- Coordinates: 50°59′45″N 16°13′12″E
- Country: Poland
- Voivodeship: Lower Silesian
- County: Świdnica
- Gmina: Dobromierz

Gniewków [ˈɡɲɛfkuf] is a village in the administrative district of Gmina Dobromierz, within Świdnica County, Lower Silesian Voivodeship, in south-western Poland.

== Notable residents ==
- Katja Ebstein (born 1945), singer
