= Bukowski (surname) =

Bukowski (feminine Bukowska) is a Polish surname. It is composed of buk (Common Slavic for "beech tree") and the suffixes -ow and -ski. In some cases, the name may originate from a toponym, i.e. the name would have been given to or adopted by a person or family from a place named Buków, for example.

Language	Masculine	Feminine	Plural
Polish	Bukowski [buˈkɔfskʲi]	Bukowska [buˈkɔfska]	Bukowscy [buˈkɔfst͡sɨ]
Belarusian (Romanization)	Букоўскі (Bukoŭski)	Букоўская (Bukoŭskaja, Bukouskaya)	
Bulgarian (Romanization)	Буковски (Bukovski)	Буковска (Bukovska)	
Czech, Slovak	Bukovský	Bukovská	
Lithuanian	Bukauskas	Bukauskienė (married); Bukauskaitė (unmarried)	
Russian (Romanization)	Буковский (Bukovsky, Bukovskiy, Bukovskij)	Буковская (Bukovskaya, Bukovskaia, Bukovskaja)	
Ukrainian (Romanization)	Буковський (Bukovskyi, Bukovskyy, Bukovskyj)	Буковська (Bukovska)	

== People ==
- Adrian Bukowski, Polish footballer
- Aleksandra Bukowska-McCabe (born 1977), Polish diplomat
- Annamaria Orla-Bukowska, Polish social anthropologist
- Barbara Hesse-Bukowska (1930–2013), Polish pianist
- Barbora Bukovská (attorney), Czech-Slovak human rights attorney
- Charles Bukowski (1920–1994), American poet, novelist, and short story writer
- Dorota Bukowska (born 1972), Polish basketball player
- John Bukovsky (1924–2010), Slovakia-born American prelate of the Catholic Church
- John Bukowski (1939–2001), Australian boxer
- Gary Bukowski, List of Western Suburbs Magpies players
- Helena Bukowska-Szlekys (1899–1954), Polish sculptor
- Henryk Bukowski (1839–1900), Polish nobleman, Bukowskis auction house
- Miroslav Bukovsky, Czech-Australian trumpeter and flugelhorn player, arranger and composer and bandleader of Wanderlust (jazz band).
- Piotr Bukowski (born 1963), German water polo player
- Ronald Bukowski, American oncologist, urologist, and a professor of medicine
- Stanisław Bukowski (1923–2002), Polish cross-country skier
- Vladimir Bukovsky (1942–2019), former Soviet political dissident, author and political activist

== Fictional characters ==
- Bukowski family from Poland (novel) by James Michener
- Charlie Bukowski from Cannibal Apocalypse
- Claude Hooper Bukowski from Hair (film)
- Fante Bukowski, character by Noah Van Sciver
- Stanley Bukowski, List of Oz (TV series) characters
- Ted Bukovsky from Kuffs
- Victor Bukowski from The Man with Rain in His Shoes

== Related forms ==
- Bukač (disambiguation) (surname)
- Buková (disambiguation) (place name)
- Bukov (disambiguation)
- Buków (disambiguation) (place name)
- Bukovina (place name)
- Bukowsko (place name)

== See also ==
- Bukowski (disambiguation)
