= Bukowski (disambiguation) =

Charles Bukowski was an American poet, novelist and short story writer.

Bukowski may also refer to:

- Bukowski (surname)
- Bukowski (film), a 1973 documentary film on Charles Bukowski by director Taylor Hackford
- Bukowski: Born into This, a 2003 documentary film on Charles Bukowski
- Bukowski, an unreleased film directed by James Franco in 2013
- Bukowski (band), a French musical group
- "Bukowski", a song by Modest Mouse from the 2004 album Good News for People Who Love Bad News
- "Bukowski", a song by Moose Blood off the 2014 album I'll Keep You in Mind, from Time to Time
- Bukowski Demo (Summer '12), a 2012 demo album by Moose Blood
- Bukowski Design, a Swedish toy company
- Bukowski Las, a village in Lublin Voivodeship, eastern Poland
- Bukowskis, an auction house
