= Mielęcin =

Mielęcin may refer to the following places in Poland:

- Mielęcin, Lower Silesian Voivodeship (south-west Poland)
- Mielęcin, Choszczno County in West Pomeranian Voivodeship (north-west Poland)
- Mielęcin, Pyrzyce County in West Pomeranian Voivodeship (north-west Poland)
- Mielęcin, Wałcz County in West Pomeranian Voivodeship (north-west Poland)
