= Foreningen Norden =

Scandinavian non-governmental organizations

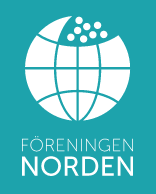
Foreningen Norden's logo

Foreningen Norden (Norwegian and Danish), Föreningen Norden (Swedish), Norræna félagið (Icelandic), Norrøna Felagið (Faroese), Peqatigiiffik Nunat Avannarliit (Greenlandic) and Pohjola-Norden (Finnish), The Norden Associations, sometimes referred to as The Nordic Associations are non-governmental organisations in the Nordic countries promoting civil cooperation between the Nordic countries. Established since 1919, there are Norden Associations in Sweden, Norway, Denmark (including Southern Schleswig), Finland, Iceland, Greenland, the Faroe Islands and Åland. Since 1965 these national branches are grouped in an umbrella organisation Foreningene Nordens Forbund (FNF), The Confederation of Norden Associations. The co-operation between the Nordic countries include projects such as Nordjobb, Nordic Library Week and Norden at the Cinema.

== History and mission ==
The first three Norden Associations were established in Denmark, Norway and Sweden in 1919, soon followed by Iceland (1922) and Finland (1924). Associations were later set up also in autonomous areas of the Faroe Islands (1951), Åland (1979) and Greenland (1991).

All Norden Associations have a common aim at promoting Nordic co-operation. This includes nurturing the sense of cultural affinity and, especially in the past, lobbying for open borders in the region. Typical activities are related to awareness raising about language, culture and social conditions in the Nordic countries. The sections publish quarterly magazines Magasinet Norden in Norway, Nordens Tidning in Sweden, Norden Nu in Denmark and Pohjola-Norden in Finland.

Associations are responsible for a range of cultural events including the annual literary festival Nordisk bibliotekuke which was organised in conjunction with the PR-Foreningen for Nordiske Biblioteker up to 2009. The festival was accompanied by an annual teddy bear event for children with a bear provided by Bukowski Design of Stockholm.

== The Confederation of the Norden Associations ==
The Confederation of the Norden Associations is an umbrella organisation for the national Norden associations and the Youth League of the Norden Associations (FNU). It also co-operates with Eesti Põhjala Ühing (the Norden Association in Estonia), Biedrība Norden Latvija (the Norden Association in Latvia) and the Norden Association in Petrozavodsk. The Confederation coordinates the joint interests of the national associations, aiming at disseminating knowledge of language, culture, history and society between the Nordic countries.

Fields of cooperation include the job exchange program Nordjobb and town twinning between Nordic countries.

The Norden Association was a proponent for the establishment of the Nordic Council, a political cooperation organisation.

== Regional Nordic Associations ==
Country / Region	Year established	Local name	Members	Local divisions	References
Denmark	1919	Foreningen Norden	13 000	100	
Norway	1919	Foreningen Norden	5 000	70	
Sweden	1919	Föreningen Norden	13 000	120	
Iceland	1922	Norræna félagið		30	
Finland	1924	Pohjola – Norden	8 000	100	
Faroe Islands	1951	Norrøna Felagið			
Åland	1979	Föreningen Norden	300		
Greenland	1991	Peqatigiiffik Nunat Avannarliit			
