= Buków =

Buków may refer to the following places in Poland:

- Buków, Lesser Poland Voivodeship (south Poland)
- Buków, Łódź Voivodeship (central Poland)
- Buków, Lower Silesian Voivodeship (south-west Poland)
- Buków, Lubusz Voivodeship (west Poland)
- Buków, Opole Voivodeship (south-west Poland)
- Buków, Podkarpackie Voivodeship (south-east Poland)
- Buków, Silesian Voivodeship (south Poland)
