= Żarów =

Town in Lower Silesian Voivodeship, Poland

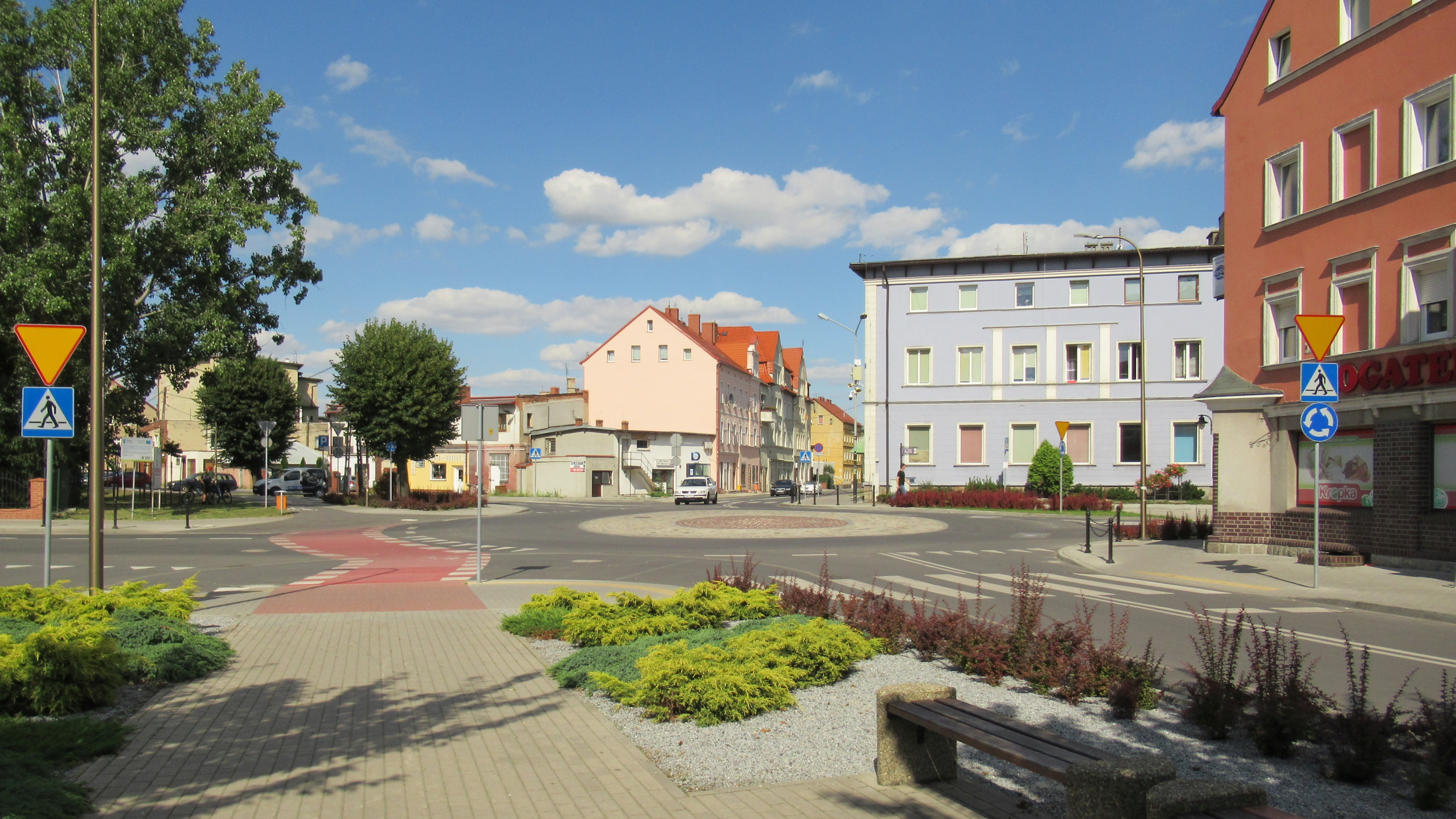

- Flag Coat of arms

- Location within Poland
- Coordinates: 50°56′N 16°29′E
- Country: Poland
- Voivodeship: Lower Silesian
- County: Świdnica
- Gmina: Żarów

Area
  - Total: 6.16 km^{2} (2.38 sq mi)

Population (2019-06-30)
  - Total: 6,719
  - Density: 1,090/km^{2} (2,830/sq mi)
- Time zone: UTC+1 (CET)
  - Summer (DST): UTC+2 (CEST)
- Postal code: 58-130
- Vehicle registration: DSW
- Website: http://www.um.zarow.pl

Żarów [ˈʐaruf] (German: Saarau) is a town in Świdnica County, Lower Silesian Voivodeship, in south-western Poland. It is the seat of the administrative district (gmina) called Gmina Żarów.

As of 2020, the town has a population of 12,335. 53.9% of the population is classified as urban, while 46.1% is classified as rural.

In 2016, town limits were expanded by including a part of the village of Mrowiny.

== Etymology ==
The name of the town is of Polish origin and comes from the word żary referring to the scorching of forests. The meaning is reflected in the coat of arms.

== Notable people ==
- Klaus von Beyme (1934–2021), political scientist
- Wilhelm Vorwerg (1899–1990), artist

== See also ==
- See twin towns of Gmina Żarów.
