= Klaus von Beyme =

German political scientist (1934–2021)

- Born: Klaus Gustav Heinrich von Beyme; 3 July 1934; Saarau, Lower Silesia, Prussia, Germany (now Poland)
- Died: 6 December 2021 (aged 87); Germany
- Occupation: Professor

Klaus Gustav Heinrich von Beyme (3 July 1934 – 6 December 2021) was a German political scientist who was professor of political science emeritus at the Faculty of Economic and Social Sciences of the University of Heidelberg.

== Education ==
Beyme was born on 3 July 1934 in Saarau, Germany. Following the German Abitur in Celle in 1954, from 1954 to 1956 Beyme initially began his studies towards a career as a publisher. Thereafter, from 1956 to 1961, he studied Political Science, History, History of Art and Sociology at the Universities of Heidelberg, Bonn, Munich, Paris and Moscow. The unusual choice of Moscow (1959–60) as a place of study was made, based on interest and on Beyme's personal history. He learned Russian in adult education courses and successfully applied to study in Moscow within the scope of a student exchange programme. From 1961 to 1962, Beyme was a Research Fellow at the Russian Research Centre of Harvard University and Assistant to Carl Joachim Friedrich, one of the world's leading political scientists in the post-World War II period. After obtaining his doctoral degree in Heidelberg in 1963, following a period as Academic Assistant, he completed his habilitation thesis in 1967.

== Career ==
Beyme then became a full professor at the Eberhard Karl University in Tübingen (1967–1973) and in 1971 was also Rector of this University for a short time. In 1972, he was appointed to the Johann Wolfgang Goethe University in Frankfurt am Main. During the period from 1973 to 1975, he was President of the German Society for Political Science.

From 1974 to 1999, Beyme was a full professor and head of the Department of Political Science at the University of Heidelberg. From 1982 to 1985, he was President of the International Political Science Association, from 1983 to 1990 a member of the Research Council at the European University Institute in Florence, in 1985 visiting professor at the École des Sciences Politiques in Paris, in 1979 visiting professor at Stanford University (California), and in 1987 and the years following, he was a Member of the Academia Europaea. In 1989, he was a visiting professor at the University of Melbourne, in Australia. From 1990 to 1993, he was a Member of the Board of the Commission for Research into Social and Political Changes in the New Federal States. Since 1999, Beyme has been Emeritus Professor.

== Theories ==
Beyme claimed there have been three extreme-right waves since 1945: The nostalgic wave: found in Germany and Italy. These parties have direct links to previous far-right governments, appearing in a time of social and economic turbulence. They quickly disappeared, however. The anti-tax wave: found mostly in France (Poujadist wave), occurred in the 1950s and 1960s. Mostly small shop-keepers complained that the little man was left behind in the process. They were also against the Jewish prime minister. The new/third wave: a pan-European trend which appeared during the 1980s. It is the most significant of the three waves and is still going on to this day.

== Awards and offices ==
Beyme had repeatedly been accorded recognition for his scientific activities, amongst others, in 1995 Honorary Membership of the Humboldt University in Berlin, in 1998 the University Medal of the University of Heidelberg, and in 2001 an Honorary Doctorate from the University of Bern. Furthermore, he was a Member of the Academia Europaea and the Berlin-Brandenburg Academy of Sciences. In 2008, he was honoured with the Schader Prize. On 2 September 2010, Beyme was honoured for his "enormous contribution to the development of Political Science in Europe and the entire world" and for his many years as professor of political science at different universities around the world with an Honorary Professorship at Lomonosov University in Moscow. In particular, he has contributed significantly to the development of relationships between Lomonosov University and German universities, as mentioned in the laudatory speeches. The conferring of this honour took place within the scope of a ceremonial act, to which the Rector of Moscow University had issued invitations, in the presence of the Mayor of Moscow, Yury Mikhaylovich Luzhkov.

On 12 July 2012, at the 22nd World Congress of Political Science of the International Political Science Association (IPSA) in Madrid (Spain), was held the award session of the Prize of the Foundation Mattei Dogan awarded by the International Political Science Association for High Achievement in Political Science. The recipient of the 2012 award was Klaus von Beyme.

A study in 1998 indicated that Beyme was ranked number 10 amongst the world's Political Scientists, the only German in the Top Ten. Beyme's exceptional importance in this area is also seen at the German level. 41 per cent of the scientists questioned considered him as the most important representative of Political Science in Germany. He is ranked second regarding the question of the most important representatives in this area in respect of their "professional political importance". Once again, most of those questioned believed that he has the best reputation of all Political Scientists in the public eye.

Twice Beyme has been amongst the most important representatives of individual fields of research: both for the thematic area, "Political Theory, Political Philosophy and History of Ideas" and for the specialist area, "Comparative Political Science / System Comparison". (Klingemann/Falter 1998)

== Personal life ==
His parents, Wilhelm von Beyme (1901–1968) and wife Dorothee von Rümker (1906–1997), were landowners in Silesia and later hoteliers. Beyme was married to Maja von Oertzen (born 28 October 1935 in Rostock, Mecklenburg), daughter of the Superior Councillor and Attorney, Detlof von Oertzen, and wife Viktoria von Blücher. Since the age of 24, Beyme had been a member of the Social Democratic Party (SPD). The Prussian minister of state, reformer and adversary of Hardenberg and Stein, Carl Friedrich von Beyme, was one of his ancestors.

Beyme died on 6 December 2021, at the age of 87.

== Books/edited volumes (selection) ==
- Der Föderalismus in der Sowjetunion. Quelle & Meyer, Heidelberg 1964, (englische Kurzversion in: Public Policy 1964).
- Das präsidentielle Regierungssystem der Vereinigten Staaten in der Lehre der Herrschaftsformen. Müller, Karlsruhe 1967.
- Die verfassungsgebende Gewalt des Volkes. Mohr, Tübingen 1968, (Greek: Syntaktikh efoysia toy laoy, Athen: Ekdoseis (1987)).
- Politische Ideengeschichte – Probleme eines interdisziplinären Forschungsbereichs. Mohr, Tübingen 1969.
- Interessengruppen in der Demokratie. Piper, München 1969; 5. Aufl. 1980, (span.: Los grupos de presión en la Democracia. Belgrano, Buenos Aires 1986).
- Das politische System Italiens. Kohlhammer, Stuttgart 1970.
- Die politische Elite in der Bundesrepublik Deutschland. Piper, München 1971; 2. Aufl. 1974.
- Vom Faschismus zur Entwicklungsdiktatur. Machtelite und Opposition in Spanien. Piper, München 1971.
- Die politischen Theorien der Gegenwart. Piper, München 1972; 8. Aufl., Westdeutscher Verlag, Wiesbaden 2000, (span.: Teorías politicas contemporaneas. Instituto des estudios políticos, Madrid 1977), (serbokroat.: Suvremene politicke teorije. Stvarnost, Zagreb 1975), (Chinese.: Dangdai zhengzhi lilun. Shangwu, Peking 1990), (poln.: Wspólczesne teorie polityczne. Scholar, Warschau 2005).
- Ökonomie und Politik im Sozialismus. Ein Vergleich der Entwicklung in den sozialistischen Ländern. Piper, München 1975, paperback edition 1977, (engl.: Economics and Politics within Socialist Systems. Praeger, New York 1982).
- Gewerkschaften und Arbeitsbeziehungen in kapitalistischen Ländern. Piper, München 1977 (engl.: Challenge to Power. Trade Unions and Industrial Relations in Capitalist Countries. Sage, London 1980).
- Sozialismus oder Wohlfahrtsstaat? Sozialpolitik und Sozialstruktur der Sowjetunion im Systemvergleich, München: Piper (1977), (Englische Kurzversion in: International Political Science Review (1981)).
- Das politische System der Bundesrepublik Deutschland, Wiesbaden: Westdeutscher Verlag, (1979), 2010 11. Aufl. (VS Verlag für Sozialwissenschaften), (engl.: The Political System of the Federal Republic of Germany, Aldershot: Gower/New York: St. Martin's Press (1983)), (slowen.: Politični sistem Zvezne Republike Nemčije, Koper: Visokošolsko središče (2002)).
- Parteien in westlichen Demokratien, München: Piper (1982); 2. Aufl. 1984, (engl.: Political Parties in Western Democracies., New York: St. Martin's Press (1985)), (span.: Los partidos políticos en las democracias occidentales, Madrid: Siglo ventiuno (1986)), (ital.: I partiti nelle democrazie occidentali, Bologna: Zanichelli (1987)).
- Die Sowjetunion in der Weltpolitik, München: Piper (1983); 2nd edition 1985, (engl.: The Soviet Union in World Politics, New York: St. Martin's Press (1987)).
- Der Wiederaufbau. Architektur und Städtebaupolitik in beiden deutschen Staaten, München: Piper (1987).
- Der Vergleich in der Politikwissenschaft, München: Piper (1988).
- Right Wing Extremism in Western Europe, London: Frank Cass Publishers (1988).
- Hauptstadtsuche. Hauptstadtfunktionen im Interessenkonflikt zwischen Bonn und Berlin, Frankfurt am Main: Suhrkamp (1991).
- Theorie der Politik im 20. Jahrhundert. Von der Moderne zur Postmoderne, Frankfurt am Main: Suhrkamp (1991); 3. Aufl. 1996, 4. Aufl. 2007, (Span.: Teoría politíca del siglo XX. De la modernidad a la postmodernidad, Madrid: Alianza (1994)).
- Die politische Klasse im Parteienstaat, Frankfurt am Main: Suhrkamp (1993); 2. Aufl. 1995, (span.: La classe política en el Estado de partídos, Madrid: Alianza (1995)), (ital.: Classe politica a partitocrazia, Turin: UTET (1997)).
- Systemwechsel in Osteuropa, Frankfurt am Main: Suhrkamp (1994), (engl.: Transition to Democracy in Eastern Europe. London: MacMillan (1996)), (Korean.: talsahoezu ue wa zese joenwhan, Seokang Dae Hak Kyoe Zalpanbu (2000)).
- Transition to Democracy in Eastern Europe, London: Palgrave Macmillan (1996).
- Der Gesetzgeber: Der Bundestag als Entscheidungszentrum (1997), (engl.: Parliament as a Decision-Making Centre. The Case of Germany, New York: St. Martin's Press (1998)).
- Kulturpolitik zwischen staatlicher Steuerung und Gesellschaftlicher Autonomie, Opladen: Westdeutscher Verlag (1998).
- Die Kunst der Macht und die Gegenmacht der Kunst, Frankfurt am Main: Suhrkamp (1998).
- The Legislator: German Parliament as a Centre of Political Decision Making, Aldershot: Ashgate (1998).
- Die parlamentarische Demokratie, Opladen: Westdeutscher Verlag (1999).
- Parliamentary Democracy. Democratization, Destabilization, Reconsolidation 1789-1999, Basingstoke: Macmillan (2000)
- Parteien im Wandel (2000), 2. Aufl., 2002, (kroat.: Transformacija političkih stranaka, Zagreb: Politička misao (2002)).
- Politische Theorien in Russland 1789-1945, Wiesbaden: Westdeutscher Verlag (2001).
- Politische Theorien im Zeitalter der Ideologien, Wiesbaden: Westdeutscher Verlag (2002).
- Das Zeitalter der Avantgarden. Kunst und Gesellschaft 1905-1955, München: C.H. Beck (2005).
- Föderalismus und regionales Bewusstsein. Ein internationaler Vergleich, München: C.H. Beck (2007).
- Die Faszination des Exotischen. Exotismus, Rassismus und Sexismus in der Europäischen Kunst, München: Fink (2008).
- Geschichte der politischen Theorien in Deutschland 1300-2000, Wiesbaden: VS Verlag für Sozialwissenschaften (2009).
- Vergleichende Politikwissenschaft, Wiesbaden: VS Verlag für Sozialwissenschaften (2010).
- Kulturpolitik in Deutschland. Von der Staatskulturförderung zur Kreativwirtschaft, Wiesbaden, VS für Sozialwissenschaften (2012).
- Von der Postdemokratie zur Neodemokratie, Wiesbaden, VS Springer (2013) (engl.: From Post-Democracy to Neo-Democracy, Heidelberg, Springer (2018)).
- Liberalismus. Theorien des Liberalismus und Radikalismus im Zeitalter der Ideologien 1789-1945, Wiesbaden, Springer VS (2013).
- Konservatismus. Theorien des Konservatismus und Rechtsextremismus im Zeitalter der Ideologien 1789-1945, Wiesbaden, Springer VS (2013).
- Sozialismus. Theorien des Sozialismus, Anarchismus und Kommunismus im Zeitalter der Ideologien 1789-1945, Wiesbaden, Springer VS (2013).
- Pioneer in the Study of Political Theory and Comparative Politics, Heidelberg, VS Springer (Springer Briefs on Pioneers in Science and Practice 14) (2014).
- On Politic Culture, Cultural Policy, Art and Politics, Heidelberg, VS Springer, (Springer Briefs in Science and Practice. Texts and protocols 15) (2014).
- Religionsgemeinschaften, Zivilgesellschaft und Staat: Zum Verhältnis von Politik und Religion in Deutschland, Wiesbaden, VS Springer, (2015).
- Die Russland-Kontroverse. Eine Analyse des ideologischen Konflikts zwischen Russland-Verstehern und Russland-Kritikern, Wiesbaden, VS Springer, (2016) (2. Aufl. 2018).
- Bruchstücke der Erinnerung eines Sozialwissenschaftlers, Wiesbaden, VS Springer, (2016).
- Rechtspopulismus – Ein Element der Neodemokratie, Wiesbaden, VS Springer, (2018) (engl.: Rightwing Populism. An Element auf Neodemocracy, Wiesbaden, VS Springer, (2019)).
- Berlin. Von der Hauptstadtsuche zur Hauptstadtfindung, Wiesbaden, VS Springer, (2019).
- Migrationspolitik. Über Erfolge und Misserfolge, Wiesbaden, VS Springer, (2020).

== Articles ==
- Parlamentarische Demokratie, Politikverdrossenheit und die Demokratiereform in Deutschland, in: Robertson-von Trotha, Caroline Y. (ed.): Herausforderung Demokratie. Demokratisch, parlamentarisch, gut? (= Kulturwissenschaft interdisziplinär/Interdisciplinary Studies on Culture and Society, Vol. 6), Baden-Baden, 2011, 29–45.
- The German Constitutional Court in an Uneasy Triangle between Parliament, Government and the Federal Laender, In: Wojciech Sadurski (ed.): Constitutional Justice, East and West. Den Haag, Kluwer, 2002, 101–118.
- Institutional Engineering and Transition to Democracy In: Jan Zielonka (ed.): Democratic Consolidation in Eastern Europe. Oxford, Oxford University Press, 2001, pp. 3–24.
- Elite Relations in Germany, German Politics, Vol. 10, No. 2, pp. 19–36.
- Citizenship and the European Union, In: Klaus Eder/Bernhard Giesen (ed.): European Citizenship between National Legacies and Postnational Projects. Oxford, Oxford University Press, 2001, pp. 61–85.
- The Bundestag - Still the Centre of Decision-Making?, In: Helms, Ludger (ed.): Institutions and Institutional Change in the Federal Republic of Germany. Basingstoke, Macmillan: pp. 32–47.
- Federalism in Russia, In: Ute Wachendorfer-Schmidt (ed.): Federalism and Political Performance. London, Routledge 2000, pp. 23–39.
- Shifting national identities : the case of German history, National Identities, No. 1, 1999, pp. 39–52.
- German political science: the state of the art, European Journal of Political Research 20 (3-4), 1991, 263–278.
