= Chorowice =

- Village
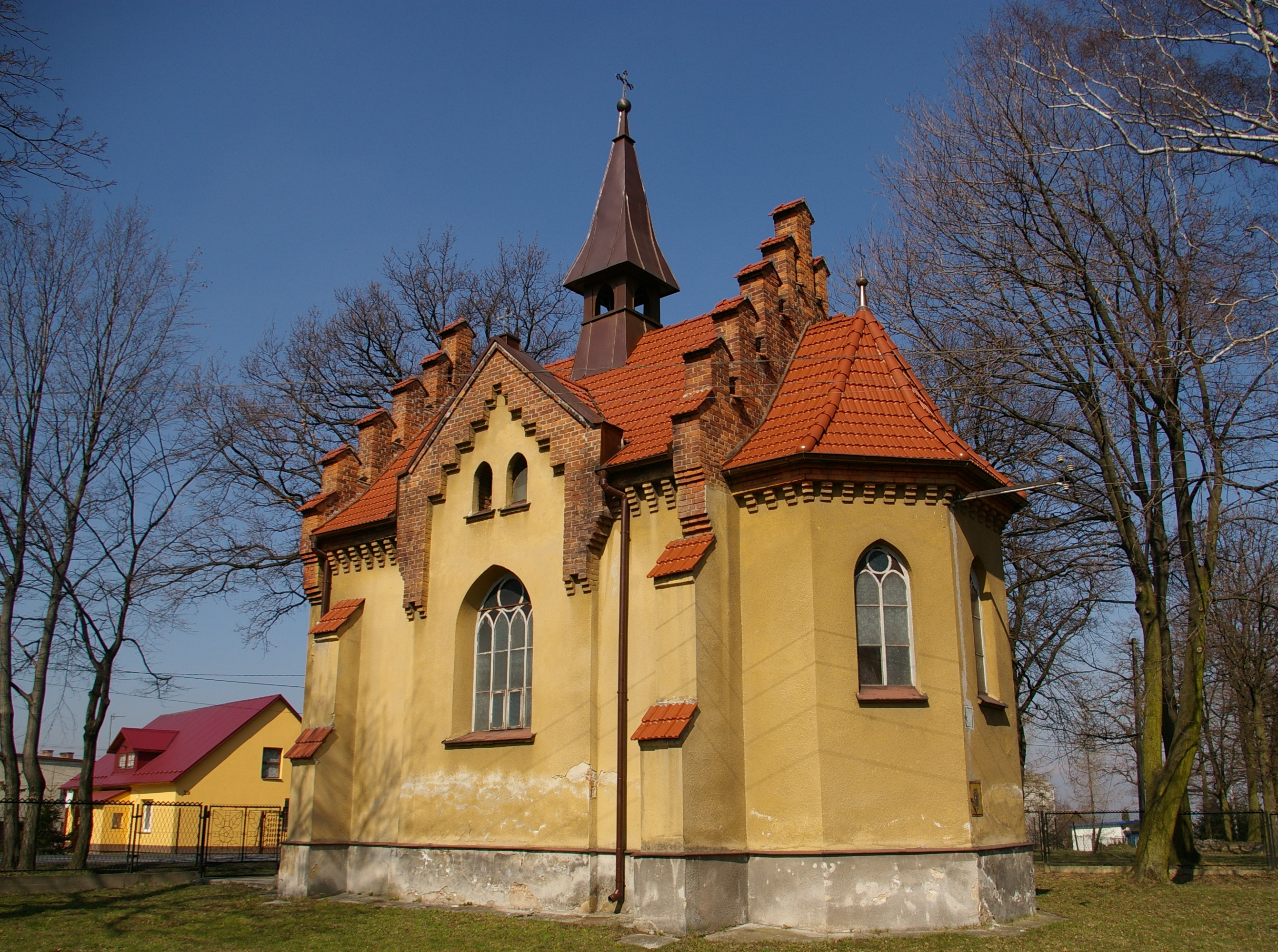
- Neo-Gothic chapel

- Location within Poland
- Coordinates: 49°58′N 19°52′E
- Country: Poland
- Voivodeship: Lesser Poland
- County: Kraków
- Gmina: Mogilany
- Population: 600

Chorowice [xɔrɔˈvit͡sɛ] is a village in the administrative district of Gmina Mogilany, within Kraków County, Lesser Poland Voivodeship, in southern Poland.
