= Kalno =

- Village
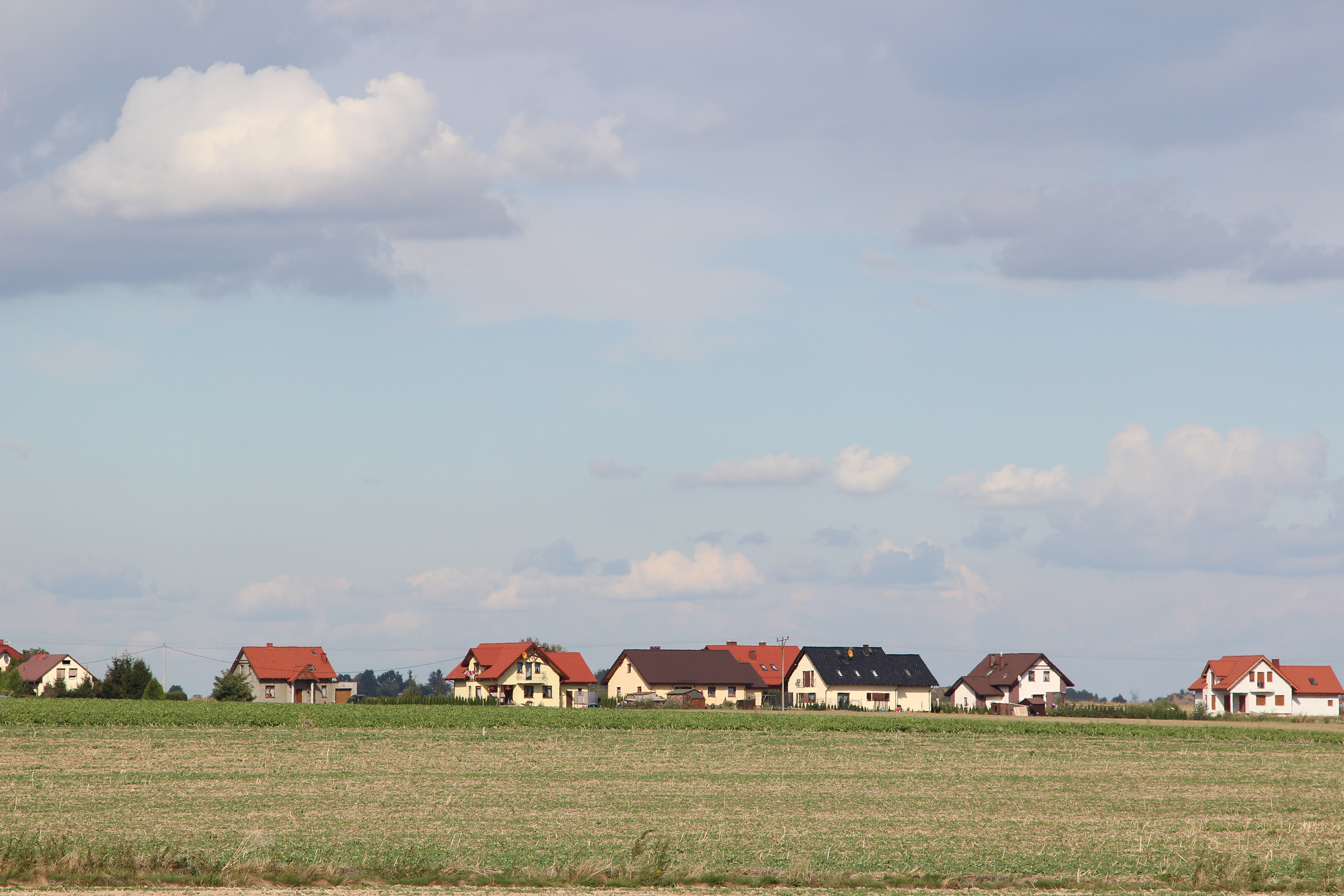
- Kalno view from conciliation cross site 2014

- Location within Poland
- Coordinates: 50°55′31″N 16°31′25″E
- Country: Poland
- Voivodeship: Lower Silesian
- County: Świdnica
- Gmina: Żarów
- Population (approx.): 320

Kalno [ˈkalnɔ] is a village in the administrative district of Gmina Żarów, within Świdnica County, Lower Silesian Voivodeship, in south-western Poland.
