= Gmina Mogilany =

Gmina Mogilany Mogilany Commune
- Gmina
- Flag Coat of arms
- Interactive map of Gmina Mogilany
- Coordinates (Mogilany): 49°56′18″N 19°53′31″E
- Country: Poland
- Voivodeship: Lesser Poland
- County: Kraków County
- Seat: Mogilany

Area
  - Total: 43.55 km^{2} (16.81 sq mi)

Population (2006)
  - Total: 11,141
  - Density: 255.8/km^{2} (662.6/sq mi)
- Website: http://www.mogilany.pl

Gmina Mogilany is a rural gmina (administrative district) in Kraków County, Lesser Poland Voivodeship, in southern Poland. Its seat is the village of Mogilany, which lies approximately 15 kilometres (9 mi) south of the regional capital Kraków.

The gmina covers an area of 43.55 square kilometres (16.8 sq mi), and as of 2006 its total population is 11,141.

== Villages ==
Gmina Mogilany contains the villages and settlements of Brzyczyna, Buków, Chorowice, Gaj, Konary, Kulerzów, Libertów, Lusina, Mogilany and Włosań.

== Neighbouring gminas ==
Gmina Mogilany is bordered by the city of Kraków and by the gminas of Myślenice, Siepraw, Skawina and Świątniki Górne.
