= Nordjobb =

Nordjobb is a Nordic exchange programme that offers young people seasonal work in the Nordic countries. Nordjobb also provides its applicants with accommodation during their stay, and organizes culture and leisure activities.

== Overview ==
The programme was first initiated in 1985, and has since provided seasonal work for ca 30.000 applicants. Nordjobb is a nonprofit project; the main financiers are the Nordic Council of Ministers and Foreningen Norden. Nordjobb has offices in Denmark, Finland, Iceland and the self-governing area of Åland.

== Requirements ==
Before 2010, Nordjobb only accepted applications from the 5 Nordic countries (Sweden, Denmark, Norway, Iceland and Finland). In 2010 an initiative called Nordjobb Europa was launched, and since then, applications from within the European Union are also accepted. All applicants must be between 18 and 30 years of age, and have knowledge in a Scandinavian language.
