= Zastruże, Lower Silesian Voivodeship =

Zastruże
- Village
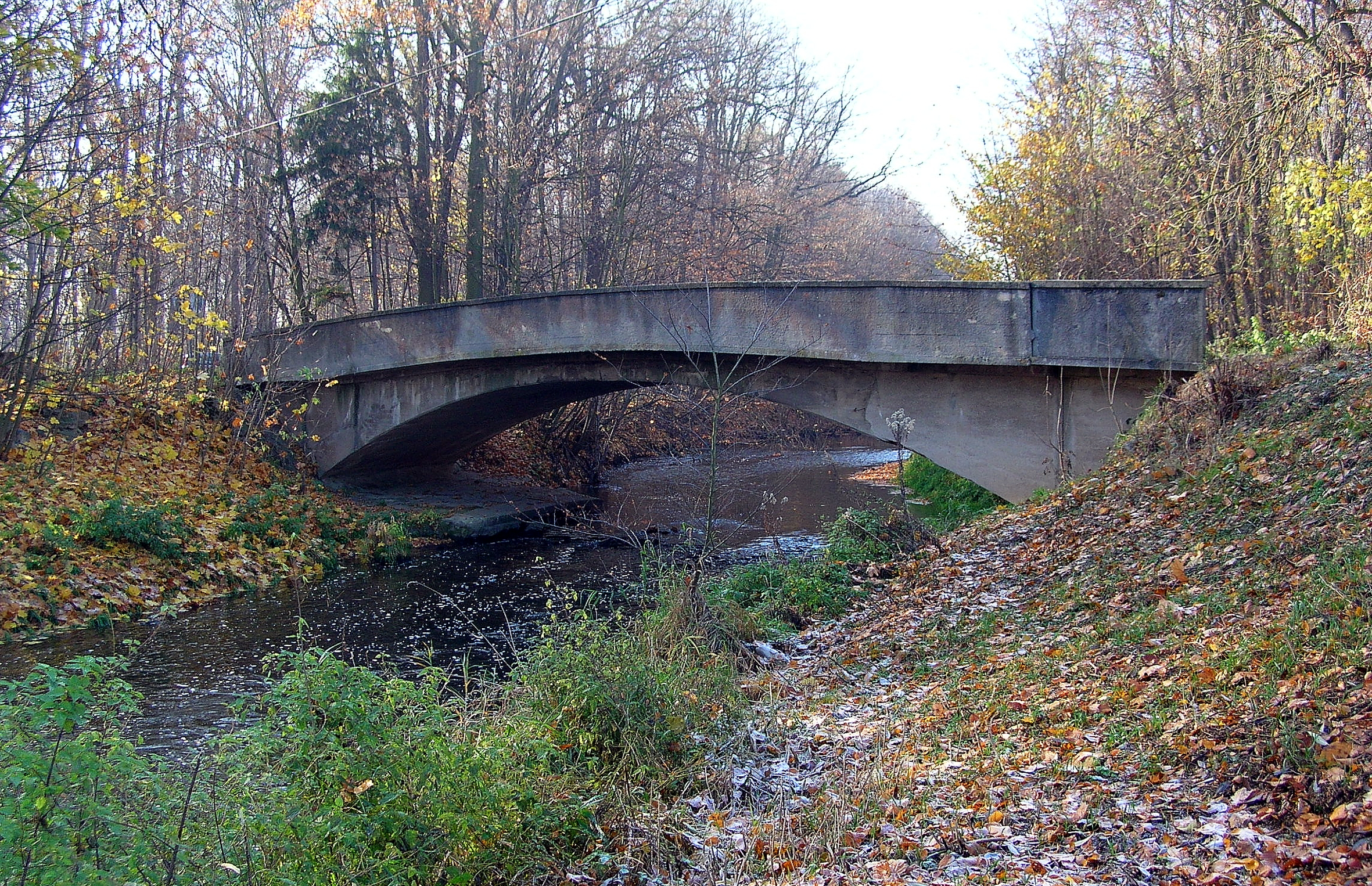

- Location within Poland
- Coordinates: 50°59′N 16°31′E
- Country: Poland
- Voivodeship: Lower Silesian
- County: Świdnica
- Gmina: Żarów

Zastruże [zaˈstruʐɛ] is a village in the administrative district of Gmina Żarów, within Świdnica County, Lower Silesian Voivodeship, in south-western Poland.
