= Bukov =

Bukov may refer to:

== People ==
- Boris Bukov (born 1935), Soviet spy
- Emilian Bukov (1909–1984), Soviet Moldavian writer and poet

== Places in the Czech Republic ==
- Bukov (Žďár nad Sázavou District), a municipality and village
- Bukov, a village and part of Hořovičky
- Bukov, an administrative part of Ústí nad Labem
