= Brzyczyna =

- Village
- Location within Poland
- Coordinates: 49°58′N 19°53′E
- Country: Poland
- Voivodeship: Lesser Poland
- County: Kraków
- Gmina: Mogilany

Brzyczyna [bʐɨˈt͡ʂɨna] is a village in the administrative district of Gmina Mogilany, within Kraków County, Lesser Poland Voivodeship, in southern Poland.
