= Kruków, Lower Silesian Voivodeship =

Kruków
- Village
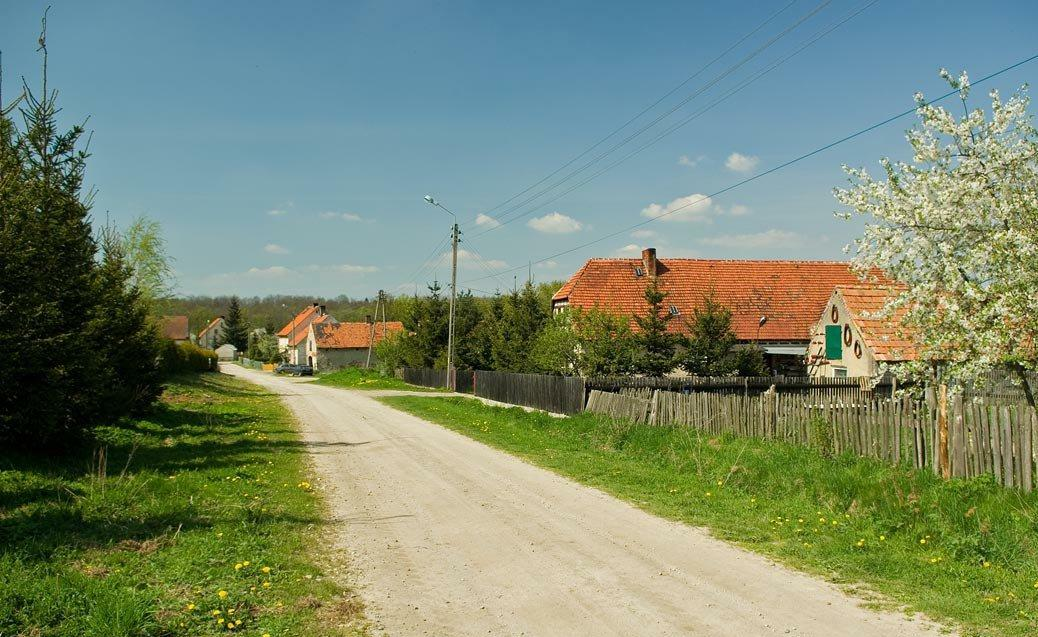

- Location within Poland
- Coordinates: 50°58′26″N 16°30′42″E
- Country: Poland
- Voivodeship: Lower Silesian
- County: Świdnica
- Gmina: Żarów

Kruków [ˈkrukuf] is a village in the administrative district of Gmina Żarów, within Świdnica County, Lower Silesian Voivodeship, in south-western Poland.
