= Wierzbna, Lower Silesian Voivodeship =

Wierzbna
- Village
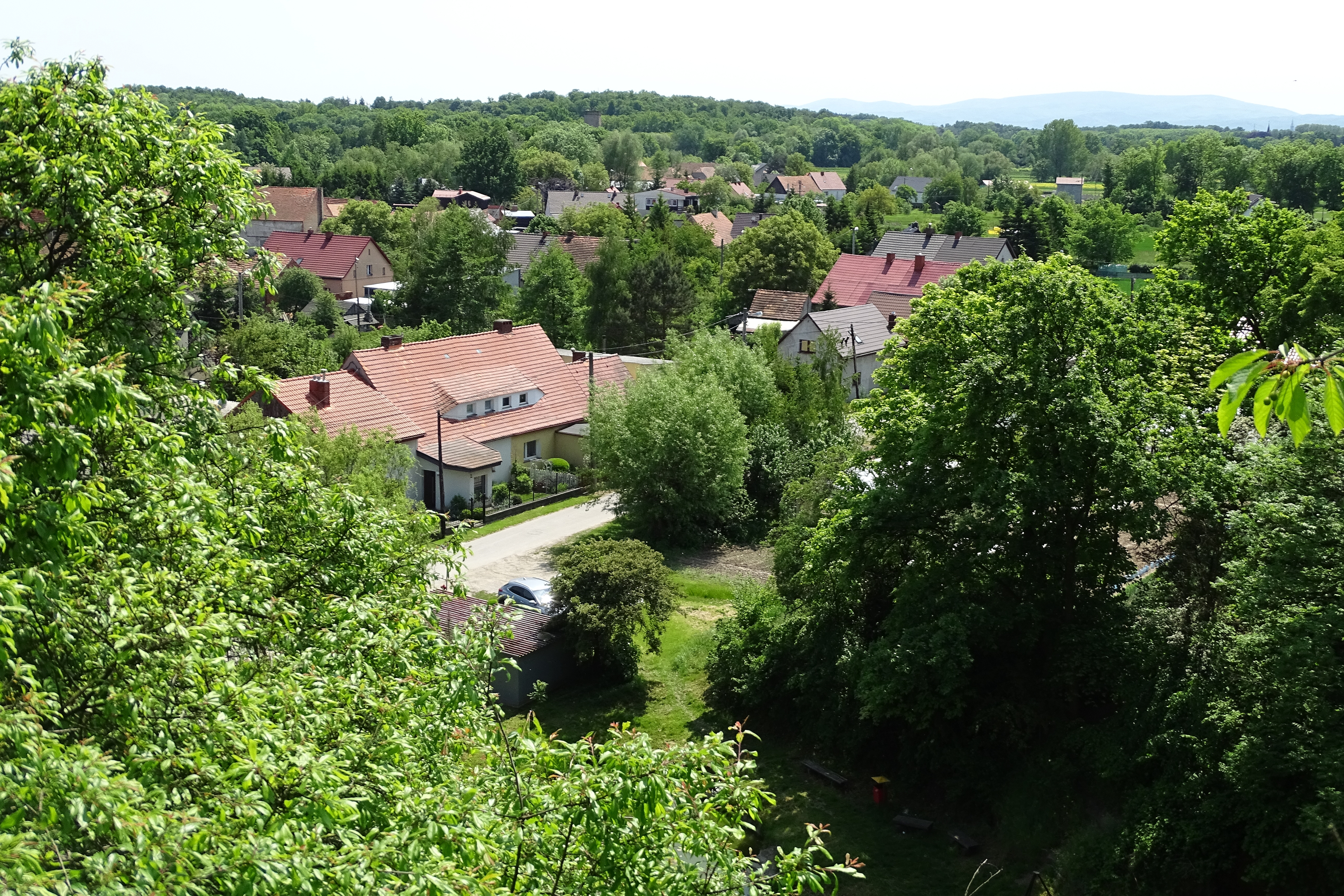

- Location within Poland
- Coordinates: 50°53′N 16°30′E
- Country: Poland
- Voivodeship: Lower Silesian
- County: Świdnica
- Gmina: Żarów
- Population: 600

Wierzbna [ˈvjɛʐbna] is a village in the administrative district of Gmina Żarów, within Świdnica County, Lower Silesian Voivodeship, in south-western Poland.
