= Włosań =

- Village
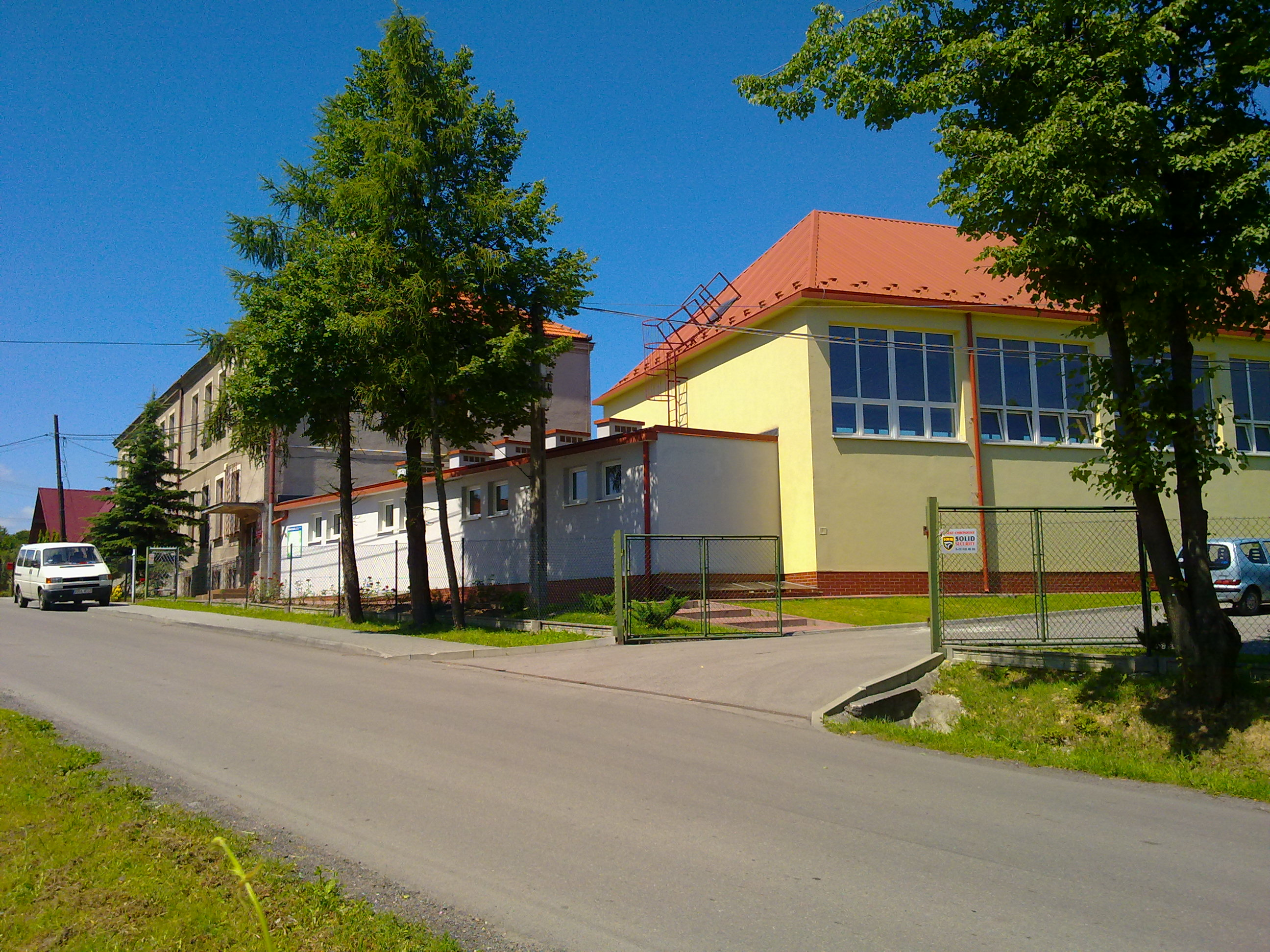
- School

- Location within Poland
- Coordinates: 49°55′N 19°55′E
- Country: Poland
- Voivodeship: Lesser Poland
- County: Kraków
- Gmina: Mogilany

Włosań [ˈvwɔsaɲ] is a village in the administrative district of Gmina Mogilany, within Kraków County, Lesser Poland Voivodeship, in southern Poland.
