= Bożanów =

- Village
- Location within Poland
- Coordinates: 50°55′18″N 16°30′23″E
- Country: Poland
- Voivodeship: Lower Silesian
- County: Świdnica
- Gmina: Żarów

Bożanów [bɔˈʐanuf] is a village in the administrative district of Gmina Żarów, within Świdnica County, Lower Silesian Voivodeship, in south-western Poland.
