= Libertów =

- Village
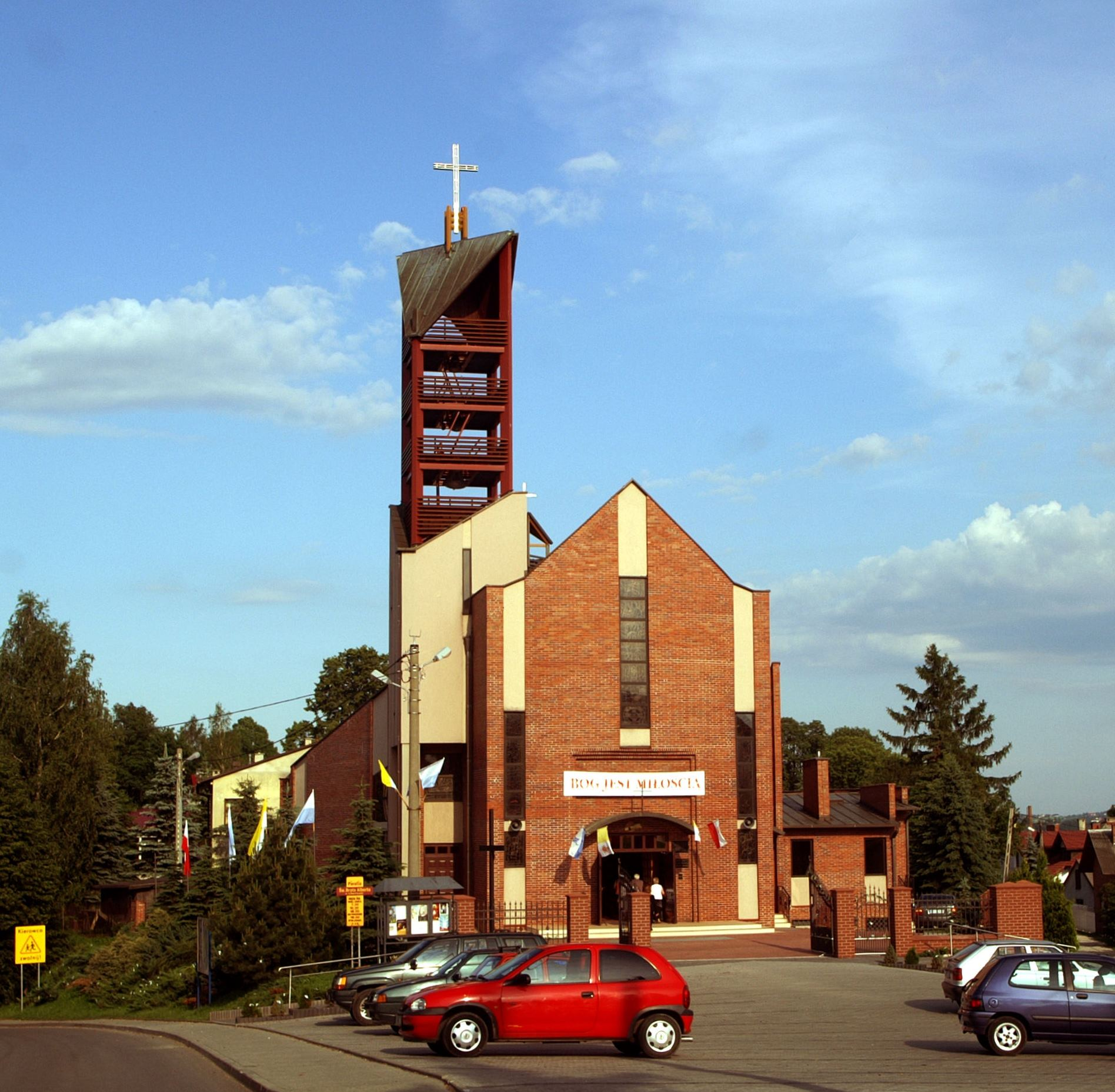
- Brother Albert church

- Location within Poland
- Coordinates: 49°58′N 19°53′E
- Country: Poland
- Voivodeship: Lesser Poland
- County: Kraków
- Gmina: Mogilany
- Highest elevation: 325 m (1,066 ft)
- Lowest elevation: 230 m (750 ft)
- Population: 1,952

Libertów [liˈbɛrtuf] is a village in the administrative district of Gmina Mogilany, within Kraków County, Lesser Poland Voivodeship, in southern Poland.
