= Mogilany =

- Town
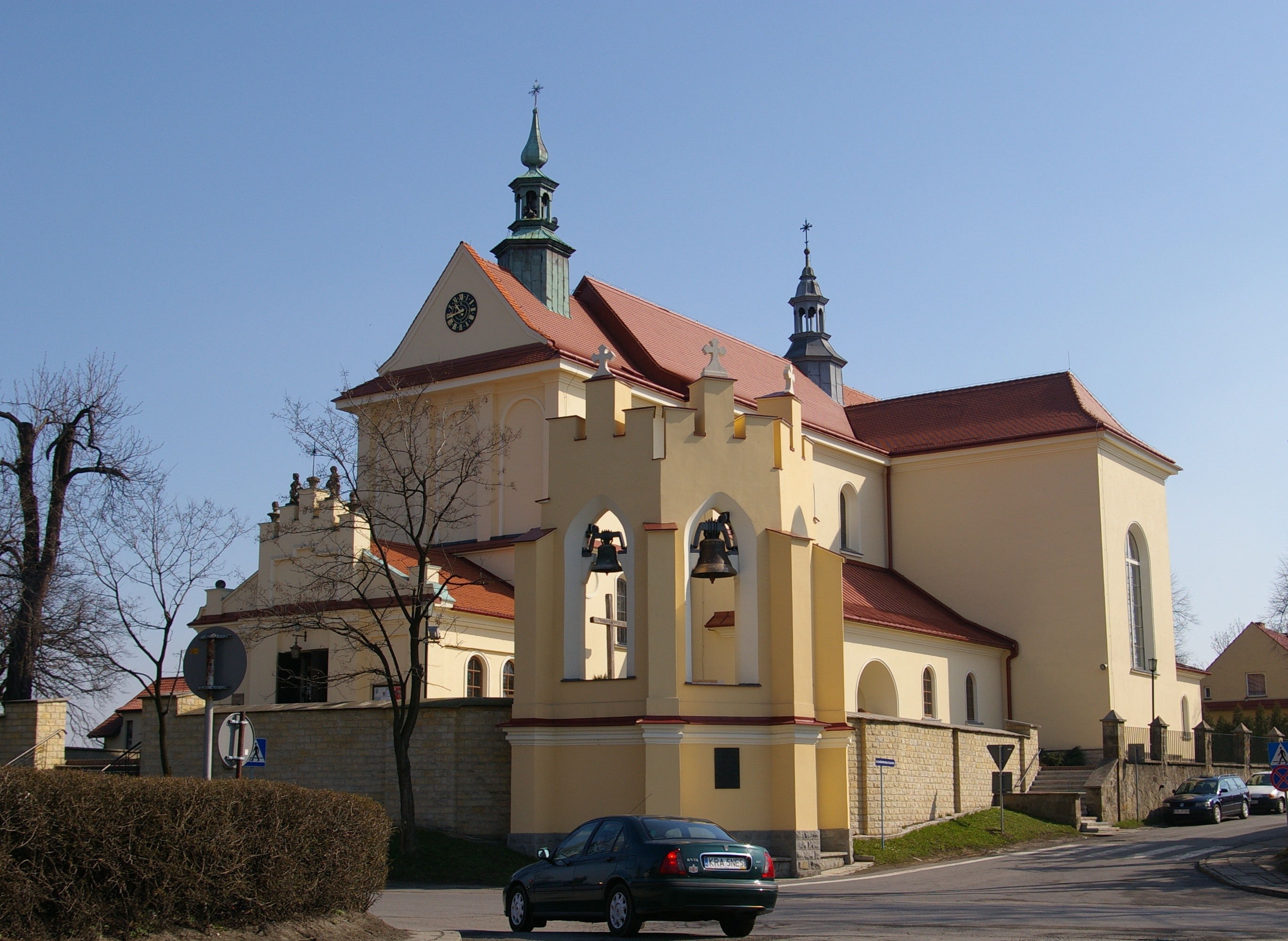
- Saint Bartholomew Church

- Coat of arms

- Location within Poland
- Coordinates: 49°56′18″N 19°53′31″E
- Country: Poland
- Voivodeship: Lesser Poland
- County: Kraków
- Gmina: Mogilany
- Population: 16,243

Mogilany [mɔɡiˈlanɨ] is a town in Kraków County, Lesser Poland Voivodeship, in southern Poland. It is the seat of the municipality (administrative district) called Gmina Mogilany.
