= Pożarzysko =

- Village
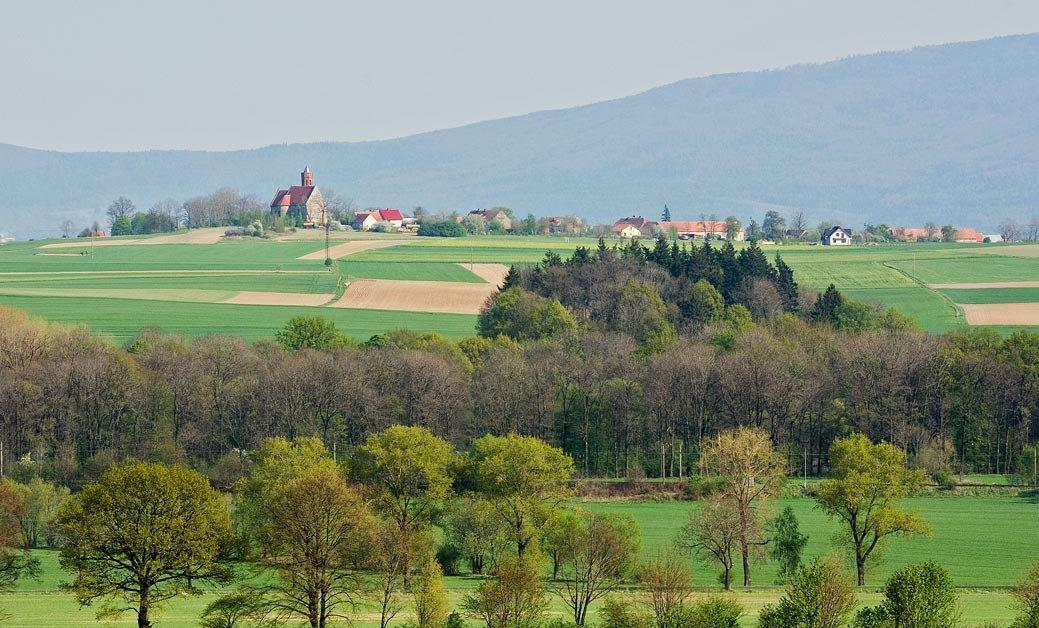
- Pożarzysko seen from the west

- Location within Poland
- Coordinates: 50°57′N 16°33′E
- Country: Poland
- Voivodeship: Lower Silesian
- County: Świdnica
- Gmina: Żarów

Pożarzysko [pɔʐaˈʐɨskɔ] is a village in the administrative district of Gmina Żarów, within Świdnica County, Lower Silesian Voivodeship, in south-western Poland.
