= Lusina, Lesser Poland Voivodeship =

Lusina
- Village
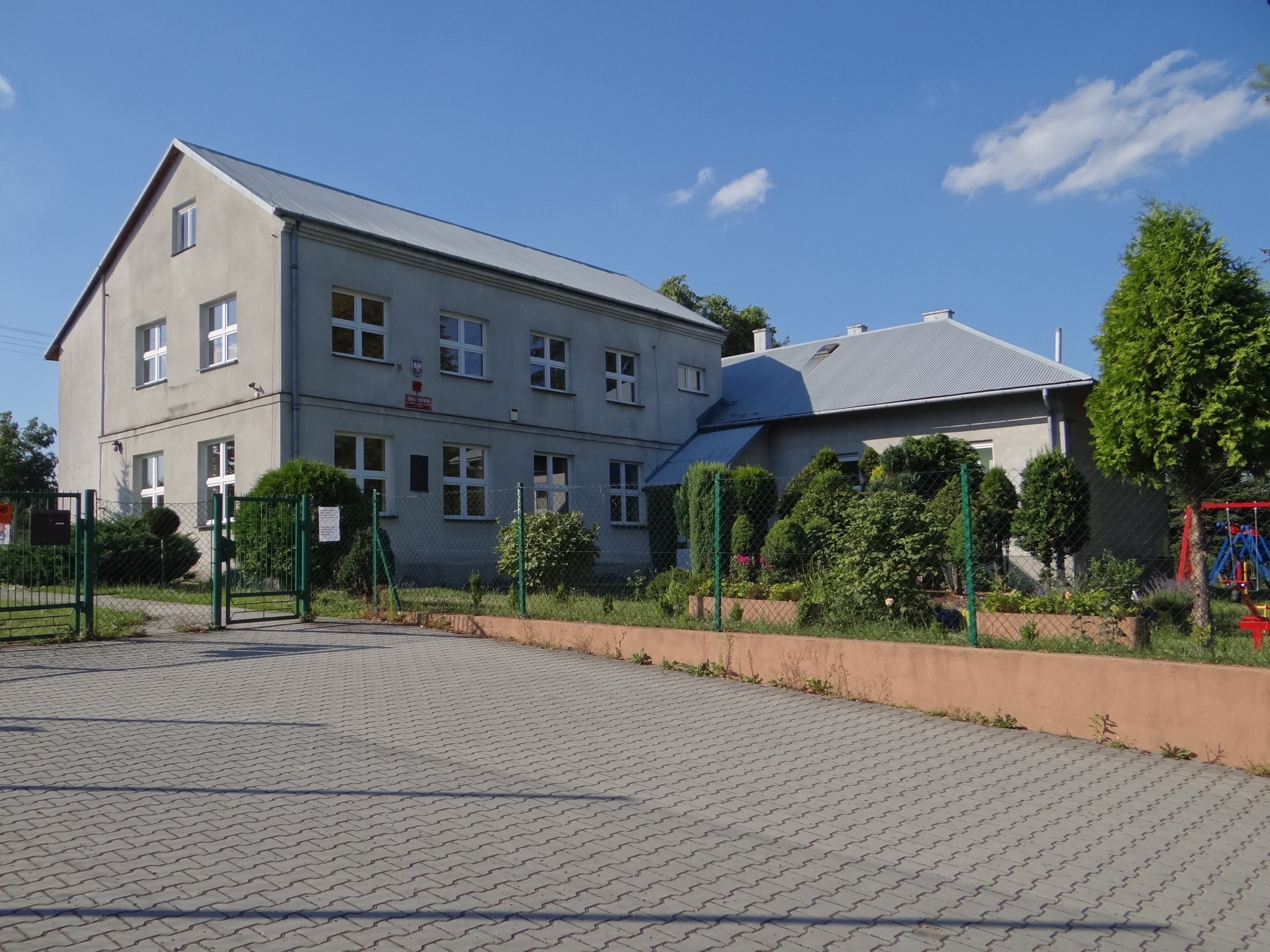
- School

- Location within Poland
- Coordinates: 49°58′N 19°56′E
- Country: Poland
- Voivodeship: Lesser Poland
- County: Kraków
- Gmina: Mogilany

Lusina [luˈɕina] is a village in the administrative district of Gmina Mogilany, within Kraków County, Lesser Poland Voivodeship, in southern Poland.

== Education ==
- International School of Kraków is in Lusina.
