= International School of Kraków =

International School of Krakow
- Międzynarodowa Szkoła w Krakowie

Location
- St. Florian street 57; Kraków; Lusina, Małopolska Province; Poland; 49.9710200°N 19.9176600°E

Information
- Type: International
- Established: 1993
- Founder: U.S. Embassy in Poland
- Status: Not For Profit
- Director: Dr. Michael Hibbeln
- Principal: Elementary School Brett Elkei
- Principal: Secondary School Dr. Brian Germain
- Principal: Admission Director Małgorzata Gonet-Mroczka
- Grades: PK-12
- Age: 3 to 19
- Classes offered: IB
- Campus: Lusina
- Campus size: 3500 meters

The International School of Kraków (ISK) is a school in Lusina, Lesser Poland Voivodeship in southern Poland, belonging to the Polish Embassy of United States.

The ISK was established in 1993 in the heart of Kraków. The school was founded as the American International School of Kraków (AISK) then later changed its name to the International School of Kraków (ISK). In 2006, the school moved to a new campus in Lusina with funding assistance from the United States Embassy in Poland. The school belongs to the Central and Eastern European Schools Association and competes with schools throughout Central and Eastern Europe. It is accredited by the Council of International Schools and the New England Association of Schools and Colleges. Since 2012, ISK provides the IB Diploma Programme for high school students, and is one of four schools in Kraków to do so. ISK is housed on an enclosed 1.25 hectare campus in the suburb of Lusina, approximately 20 minutes from the city center. There are landscaped areas with park benches, basketball courts and a soccer field. ISK features a library, multi-purpose hall, sports facility, and computer lab; wireless Internet access is available throughout the campus.
