= Gaj, Lesser Poland Voivodeship =

Gaj
- Village
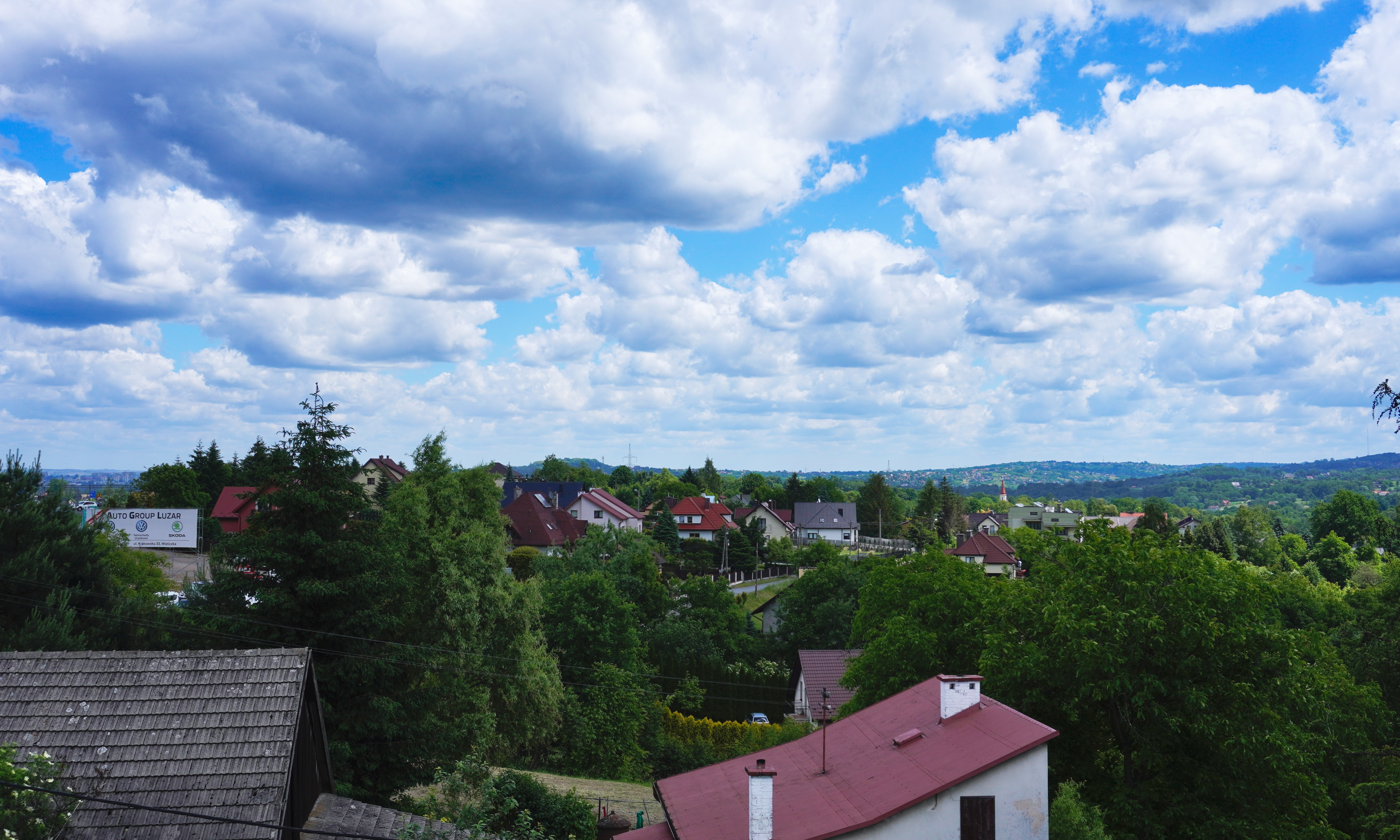

- Location within Poland
- Coordinates: 49°57′22″N 19°54′7″E
- Country: Poland
- Voivodeship: Lesser Poland
- County: Kraków
- Gmina: Mogilany
- Population: 1,400

Gaj [ɡai̯] is a village in the administrative district of Gmina Mogilany, within Kraków County, Lesser Poland Voivodeship, in southern Poland.
