= Konary, Lesser Poland Voivodeship =

Konary
- Village
- Location within Poland
- Coordinates: 49°56′39″N 19°55′20″E
- Country: Poland
- Voivodeship: Lesser Poland
- County: Kraków
- Gmina: Mogilany
- Population: 900

Konary [kɔˈnarɨ] is a village in the administrative district of Gmina Mogilany, within Kraków County, Lesser Poland Voivodeship, in southern Poland.
