= Gołaszyce =

- Village
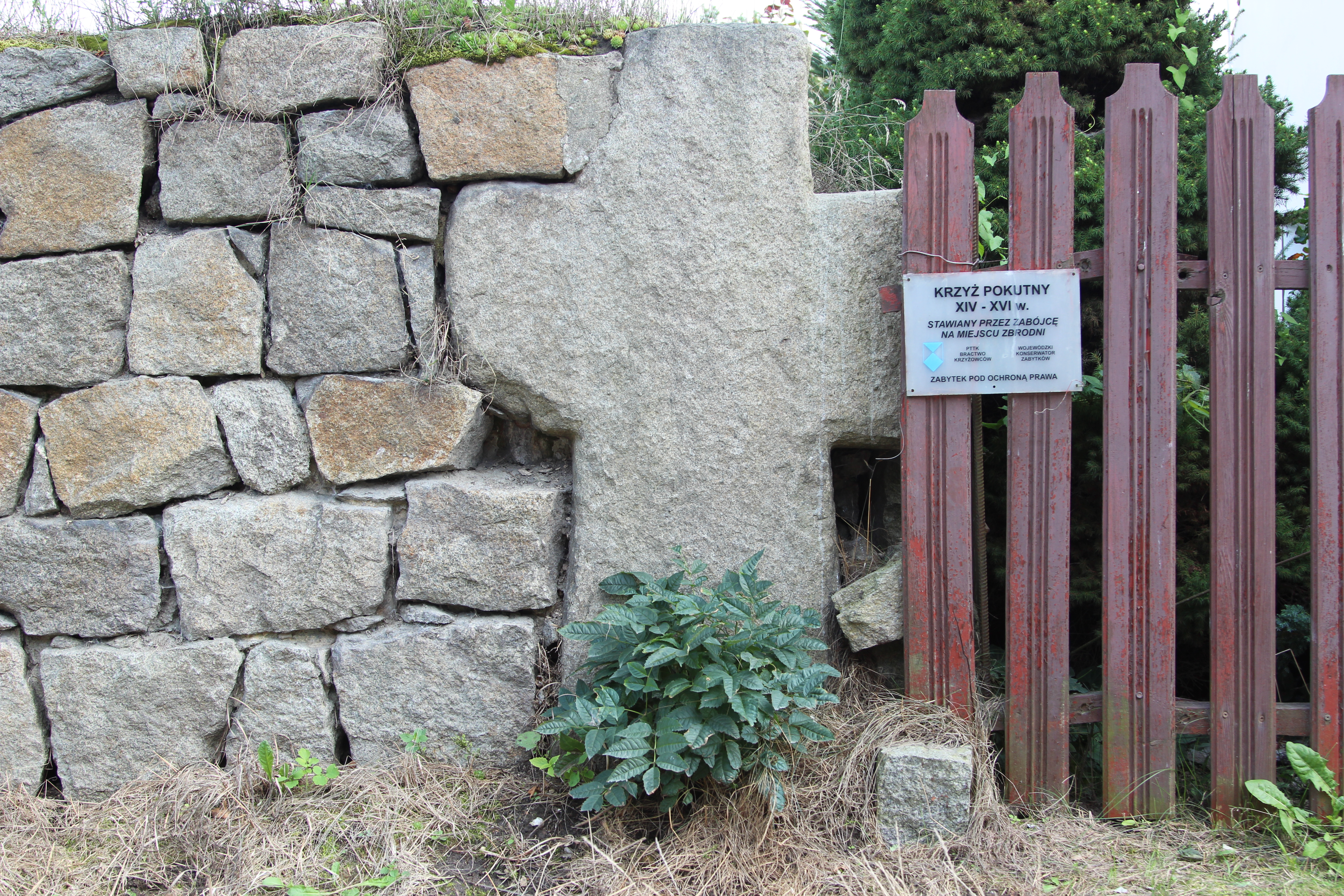
- Golaszyce stone cross 2014

- Location within Poland
- Coordinates: 50°54′58″N 16°33′45″E
- Country: Poland
- Voivodeship: Lower Silesian
- County: Świdnica
- Gmina: Żarów

Gołaszyce [ɡɔwaˈʂɨt͡sɛ] is a village in the administrative district of Gmina Żarów, within Świdnica County, Lower Silesian Voivodeship, in south-western Poland.
