= Gmina Żarów =

Gmina Żarów Żarów Commune
- Gmina
- Flag Coat of arms
- Interactive map of Gmina Żarów
- Coordinates (Żarów): 50°56′N 16°29′E
- Country: Poland
- Voivodeship: Lower Silesian
- County: Świdnica
- Seat: Żarów
- Sołectwos: Bożanów, Buków, Gołaszyce, Imbramowice, Kalno, Kruków, Łażany, Marcinowiczki, Mielęcin, Mikoszowa, Mrowiny, Pożarzysko, Przyłęgów, Pyszczyn, Siedlimowice, Wierzbna, Zastruże

Area
  - Total: 87.98 km^{2} (33.97 sq mi)

Population (2019-06-30)
  - Total: 12,412
  - Density: 141.1/km^{2} (365.4/sq mi)
  - Urban: 6,719
  - Rural: 5,693
- Time zone: UTC+1 (CET)
  - Summer (DST): UTC+2 (CEST)
- Vehicle registration: DSW
- Website: nowa.um.zarow.pl

Gmina Żarów is an urban-rural gmina (administrative district) in Świdnica County, Lower Silesian Voivodeship, in south-western Poland. Its seat is the town of Żarów, which lies approximately 11 kilometres (7 mi) north-east of Świdnica, and 45 kilometres (28 mi) south-west of the regional capital Wrocław.

The gmina covers an area of 87.98 square kilometres (34.0 sq mi), and as of 2019 its total population was 12,412.

== Neighbouring gminas ==
Gmina Żarów is bordered by the gminas of Jaworzyna Śląska, Kostomłoty, Marcinowice, Mietków, Strzegom, Świdnica and Udanin.

== Villages ==
Apart from the town of Żarów, the gmina contains the villages of Bożanów, Buków, Gołaszyce, Imbramowice, Kalno, Kruków, Łażany, Marcinowiczki, Mielęcin, Mikoszowa, Mrowiny, Pożarzysko, Przyłęgów, Pyszczyn, Siedlimowice, Wierzbna and Zastruże.

== Twin towns – sister cities ==
Gmina Żarów is twinned with:

- Lohmar, Germany
- Nymburk, Czech Republic
- Újfehértó, Hungary
