= Marcinowiczki =

- Village
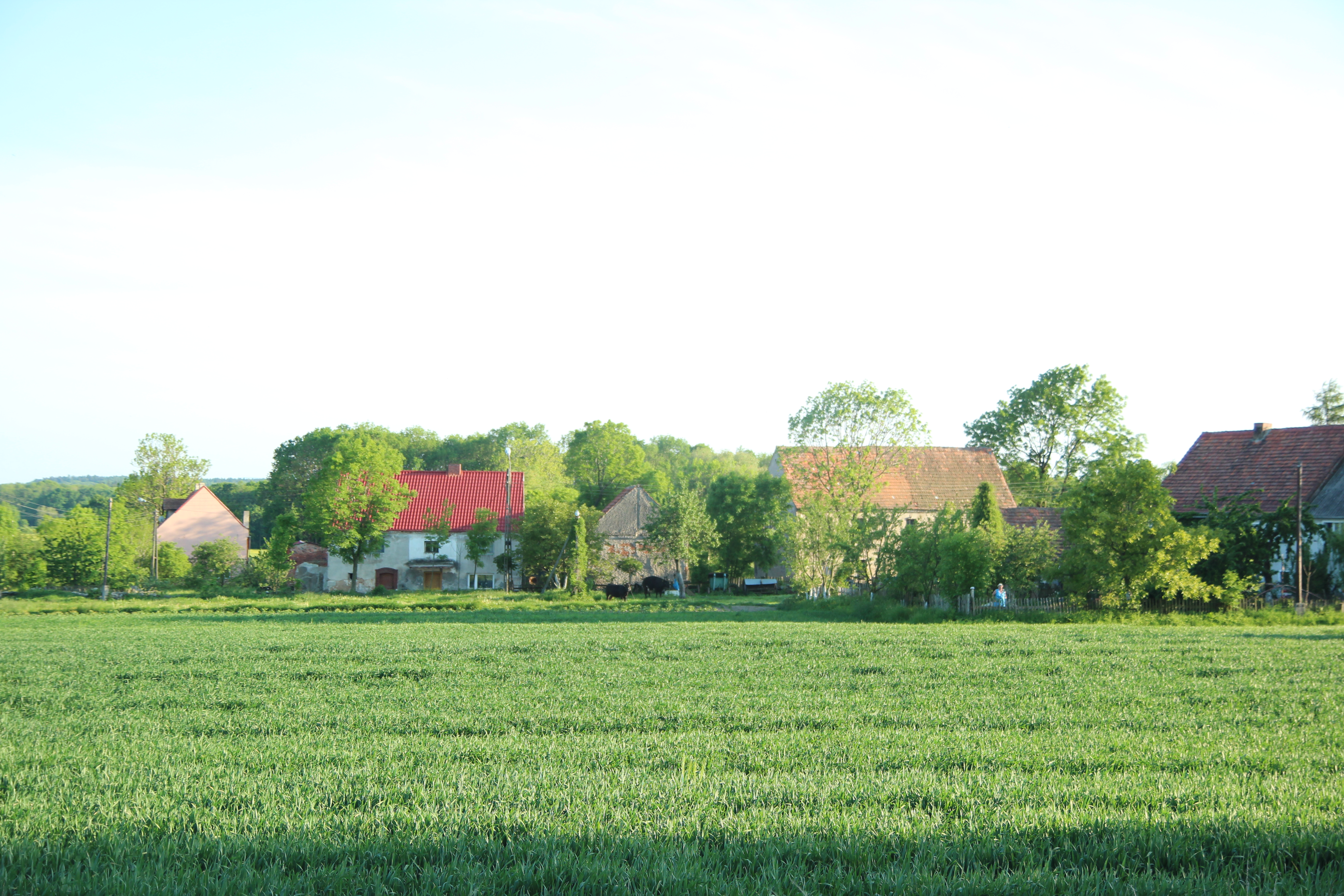

- Location within Poland
- Coordinates: 50°58′N 16°33′E
- Country: Poland
- Voivodeship: Lower Silesian
- County: Świdnica
- Gmina: Żarów

Marcinowiczki [mart͡ɕinɔˈvit͡ʂki] is a village in the administrative district of Gmina Żarów, within Świdnica County, Lower Silesian Voivodeship, in south-western Poland.
