= Bukowski (band) =

French rock band

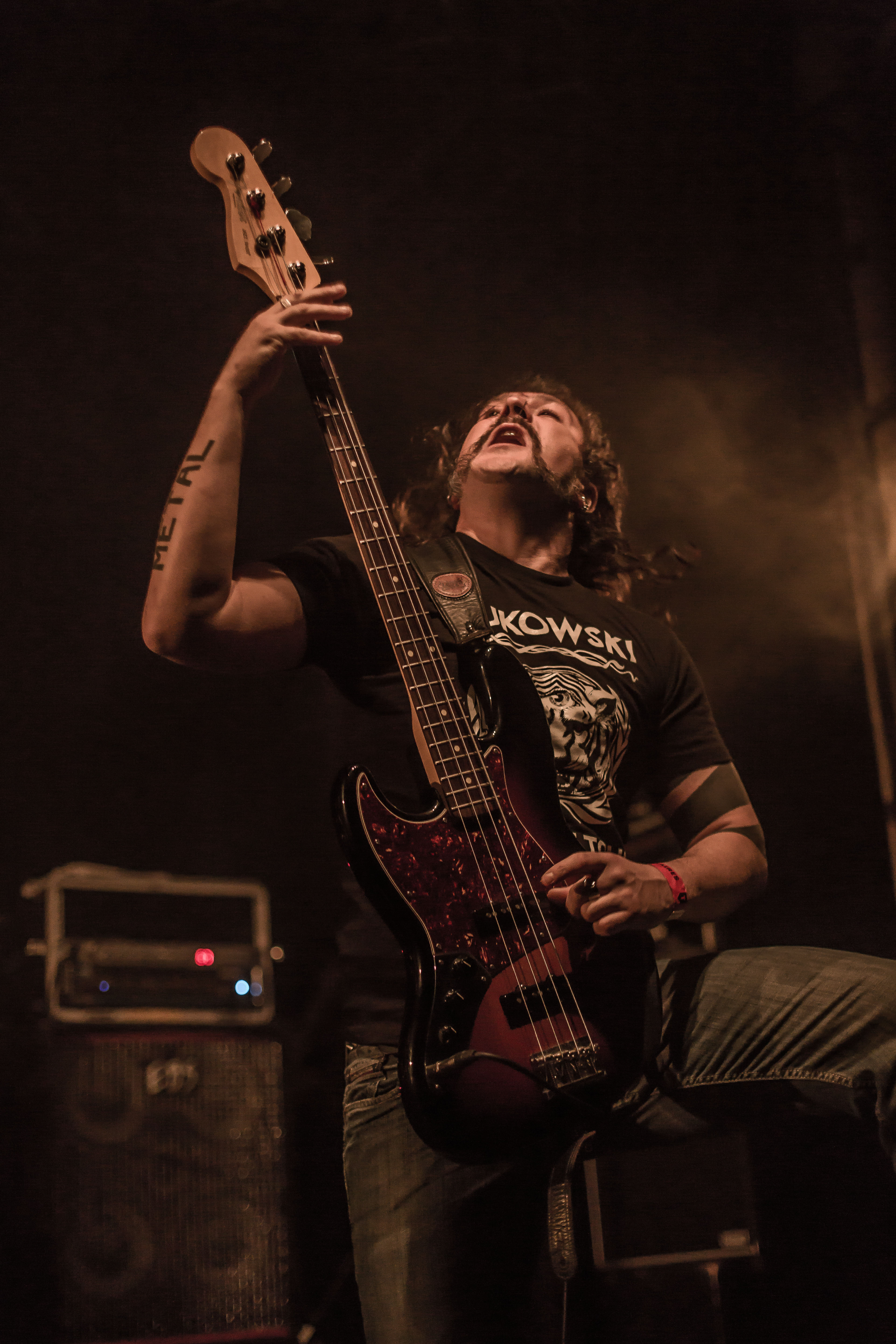

Background information
- Origin: Paris, France
- Genres: Rock, Heavy metal, Stoner rock
- Years active: 2007-present
- Labels: VeryCord
- Members: Mathieu Dottel; Thibault Morin; Fred Duquesne
- Past members: Julien Dottel; Niko Nottey

Bukowski is a French power rock band formed in Paris in 2007. It worked as a trio, before expanding into a four-member band. Bukowski has released four studio albums: Amazing Grace in 2009, The Midnight Son's, the charting Hazardous Creatures in 2013 and On The Rocks in 2015.

== Career ==
The trio band was made up of Mathieu Dottel, Niko Nottey and Julien Dottel. It came about after the split up of Wünjo where both Dottel and Nottey were members. They joined forces with Mathieu's brother Julien Dottel who used to play in band Kwamis.

With the release of the third album, a new member was added, Thibault Morin, replacing the band's original drummer Niko Nottey, who quit for personal reasons. Fred Duquesne, a guitarist in bands Empyr and Watcha also joined as a second guitarist. The band's name is a tribute to American writer Charles Bukowski.

Their debut album Amazing Grace released in 2009, was picked as one of the best albums by Rock Hard. The follow-up The Midnight Sons in 2011, was picked as "best Rock Album" by OÜI FM. The band also took part in a number of festivals in 2012.

Julien Dottel, the band's bass player, died on October 16, 2021.

== Members ==
- Mathieu Dottel – vocals, guitar (since 2007)
- Thibault Morin – drums (since 2013)
- Fred Duquesne – guitar (since 2013)

Former members

- Julien Dottel – bass, backing vocals (2007–2021; died 2021)
- Niko "Thunder" Nottey – drums (2007–2013)

== Discography ==
Year	Album	Peak positions
Year	Album	FR
2009	Amazing Grace	–
2011	The Midnight Sons	–
2013	Hazardous Creatures	115
2015	On The Rocks	–
