= Ronald Bukowski =

American oncologist and urologist

Ronald M. Bukowski is an American oncologist, urologist, and a professor of medicine who has more than 1000 peer-reviewed articles.

== Biography ==
Bukowski received his MD from Northwestern University Medical School. From 2001 to 2008 he was a chairman at the Taussig Cancer Center and then decided to retire from being one. In the past he was a fellow of the American College of Physicians and was a member of such well-known societies as both the American Society of Clinical Oncology, American Society of Hematology and the Southwest Oncology Group. His articles were published in such journals as the International Journal of Cancer and New England Journal of Medicine among others. From 2004 to 2008 he served on Oncology Drug Advisory Committee where he still works and is currently works as an emeritus staff member at the Cleveland Clinic Lerner College of Medicine at the Case Western Reserve University.
