= Bukowski Design =

Swedish toy company

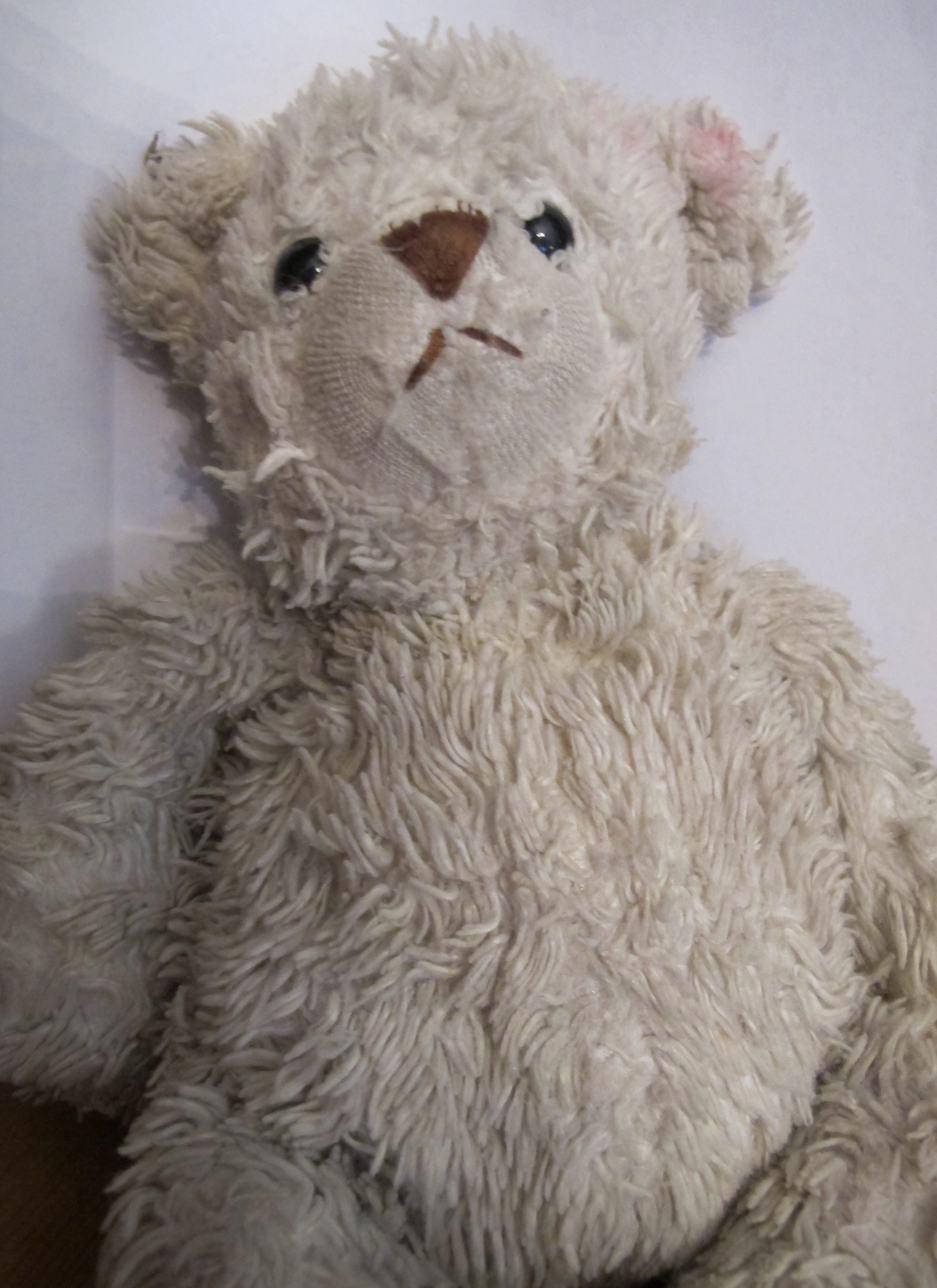
A Julia teddy bear design by Bukowski Design.

Bukowski Design AB is a Swedish company specialising in the design, manufacture, marketing and sale of teddybears and other stuffed animals as well as decorations and similar items. The company is represented in approximately 20 European countries and exhibits its products at a number of international trade fairs including Formex in Stockholm, the Tendence and Ambiente shows in the Messe Frankfurt exhibition centre in Frankfurt, and Maison et Objet in Paris. The company's business model has been analysed academically. The company for a period of 11 years made a mascot teddybear for the PR Association for Nordic Libraries.
