= Bukov (Žďár nad Sázavou District) =

- Municipality
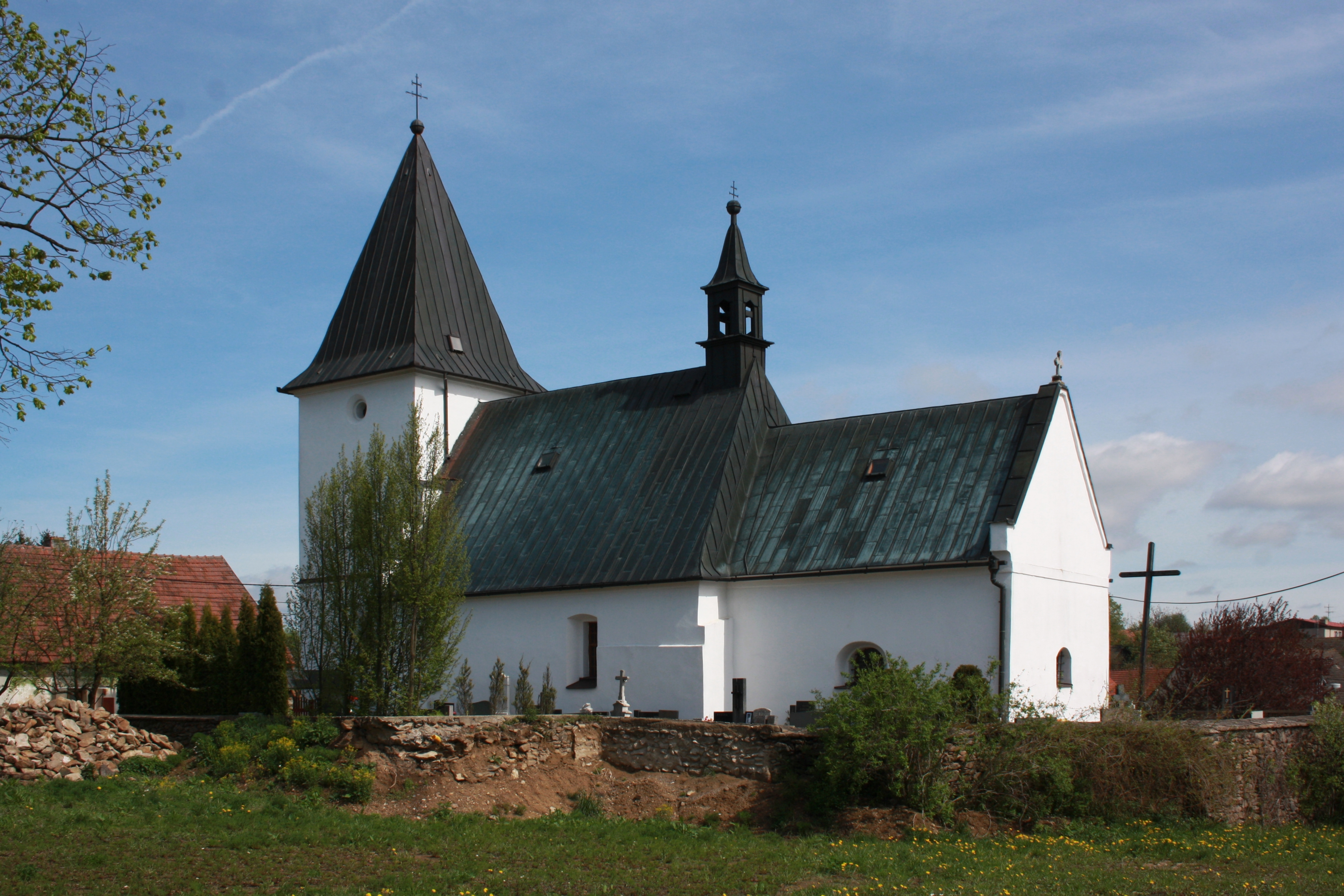
- Church of Saint James the Great

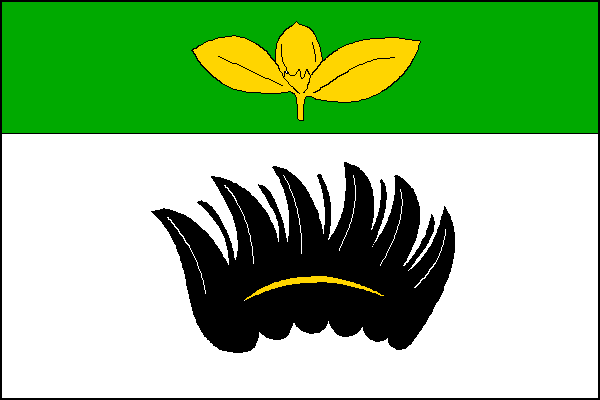
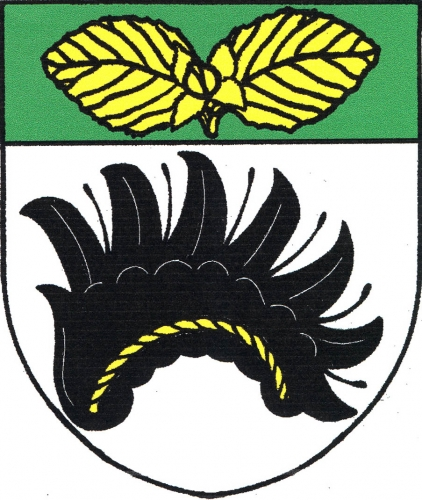
- Flag Coat of arms

- Location in the Czech Republic
- Coordinates: 49°27′16″N 16°13′25″E
- Country: Czech Republic
- Region: Vysočina
- District: Žďár nad Sázavou
- First mentioned: 1297

Area
  - Total: 5.32 km^{2} (2.05 sq mi)
- Elevation: 526 m (1,726 ft)

Population (2026-01-01)
  - Total: 180
  - Density: 34/km^{2} (88/sq mi)
- Time zone: UTC+1 (CET)
  - Summer (DST): UTC+2 (CEST)
- Postal code: 592 51
- Website: www.bukov.cz

Bukov is a municipality and village in Žďár nad Sázavou District in the Vysočina Region of the Czech Republic. It has about 200 inhabitants.

Bukov lies approximately 24 kilometres (15 mi) south-east of Žďár nad Sázavou, 47 km (29 mi) east of Jihlava, and 148 km (92 mi) south-east of Prague.

== Demographics ==
Historical population
Year	Pop.	±%
1869	326	—
1880	341	+4.6%
1890	330	−3.2%
1900	335	+1.5%
1910	331	−1.2%
1921	319	−3.6%
1930	314	−1.6%
1950	252	−19.7%
1961	228	−9.5%
1970	235	+3.1%
1980	215	−8.5%
1991	202	−6.0%
2001	190	−5.9%
2011	192	+1.1%
2021	168	−12.5%
Source: Censuses
