= Mielęcin, Lower Silesian Voivodeship =

Mielęcin
- Village
- Location within Poland
- Coordinates: 50°59′10″N 16°29′10″E
- Country: Poland
- Voivodeship: Lower Silesian
- County: Świdnica
- Gmina: Żarów

Mielęcin [mjɛˈlɛɲt͡ɕin] is a village in the administrative district of Gmina Żarów, within Świdnica County, Lower Silesian Voivodeship, in south-western Poland.
