= Buków, Lower Silesian Voivodeship =

Buków
- Village
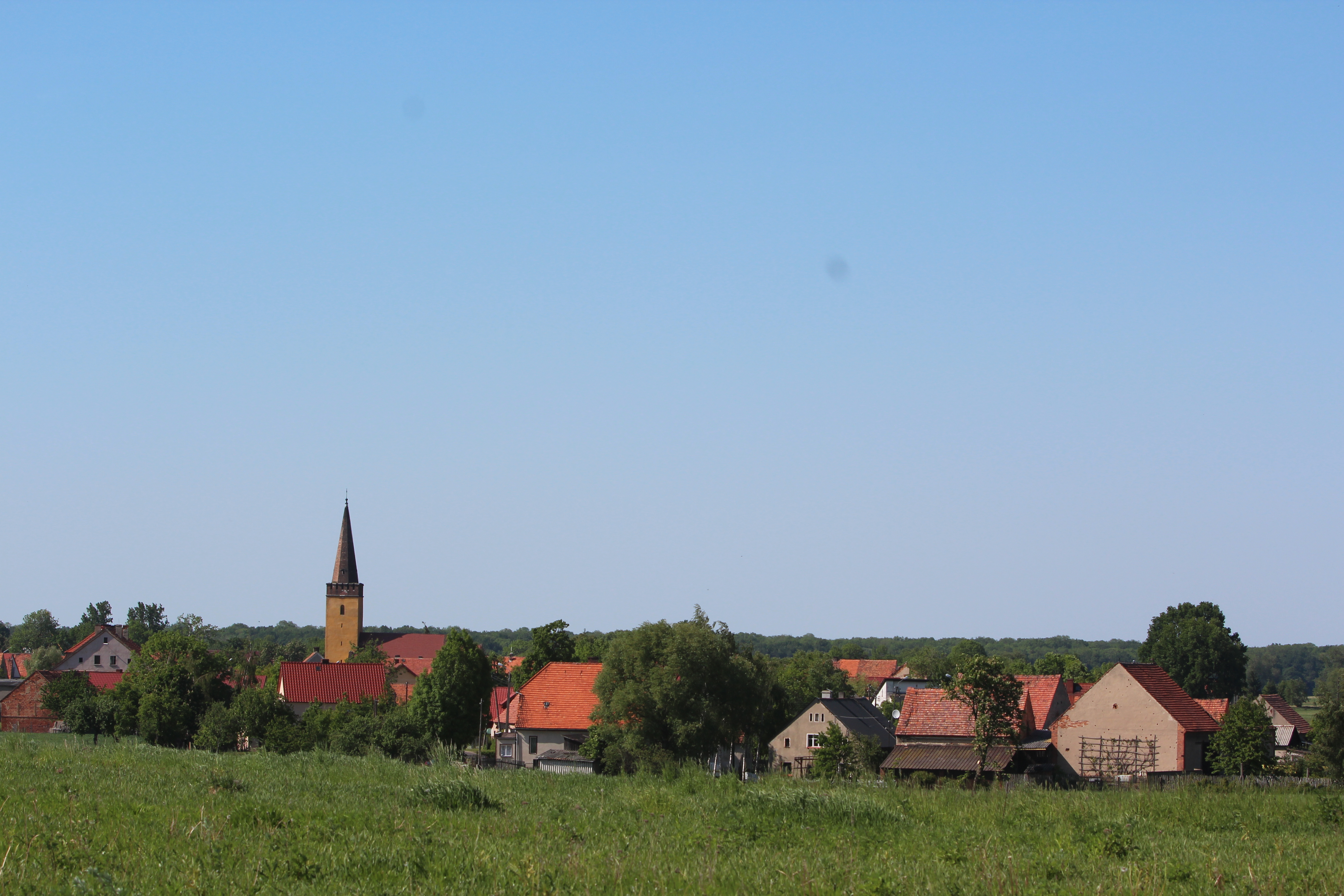

- Location within Poland
- Coordinates: 50°59′05″N 16°35′06″E
- Country: Poland
- Voivodeship: Lower Silesian
- County: Świdnica
- Gmina: Żarów

Buków is a village in the administrative district of Gmina Żarów, within Świdnica County, Lower Silesian Voivodeship, in south-western Poland.

== See also ==
History of Silesia
