= Bukowski: Born Into This =

- Directed by: John Dullaghan
- Produced by: Diane Markrow; John McCormick
- Distributed by: Magnolia Films
- Release date: January 18, 2003
- Running time: 130 minutes
- Country: United States
- Language: English
- Box office: $311,400

Bukowski: Born Into This is a 2003 American documentary film about American author Charles Bukowski.

== Reception ==
On review aggregator website Rotten Tomatoes, the film holds an approval rating of 85% based on 50 reviews, with an average rating of 7.3/10. The website's consensus reads: "A thoroughly engrossing documentary examining the life of talented but troubled writer Charles Bukowski." On Metacritic, the film holds a rating of 77 out of 100, based on 25 critics, indicating "generally favorable reviews".
