= Bukač =

Bukač may refer to:

- Luděk Bukač
- Radek Bukač
- Fanfrnoch, also known as bukač
