= Formex =

Swedish interior design exhibition and trade fair

Formex is a biannual Swedish trade fair and is the largest interior design exhibition for Nordic design. As of 2012 the fair attracts 850 exhibitors, 25,000 visitors and over 850 media personnel. The fair is currently held at Stockholmsmässan exhibition centre in Stockholm which organises some 60 exhibitions and 100 congresses and events annually. It has been described as "one of the premier interior decoration sector trade shows in Sweden" and "is the largest interior design fair for Nordic design." It will next be held August 27-29, 2024.
