= Buków, Lesser Poland Voivodeship =

Buków
- Village
- Location within Poland
- Coordinates: 49°57′N 19°51′E
- Country: Poland
- Voivodeship: Lesser Poland
- County: Kraków
- Gmina: Mogilany

Buków [ˈbukuf] is a village in the administrative district of Gmina Mogilany, within Kraków County, Lesser Poland Voivodeship, in southern Poland.
