= Bukowskis =

Scandinavian fine art and antique auction house

- Industry: Auctioneering
- Founded: Stockholm, Sweden (1870)
- Founder: Henryk Bukowski
- Website: http://www.bukowskis.com/

Bukowskis is a Nordic fine art and antique auction house established in 1870 by the Lithuanian nobleman Henryk Bukowski in Stockholm, Sweden. In 1979, an office was opened in Helsinki, Finland. In 1991, Göran Gustafsson Kapital AB bought Bukowskis. The auction firm was sold 16 years later to the Lundin family in 2007.

The first major sale took place in 1873 and included one of King Karl XV's collections. One of the auction house's most spectacular auctions in the early 20th century was held after the great collector Christian Hammer, when parts of his collection were sold in five auctions.

In January 2022, Bukowskis was acquired by Bonhams for an undisclosed sum.

== History ==
Bukowskis was founded in Stockholm in 1870 by Henryk Bukowski, a Lithuanian nobleman and political émigré who had established his reputation in Sweden through his expertise in the art market and his connections with high-profile collectors and the royal family. The company quickly gained prominence, with its breakthrough in 1873 when it conducted the auction of King Karl XV's collection, a sale that created Bukowskis' status among Sweden's elite. Queen Josephine, the mother of King Charles XV, provided critical financial support in the early years, which contributed to the firm's growth and credibility.

Throughout its early decades, Bukowskis developed close relationships with Swedish royalty, the aristocracy, and influential cultural patrons, and was appointed Purveyor to the Royal Court of Sweden, a distinction that reflected its reputation for quality and trustworthiness. The company's operations were extended beyond paintings to include coins, books, and decorative arts. Bukowskis became a trusted intermediary in the dispersal of high-value collections and was well known for its role in selling royal estates, including items from Queen Dowager Josefina and Princess Eugénie.

The auction house also made significant contributions to Sweden’s cultural life through its connections with major museums and cultural institutions. The 1920s saw Bukowskis secure exclusive rights to auction the celebrated etchings of Anders Zorn.

Bukowskis has undergone several changes in ownership and leadership over its long history. After being sold by the Bukowski family at the turn of the 20th century, the company maintained continuous operations under various private owners. Notable transitions include its acquisition by Göran Gustafsson Kapital AB in 1991, the purchase by the Lundin family in 2007. In 2022, Bukowskis was acquired by Bonhams, integrating it into a global network of auction houses.
