= Skarżyce =

Skarżyce may refer to the following places in Poland:

- Skarżyce, Lower Silesian Voivodeship (south-west Poland)
- Skarżyce, Masovian Voivodeship (east-central Poland)
