= Rusko (disambiguation) =

Rusko is a municipality in Finland.

Rusko may also refer to:

== Places ==
- Rusko, Gmina Malczyce, Środa County in Lower Silesian Voivodeship (south-west Poland)
- Rusko, Świdnica County in Lower Silesian Voivodeship (south-west Poland)
- Rusko, Greater Poland Voivodeship (west-central Poland)
- Rusko, West Pomeranian Voivodeship (north-west Poland)
- Rusko, a neighborhood in Oulu, Finland
- Rusko, an industrial park in Tampere, Finland

== Other uses ==
- Rusko (musician), a Leeds-born dubstep artist
- Pavol Rusko, a Slovak politician
- Czech and Slovak word for Russia
