= Żelazów =

Żelazów may refer to the following places in Poland:

- Żelazów, Lower Silesian Voivodeship (south-west Poland)
- Żelazów, Masovian Voivodeship (east-central Poland)
