= Graniczna =

Graniczna may refer to the following places in Poland:

- Graniczna, Lower Silesian Voivodeship (south-west Poland)
- Graniczna, Lublin Voivodeship (east Poland)
- Graniczna, Pomeranian Voivodeship (north Poland)
- Graniczna, West Pomeranian Voivodeship (north-west Poland)
- Graniczna (river)
