= Modlęcin =

- Village
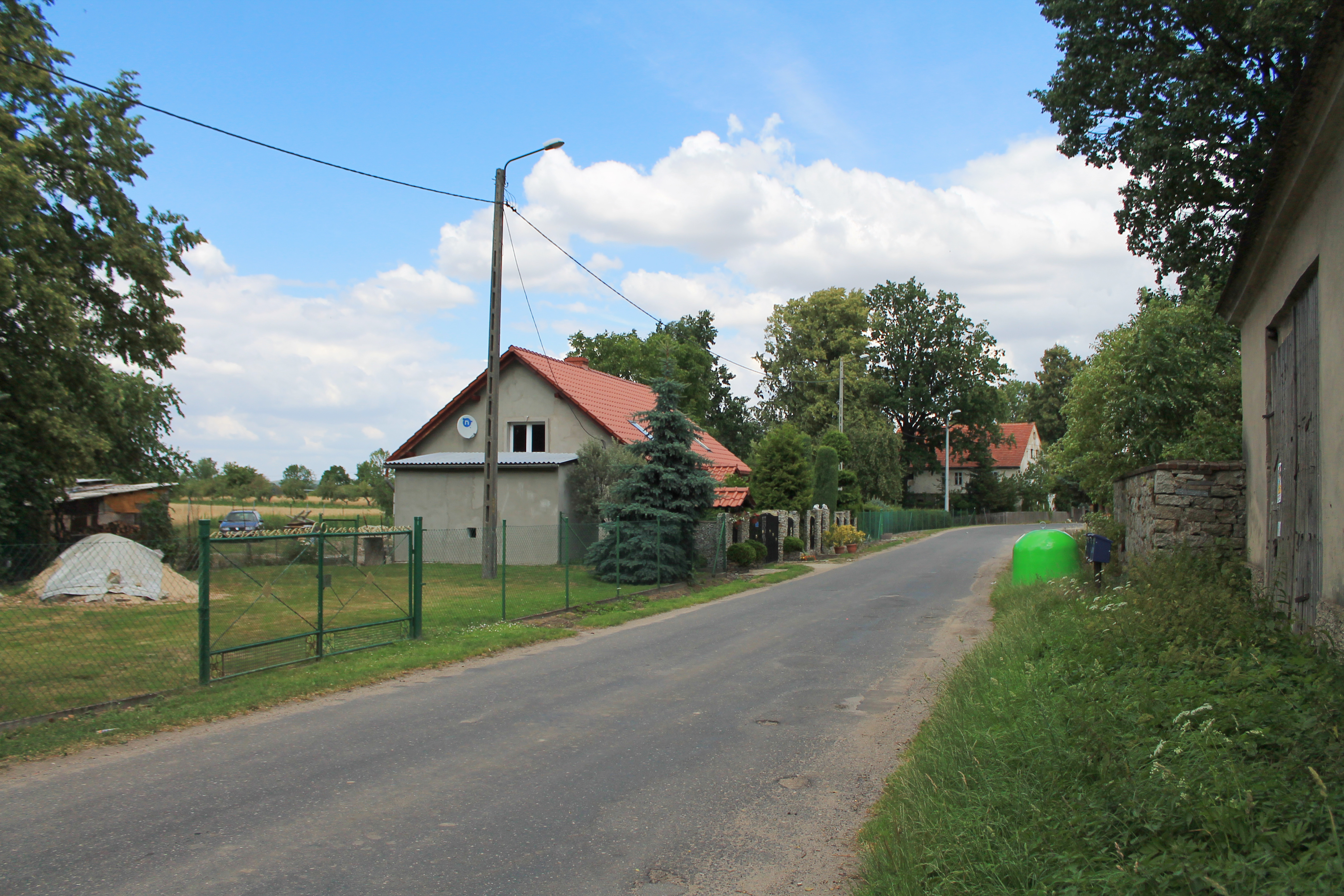

- Location within Poland
- Coordinates: 50°54′49″N 16°18′16″E
- Country: Poland
- Voivodeship: Lower Silesian
- County: Świdnica
- Gmina: Strzegom
- Elevation: 300 m (980 ft)

Population
  - Total: 321

Modlęcin [mɔdˈlɛnt͡ɕin] is a village in the administrative district of Gmina Strzegom, within Świdnica County, Lower Silesian Voivodeship, in south-western Poland.
