= Jaroszów, Lower Silesian Voivodeship =

Jaroszów
- Village
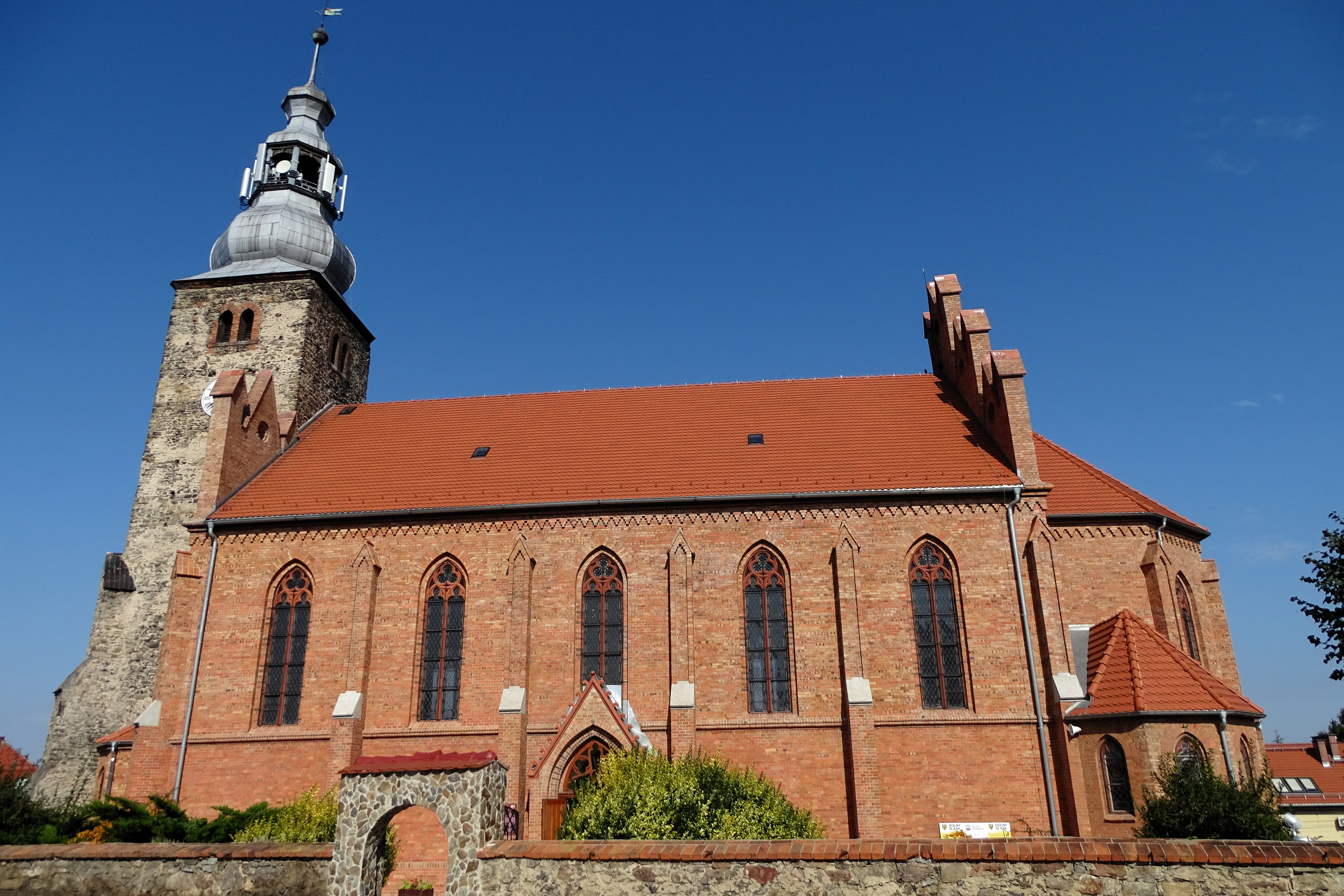
- Church of St. John the Baptist

- Location within Poland
- Coordinates: 50°59′17″N 16°25′01″E
- Country: Poland
- Voivodeship: Lower Silesian
- County: Świdnica
- Gmina: Strzegom

Population
  - Total: 2,150
- Time zone: UTC+1 (CET)
  - Summer (DST): UTC+2 (CEST)
- Vehicle registration: DSW
- Website: https://www.jaroszow.pl

Jaroszów [jaˈrɔʂuf] is a village in the administrative district of Gmina Strzegom, within Świdnica County, Lower Silesian Voivodeship, in south-western Poland.

== History ==
The village was founded by Slavic Lechitic tribes in the Early Middle Ages, and there is an archaeological site from that period in Jaroszów. The territory became part of the emerging Polish state under the Piast dynasty in the 10th century. In 1193, the tithe from Jaroszów was granted to the Canons Regular Monastery in Wrocław. The name of the village is of Polish origin and comes from the Polish given name Jarosz.

During World War II, Nazi Germany operated two forced labour subcamps of the Stalag VIII-A prisoner-of-war camp for Allied POWs in the village.
