= Grochotów =

- Village
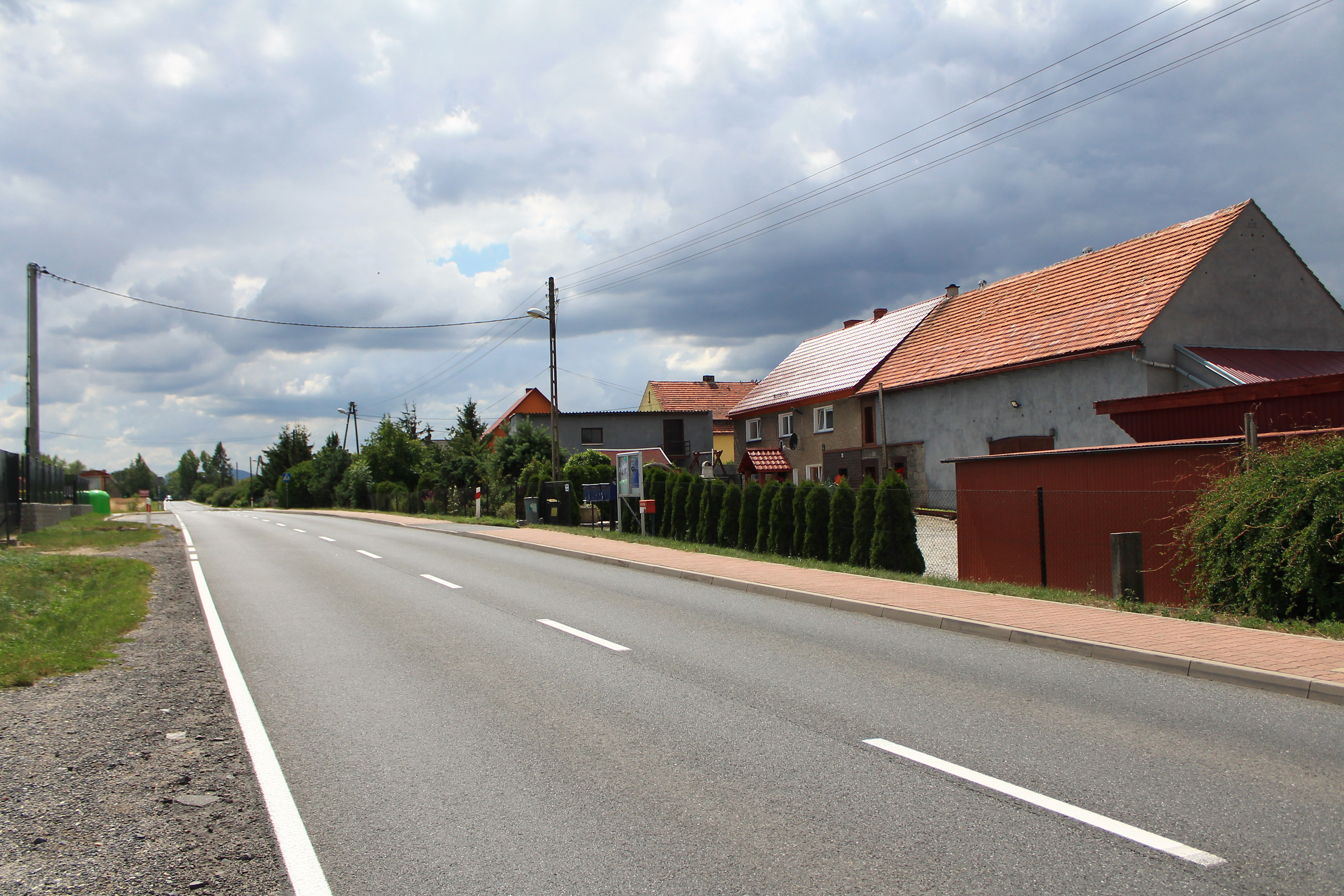
- Grochotów, gmina Strzegom, 2018-07-09

- Location within Poland
- Coordinates: 50°54′14″N 16°21′23″E
- Country: Poland
- Voivodeship: Lower Silesian
- County: Świdnica
- Gmina: Strzegom
- Elevation: 270 m (890 ft)

Grochotów [ɡrɔˈxɔtuf] is a village in the administrative district of Gmina Strzegom, within Świdnica County, Lower Silesian Voivodeship, in south-western Poland.
