= Gmina Strzegom =

Gmina Strzegom Strzegom Commune
- Gmina
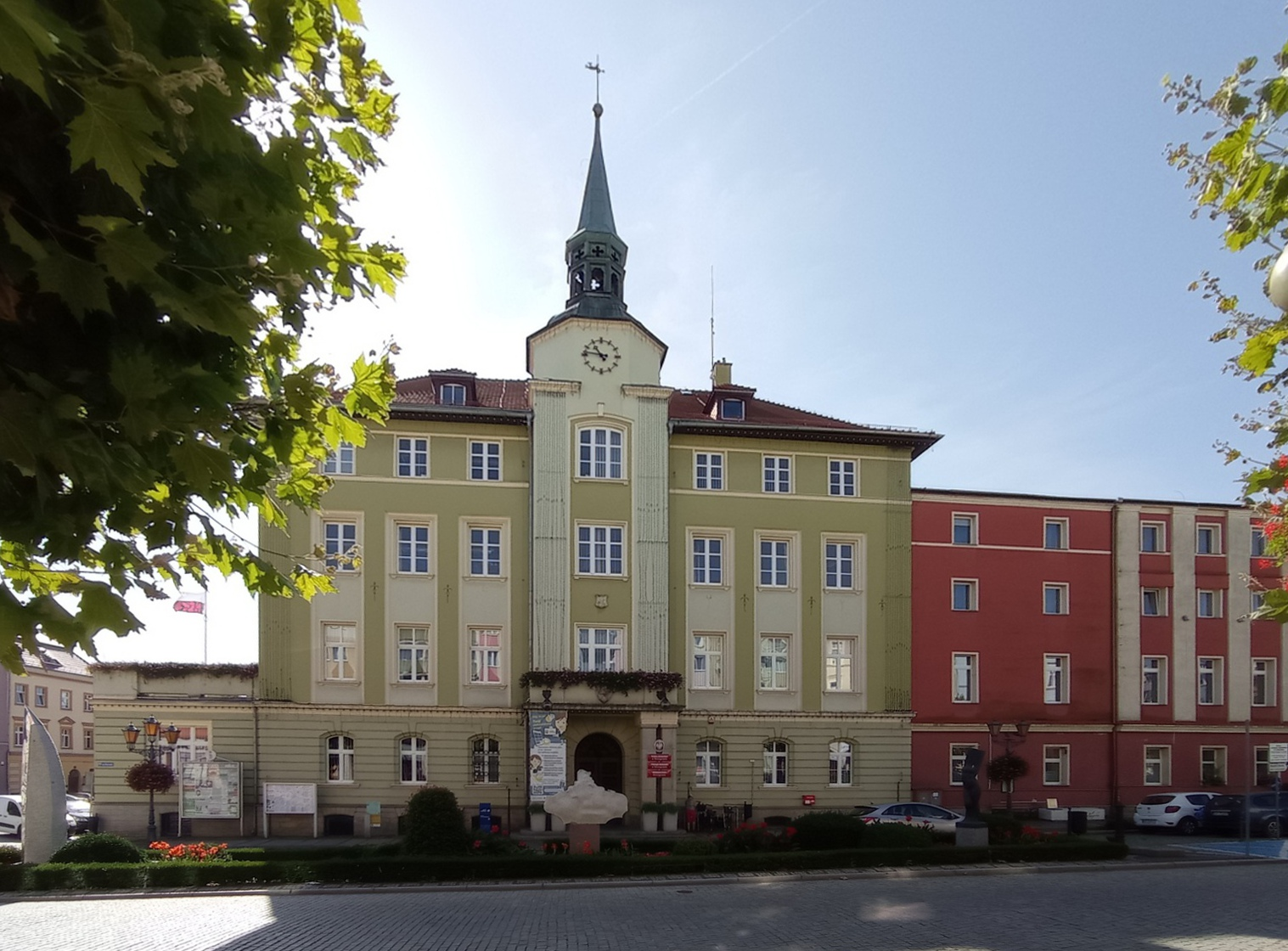
- Town Hall in Strzegom, seat of the gmina office

- Coat of arms
- Interactive map of Gmina Strzegom
- Coordinates (Strzegom): 50°57′40″N 16°20′40″E
- Country: Poland
- Voivodeship: Lower Silesian
- County: Świdnica
- Seat: Strzegom
- Sołectwos: Bartoszówek, Goczałków, Goczałków Górny, Godzieszówek, Granica, Graniczna, Grochotów, Jaroszów, Kostrza, Międzyrzecze, Modlęcin, Morawa, Olszany, Rogoźnica, Rusko, Skarżyce, Stanowice, Stawiska, Tomkowice, Wieśnica, Żelazów, Żółkiewka

Area
  - Total: 144.71 km^{2} (55.87 sq mi)

Population (2019-06-30)
  - Total: 25,775
  - Density: 178.11/km^{2} (461.32/sq mi)
  - Urban: 16,106
  - Rural: 9,669
- Time zone: UTC+1 (CET)
  - Summer (DST): UTC+2 (CEST)
- Vehicle registration: DSW
- Website: https://strzegom.pl/

Gmina Strzegom is an urban-rural gmina (administrative district) in Świdnica County, Lower Silesian Voivodeship, in south-western Poland. Its seat is the town of Strzegom, which lies approximately 15 kilometres (9 mi) north-west of Świdnica, and 52 kilometres (32 mi) west of the regional capital Wrocław.

The gmina covers an area of 144.71 square kilometres (55.9 sq mi), and as of 2019 its total population is 25,775.

== Neighbouring gminas ==
Gmina Strzegom is bordered by the town of Świebodzice the gminas of Dobromierz, Jaworzyna Śląska, Mściwojów, Udanin and Żarów.

== Villages ==
Apart from the town of Strzegom the gmina contains the villages of

- Bartoszówek
- Goczałków
- Goczałków Górny
- Godzieszówek
- Granica
- Graniczna
- Grochotów
- Jaroszów
- Kostrza
- Międzyrzecze
- Modlęcin
- Morawa
- Olszany
- Rogoźnica
- Rusko
- Skarżyce
- Stanowice
- Stawiska
- Tomkowice
- Wieśnica
- Żelazów
- Żółkiewka

== Twin towns – sister cities ==
Gmina Strzegom is twinned with:

- Auerbach, Germany
- Hořice, Czech Republic
- Pavullo nel Frignano, Italy
- Pidhaitsi, Ukraine
- Znojmo, Czech Republic
