= Rogoźnica, Lower Silesian Voivodeship =

Rogoźnica
- Village
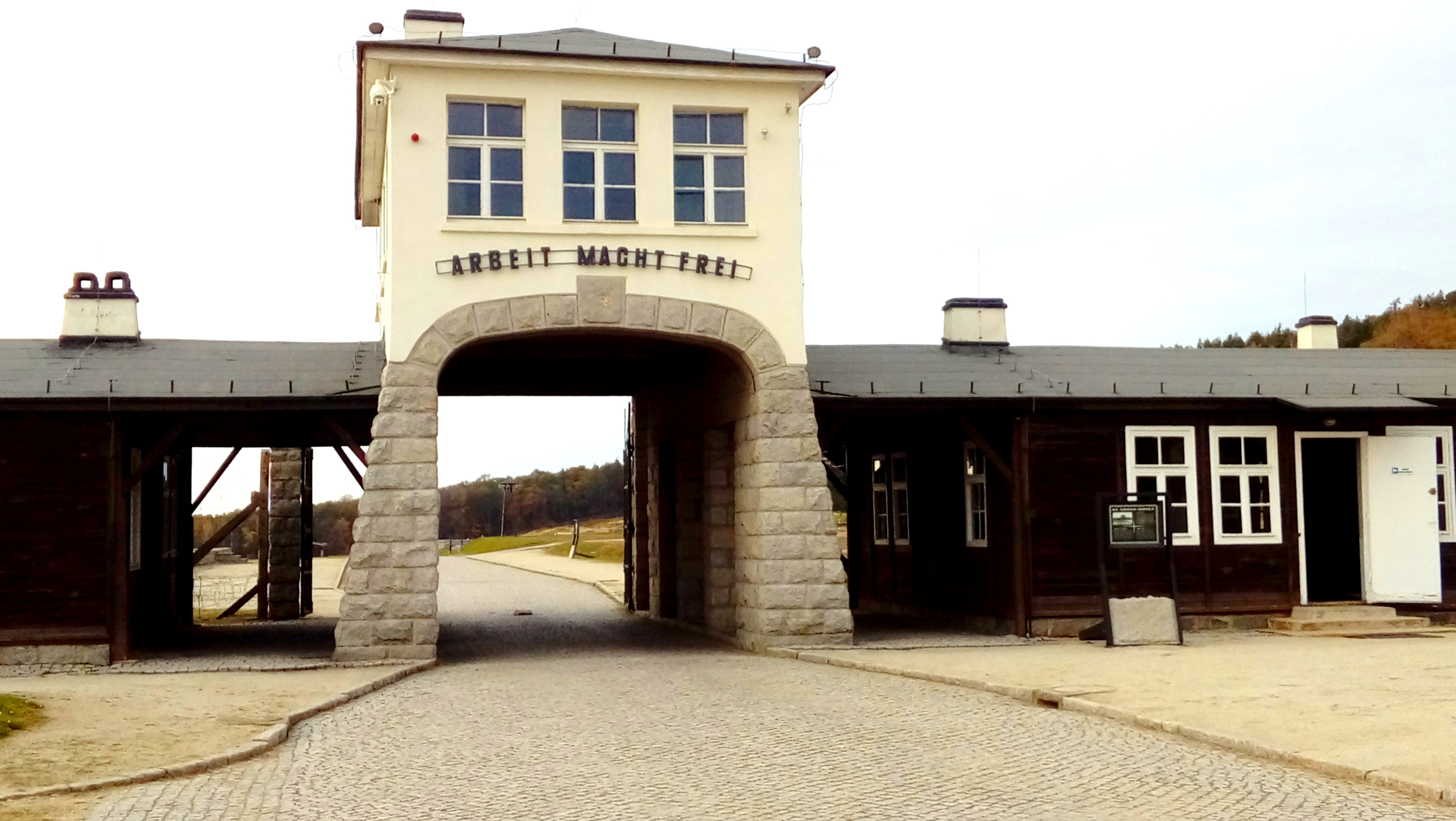
- Gross-Rosen Museum in Rogoźnica at the former Nazi German concentration camp Gross-Rosen from World War II

- Location within Poland
- Coordinates: 51°00′35″N 16°17′29″E
- Country: Poland
- Voivodeship: Lower Silesian
- County: Świdnica
- Gmina: Strzegom
- First mentioned: 1291
- Population: 856
- Time zone: UTC+1 (CET)
  - Summer (DST): UTC+2 (CEST)

Rogoźnica (Polish pronunciation: ['rɔɡɔʑˈɲit͡sa]) is a village in the administrative district of Gmina Strzegom, within Świdnica County, Lower Silesian Voivodeship, in south-western Poland.

== History ==
The oldest known mention of Rogoźnica comes from a document from 1291. It was also mentioned in the medieval Polish chronicle Liber fundationis episcopatus Vratislaviensis, created a few years later. It was part of medieval Poland ruled by the Piast dynasty. In later periods the village was also part of Bohemia, Hungary, Austria, Prussia and Germany, before being reintegrated with Poland in 1945 after the defeat of Nazi Germany in World War II.There are two historic churches in the village: the church of Simon and Jude Thaddeus and the church of Our Lady of the Rosary.

=== Gross-Rosen ===
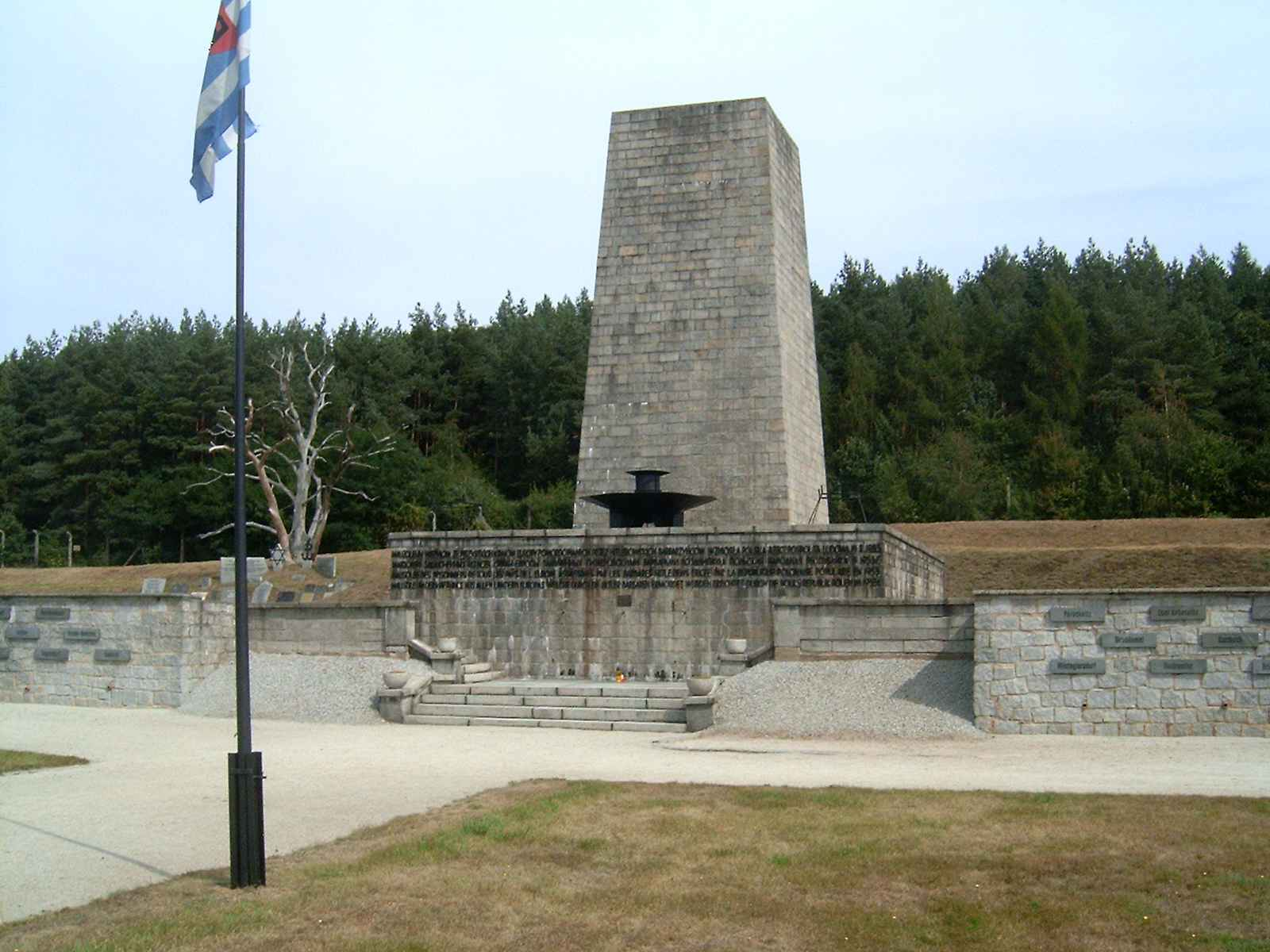
Memorial to victims

During World War II, in 1940, a forced labour subcamp of the Sachsenhausen concentration camp was established by Nazi Germany at a local granite quarry, which in the following year was converted into the Gross-Rosen concentration camp, where 40,000 prisoners perished. By 1944, the number of Gross-Rosen subcamps reached 100. The most numerous ethnic groups imprisoned in the Gross-Rosen network were Jews (from various European countries), Poles and citizens of the former Soviet Union. Nowadays the Gross-Rosen Museum in Rogoźnica is located at the site, it is a branch of the Historical Museum of Wrocław. The stone memorial to victims of the camp, containing ashes collected at the site was unveiled in 1953 and rebuilt in 1985.

== Economy ==
Rogoźnica, along with the nearby town of Strzegom and several other villages, is an important center for granite mining and stonemasonry in Poland.

== Gallery ==
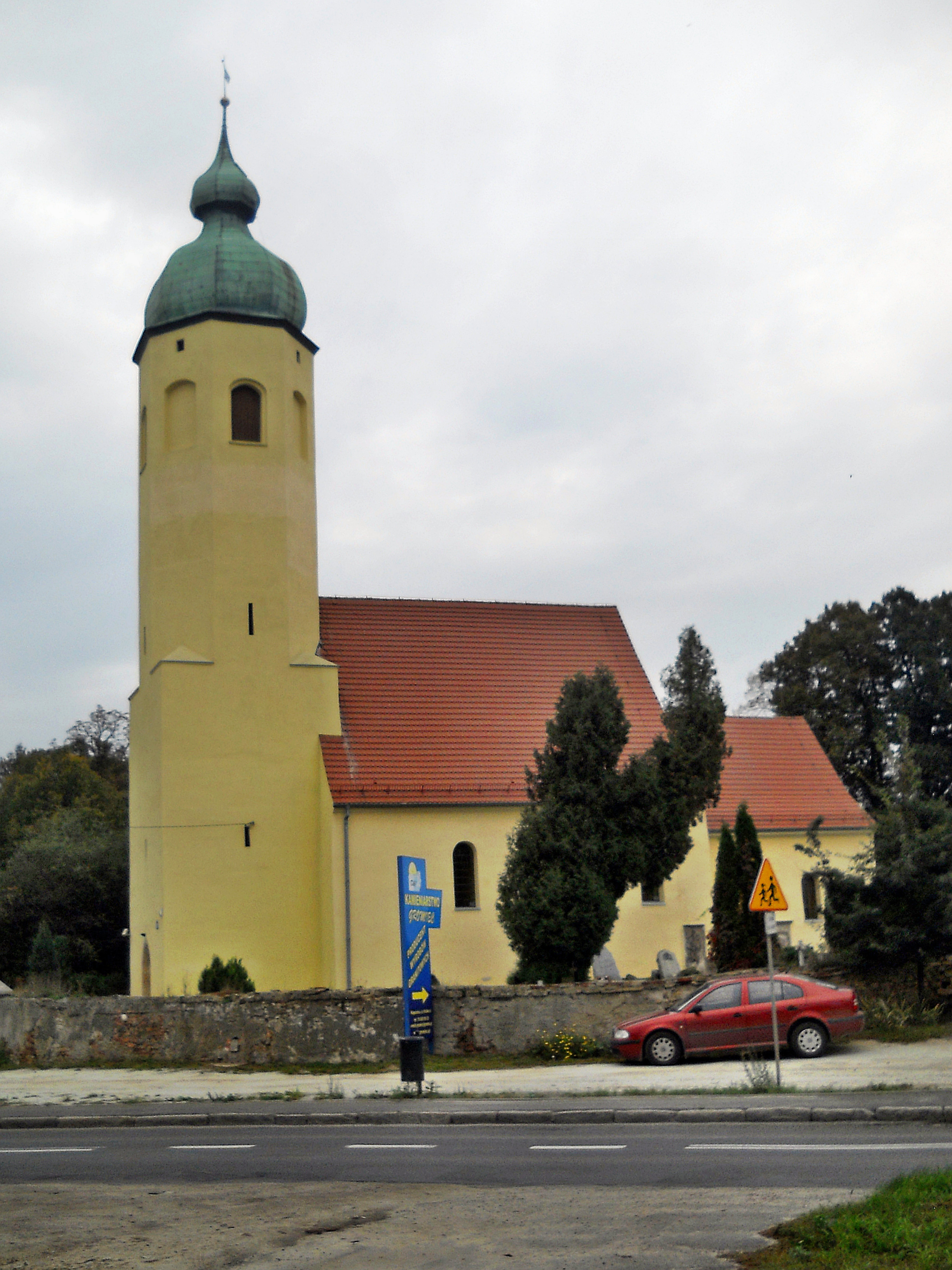
Saints Simon and Jude Thaddeus church

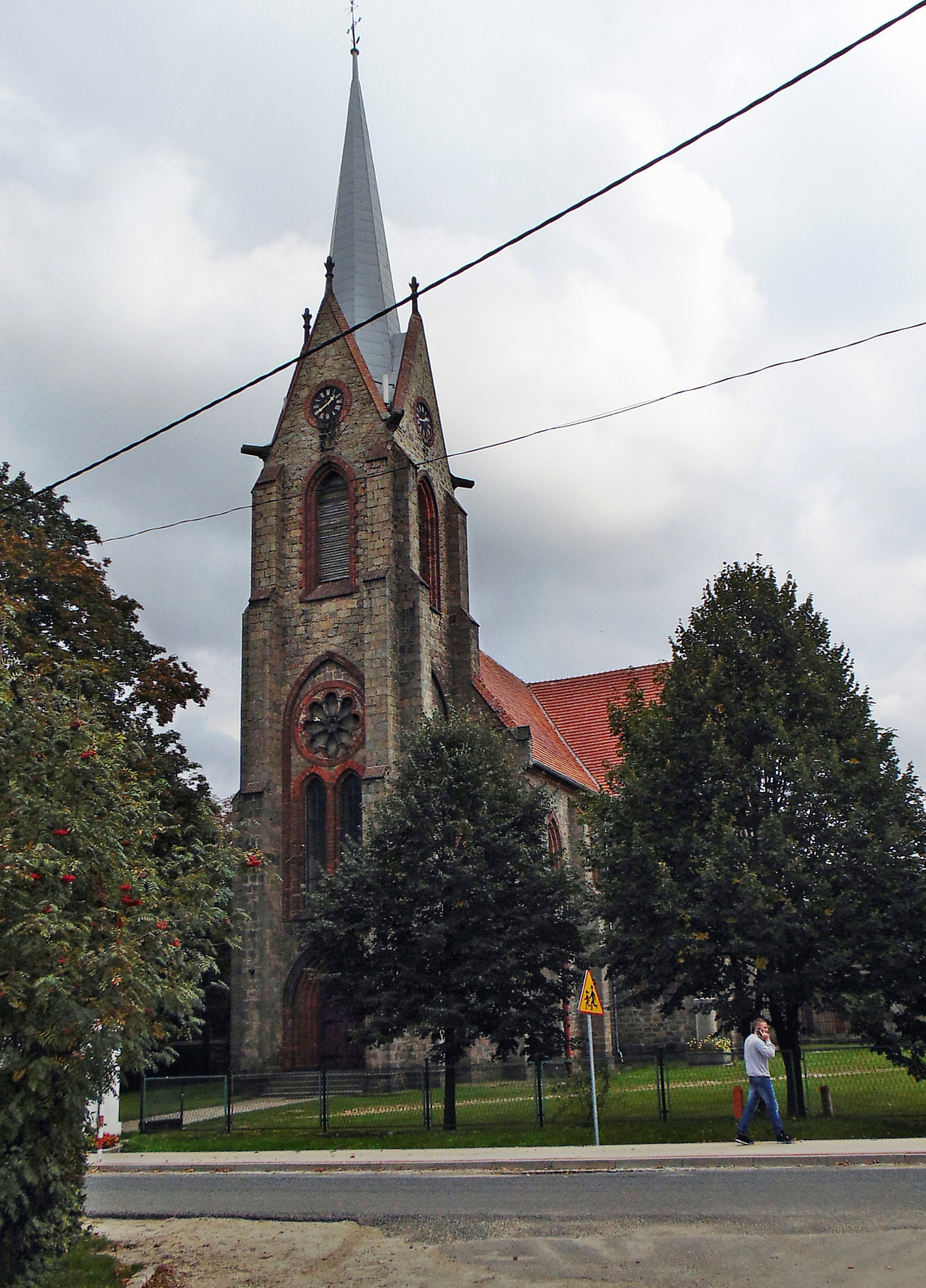
Our Lady of the Rosary church

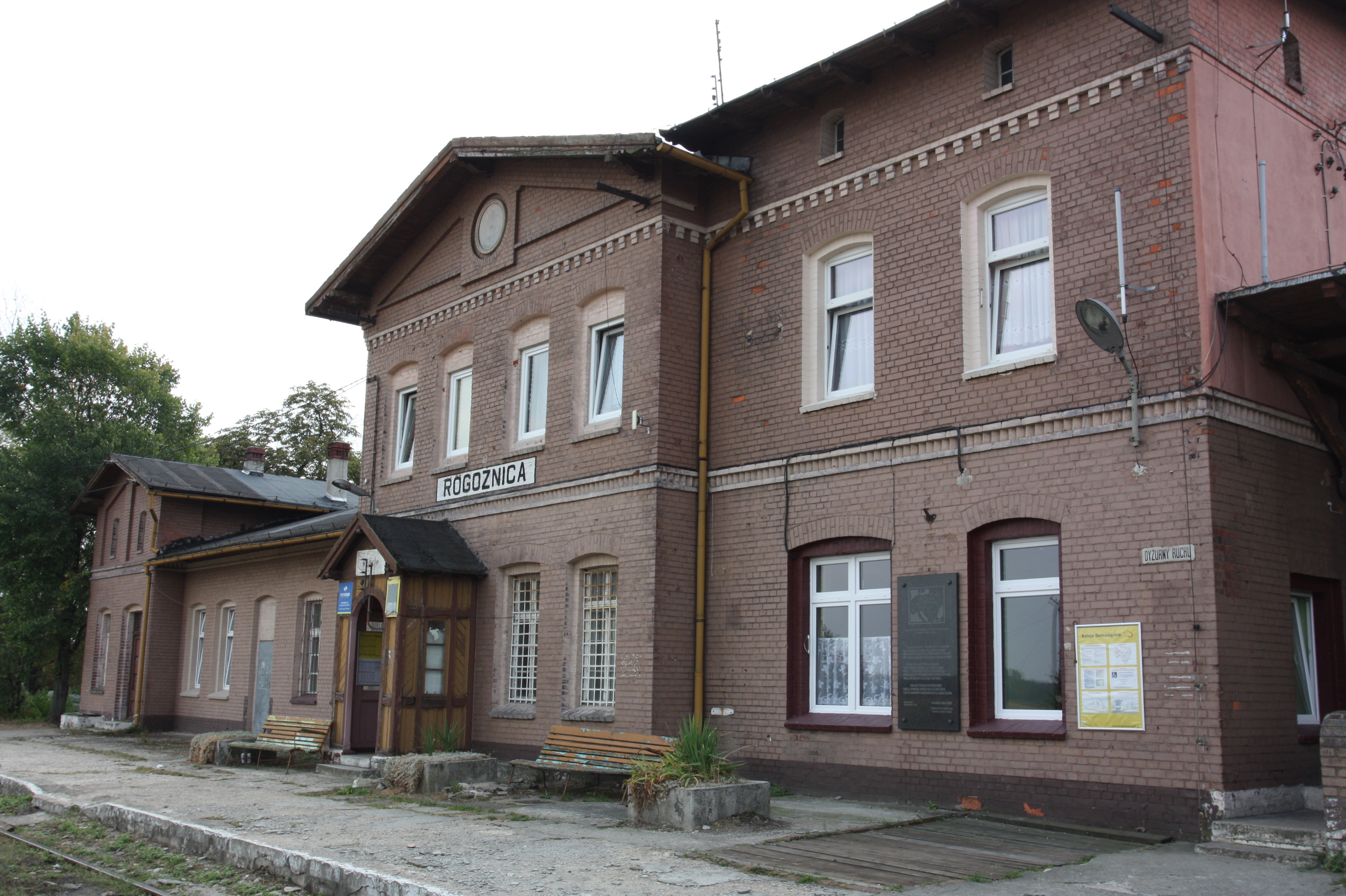
Train station

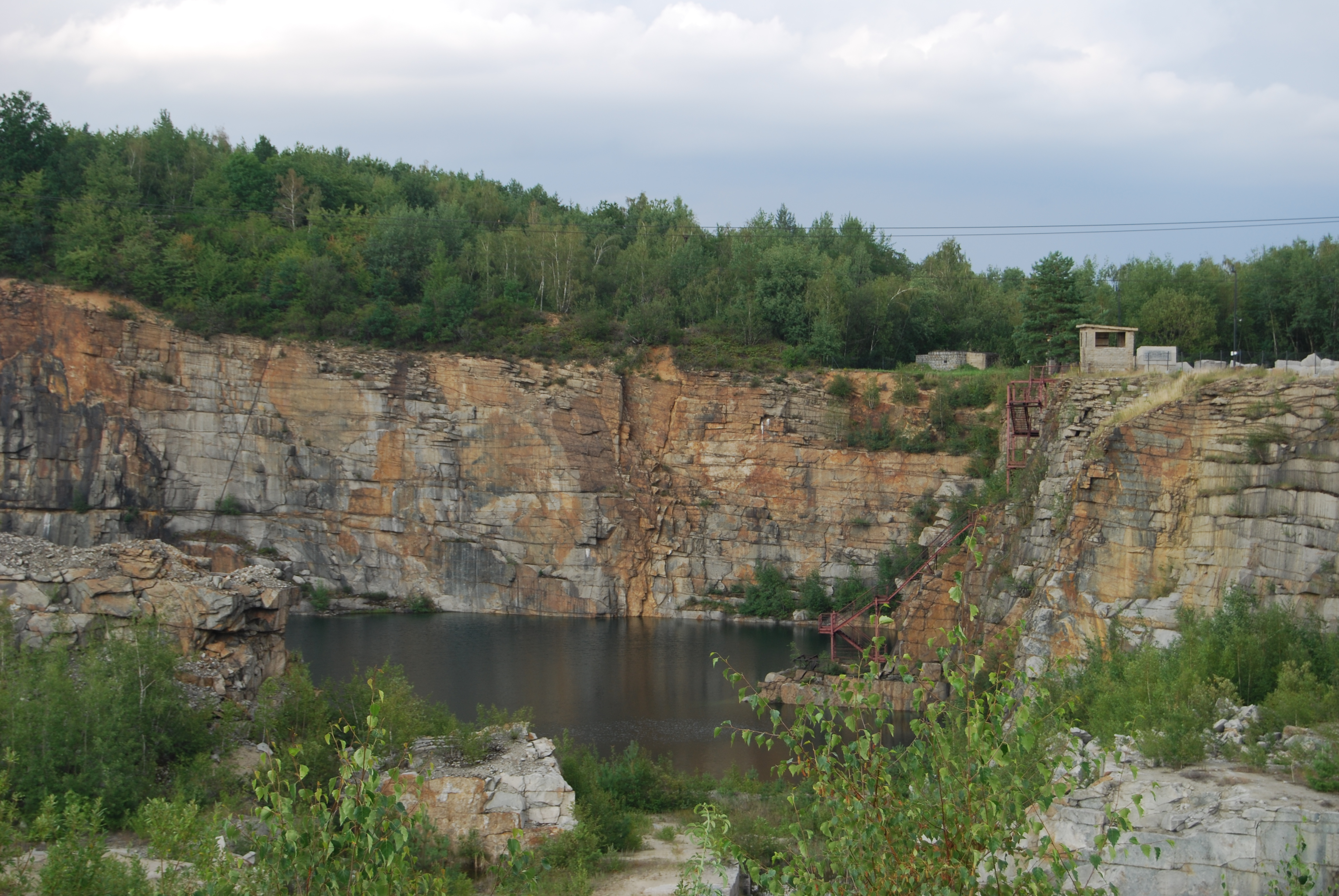
Quarry
