= Carl Wagener =

German Nazi military leader

- Born: 23 December 1901; Stanowitz, German Empire
- Died: 3 June 1988 (aged 86); Hanover, West Germany
- Military career
- Allegiance: Weimar Republic; Nazi Germany
- Branch: German Army
- Service years: 1921–1945
- Rank: Generalmajor
- Units: XXXX Panzer Corps; 1st Panzer Army; 5th Panzer Army
- Conflicts: World War II; Invasion of Poland; Battle of France; Operation Barbarossa; Battle of Stalingrad; Battle of the Caucasus; Hube's Pocket; Battle of the Bulge
- Awards: Knight's Cross of the Iron Cross

Carl Wagener (23 December 1901 – 3 June 1988) was a general in the Wehrmacht of Nazi Germany during World War II. He was a recipient of the Knight's Cross of the Iron Cross.

== Awards and decorations ==
- Knight's Cross of the Iron Cross on 14 May 1944 as Oberst i.G. and Chef der Generalstab of

Cambiar a la tabla de contenidos 1.Panzerarmee
