= Goczałków =

- Village
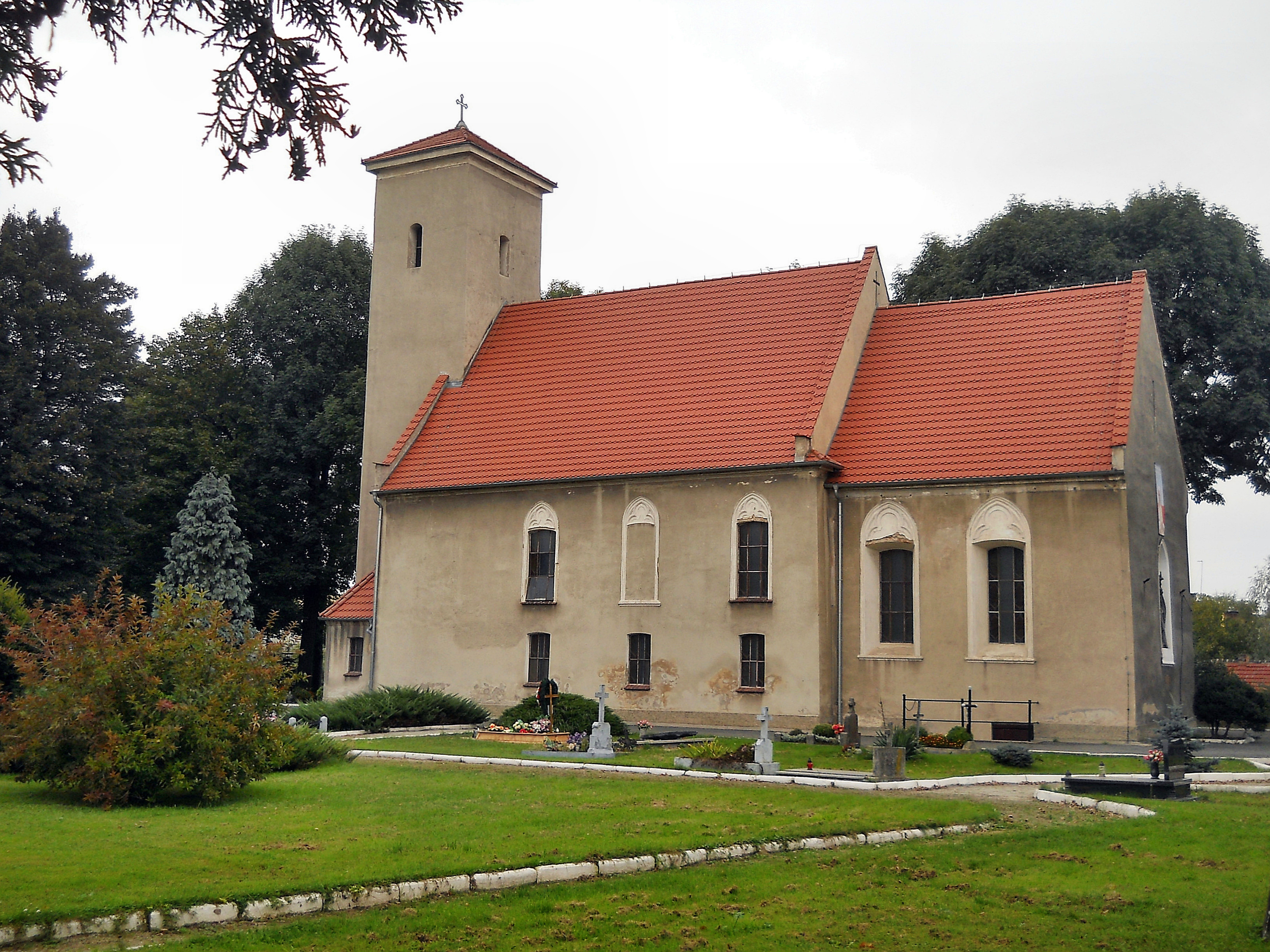
- Church in Goczałków

- Location within Poland
- Coordinates: 51°00′26″N 16°19′24″E
- Country: Poland
- Voivodeship: Lower Silesian
- County: Świdnica
- Gmina: Strzegom

Population (approx.)
  - Total: 1,500
- Time zone: UTC+1 (CET)
  - Summer (DST): UTC+2 (CEST)
- Vehicle registration: DSW

Goczałków [ɡɔˈt͡ʂau̯kuf] is a village in the administrative district of Gmina Strzegom, within Świdnica County, Lower Silesian Voivodeship, in south-western Poland.

During World War II, Nazi Germany operated two forced labour subcamps of the Stalag VIII-A prisoner-of-war camp for Allied POWs in the village.

== Economy ==
Goczałków, along with the nearby town of Strzegom and several other villages, is an important center for granite mining and stonemasonry in Poland.
