= Wieśnica =

- Village
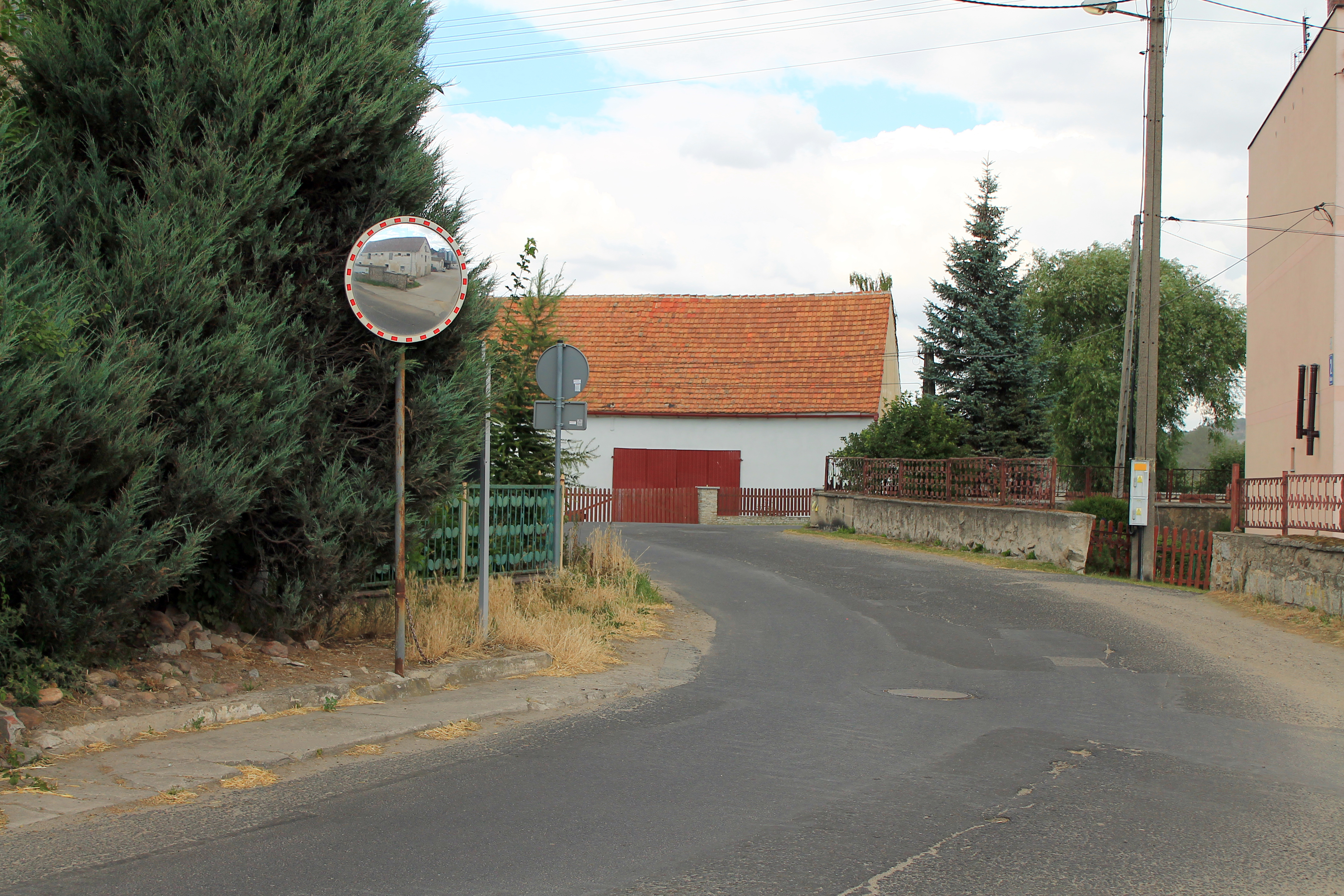

- Location within Poland
- Coordinates: 50°59′N 16°20′E
- Country: Poland
- Voivodeship: Lower Silesian
- County: Świdnica
- Gmina: Strzegom

Wieśnica [vjɛɕˈnit͡sa] is a village in the administrative district of Gmina Strzegom, within Świdnica County, Lower Silesian Voivodeship, in south-western Poland.
