= Żółkiewka =

- Village
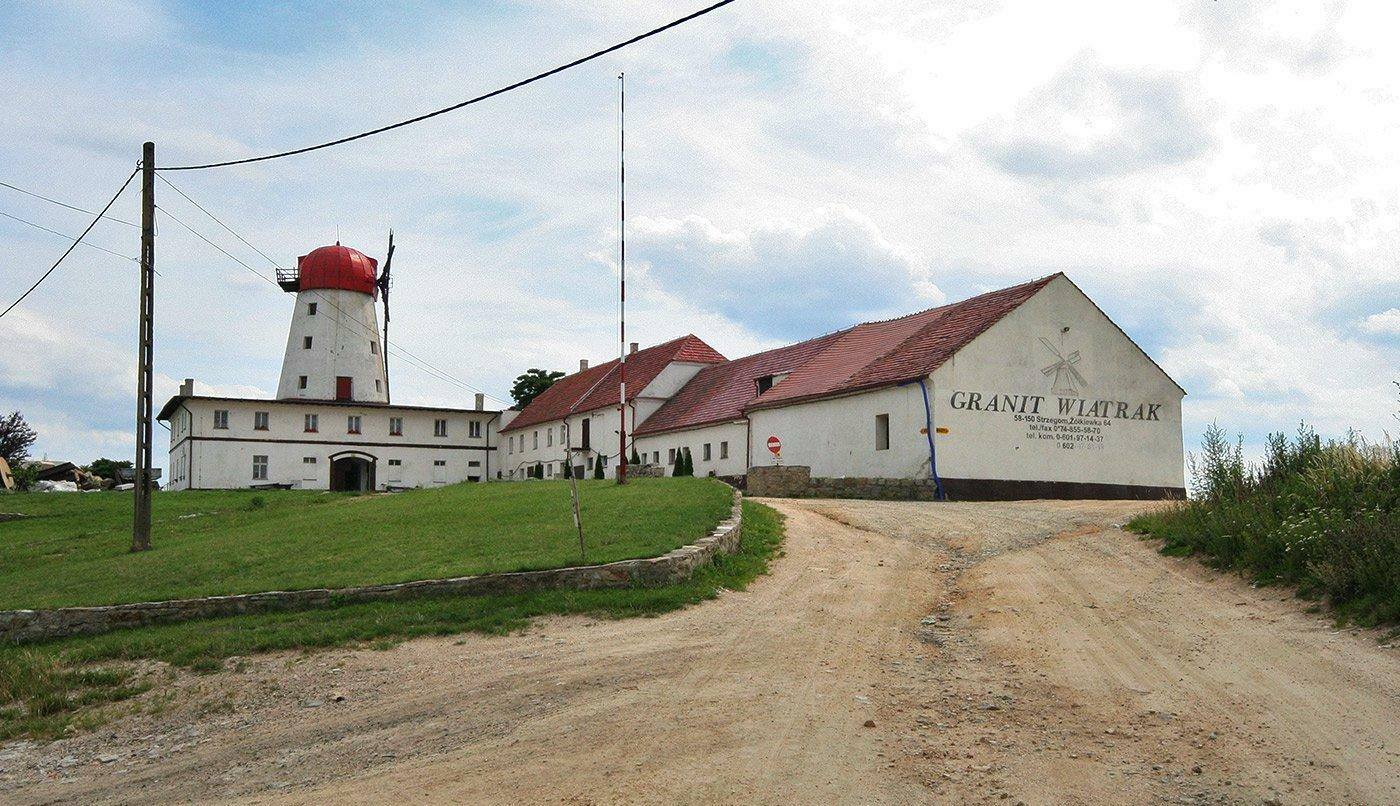
- Żółkiewka wind mill

- Location within Poland
- Coordinates: 50°58′38″N 16°18′20″E
- Country: Poland
- Voivodeship: Lower Silesian
- County: Świdnica
- Gmina: Strzegom
- Time zone: UTC+1 (CET)
  - Summer (DST): UTC+2 (CEST)
- Vehicle registration: DSW

Żółkiewka [ʐuu̯ˈkʲɛfka] is a village in the administrative district of Gmina Strzegom, within Świdnica County, Lower Silesian Voivodeship, in south-western Poland.

== Economy ==
Żółkiewka, along with the nearby town of Strzegom and several other villages, is an important center for granite mining and stonemasonry in Poland.
