= Międzyrzecze, Lower Silesian Voivodeship =

Międzyrzecze
- Village
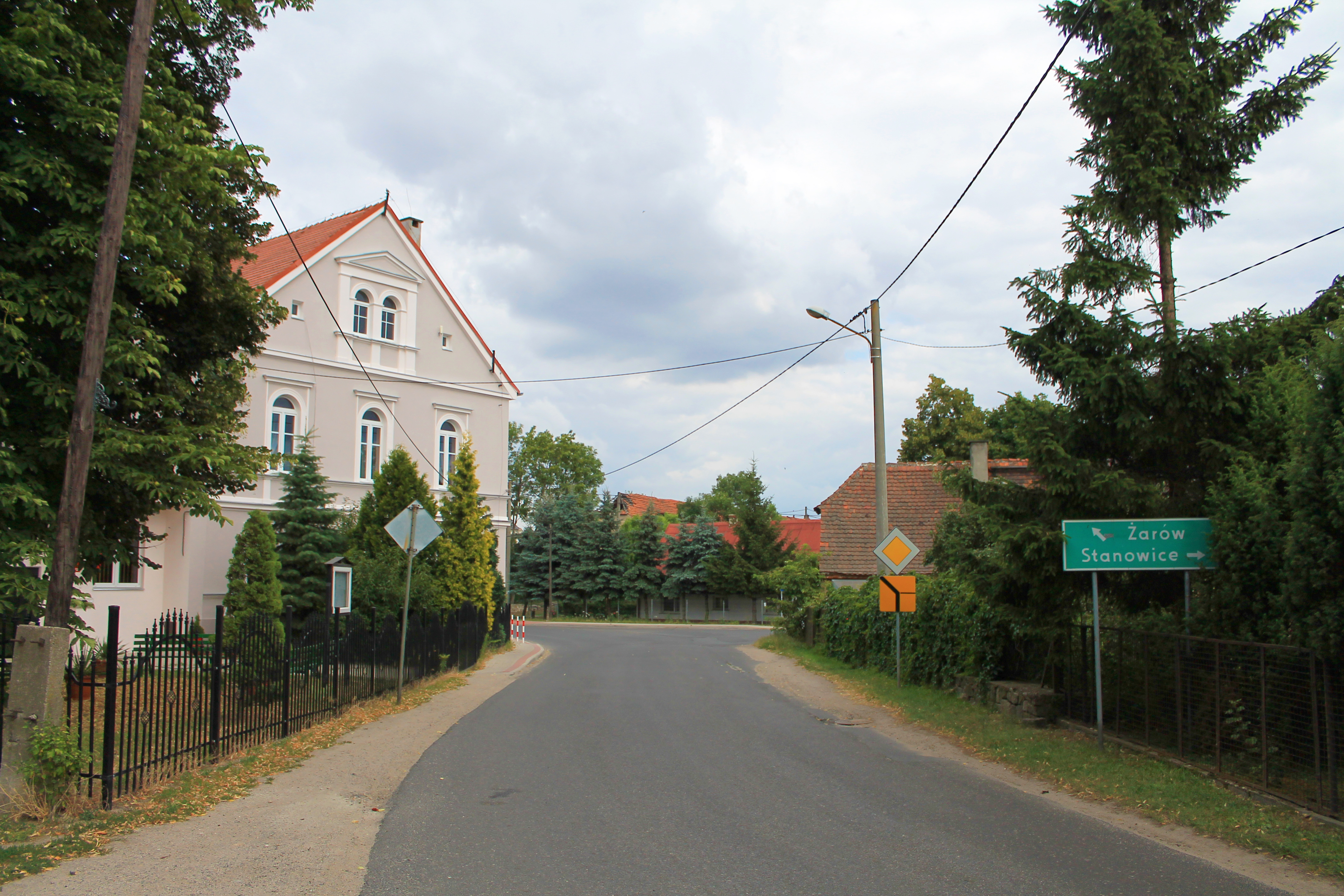

- Location within Poland
- Coordinates: 50°58′N 16°22′E
- Country: Poland
- Voivodeship: Lower Silesian
- County: Świdnica
- Gmina: Strzegom

Międzyrzecze [mjɛnd͡zɨˈʐɛt͡ʂɛ] is a village in the administrative district of Gmina Strzegom, within Świdnica County, Lower Silesian Voivodeship, in south-western Poland.
