= Kostrza, Lower Silesian Voivodeship =

Kostrza
- Village
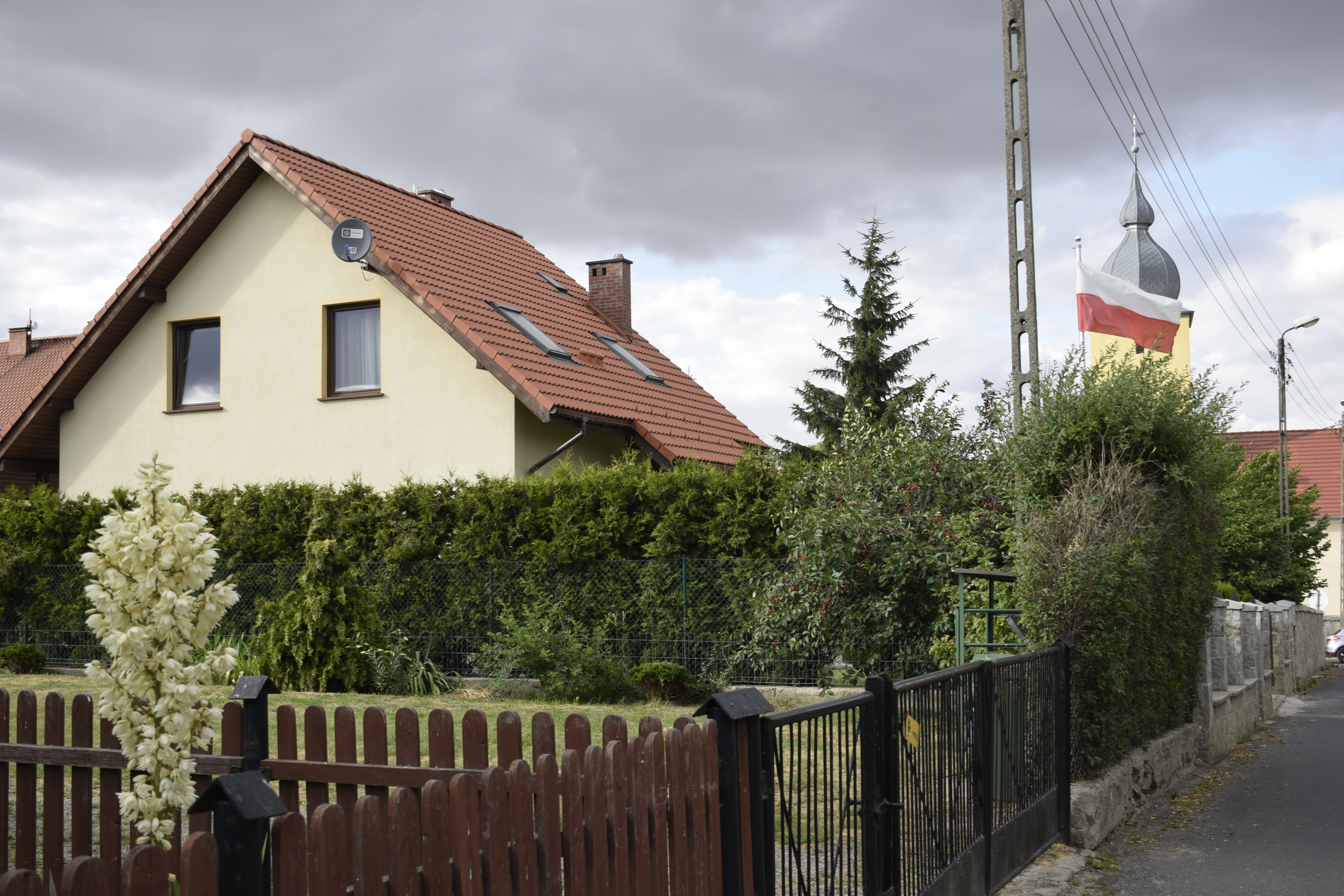

- Location within Poland
- Coordinates: 50°59′06″N 16°15′59″E
- Country: Poland
- Voivodeship: Lower Silesian
- County: Świdnica
- Gmina: Strzegom
- First mentioned: 1290

Population
  - Total: 785
- Time zone: UTC+1 (CET)
  - Summer (DST): UTC+2 (CEST)
- Vehicle registration: DSW

Kostrza [ˈkɔstʂa] is a village in the administrative district of Gmina Strzegom, within Świdnica County, Lower Silesian Voivodeship, in south-western Poland.

== History ==
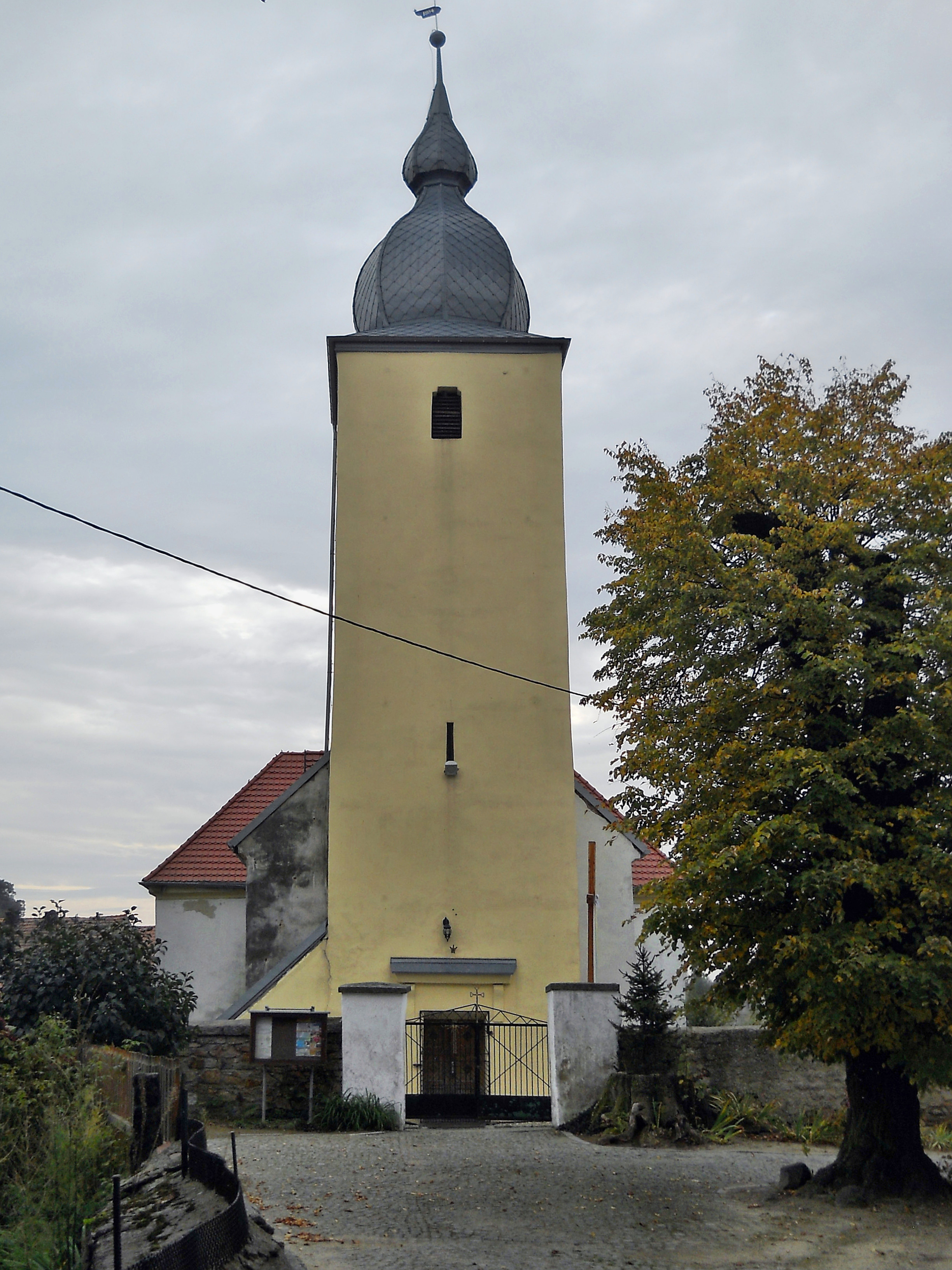
Exaltation of the Holy Cross church

The village was founded by Slavic Lechitic tribes in the Early Middle Ages, and there is an archaeological site from that period in Kostrza. The territory became part of the emerging Polish state in the 10th century. The oldest known written mention of the village comes from a medieval document of Duke Bolko I the Strict from 1290, when it passed from the Duchy of Wrocław to the Duchy of Świdnica and Jawor within fragmented Piast-ruled Poland. It developed as a linear settlement. It is possible that Duke Bernard of Świdnica granted the village to the knight Tyczko in 1318. A church in the village was mentioned in the 1370s. The church contains Renaissance and Baroque furnishings. There was a medieval tower castle, which was rebuilt into a Renaissance water castle in the 16th century, later rebuilt in Baroque style.

During World War II, in 1940, a forced labour subcamp of the Sachsenhausen concentration camp was established by Nazi Germany at a granite quarry north of the village, which in the following year was converted into the Gross-Rosen concentration camp. Its prisoners were mostly Jews, Poles and Soviet citizens. It is now a museum. There was also a forced labour subcamp of the Stalag VIII-A prisoner-of-war camp for Allied POWs in Kostrza.

== Economy ==
Kostrza, along with the nearby town of Strzegom and several other villages, is an important center for granite mining and stonemasonry in Poland, with several quarries in Kostrza itself.

== Sports ==
There is a local association football club Sokół Kostrza, which plays in the lower divisions.
