= Bartoszówek =

- Village
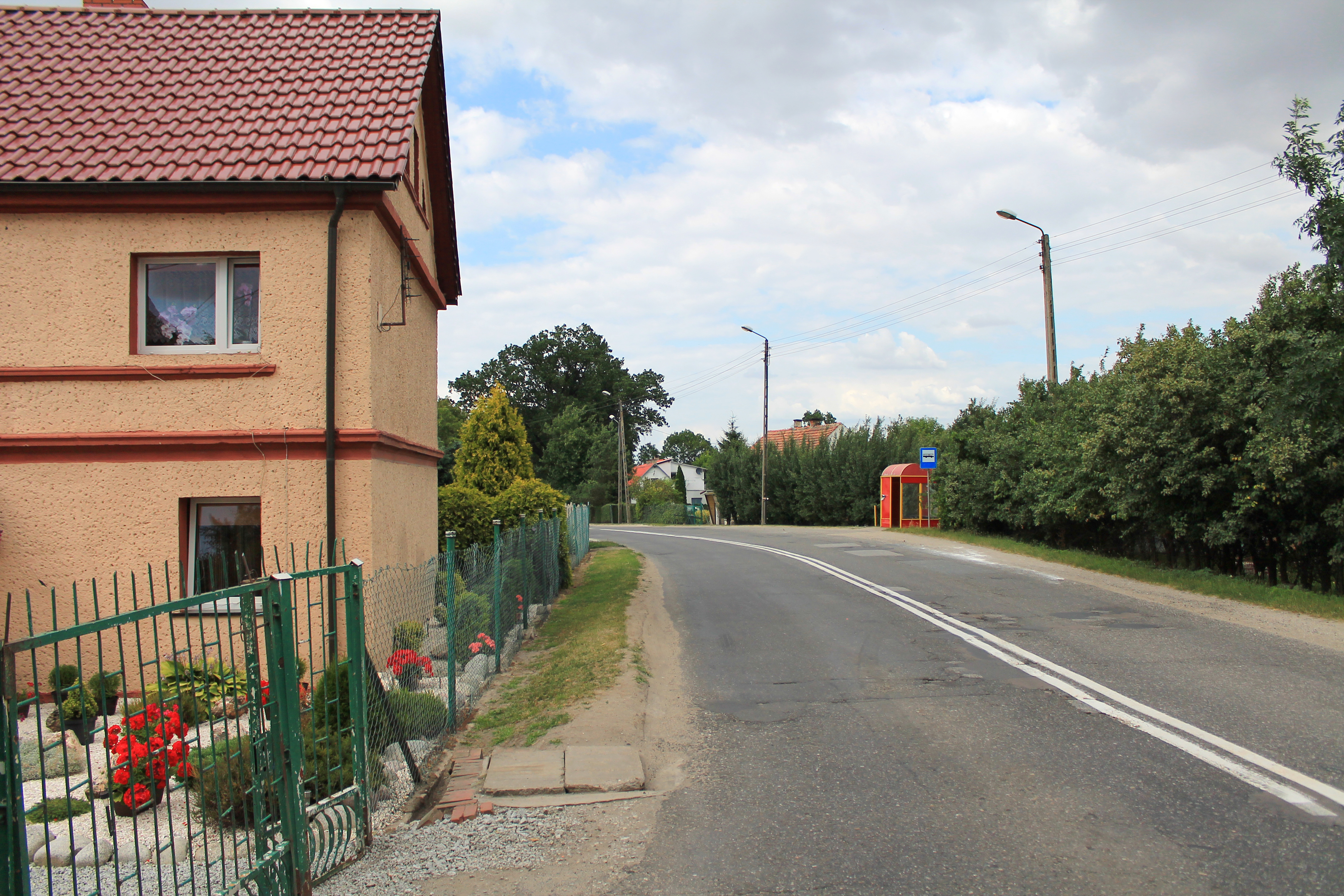

- Location within Poland
- Coordinates: 51°00′11″N 16°23′21″E
- Country: Poland
- Voivodeship: Lower Silesian
- County: Świdnica
- Gmina: Strzegom

Bartoszówek [bartɔˈʂuvɛk] is a village in the administrative district of Gmina Strzegom, within Świdnica County, Lower Silesian Voivodeship, in south-western Poland.

== Notable residents ==
- Manfred von Richthofen (1855-1939), General of Cavalry
- Wolfram Freiherr von Richthofen (1895-1945), Fieldmarshal
- Walter von Wietersheim (1917-2002), officer
