= Goczałków Górny =

- Village
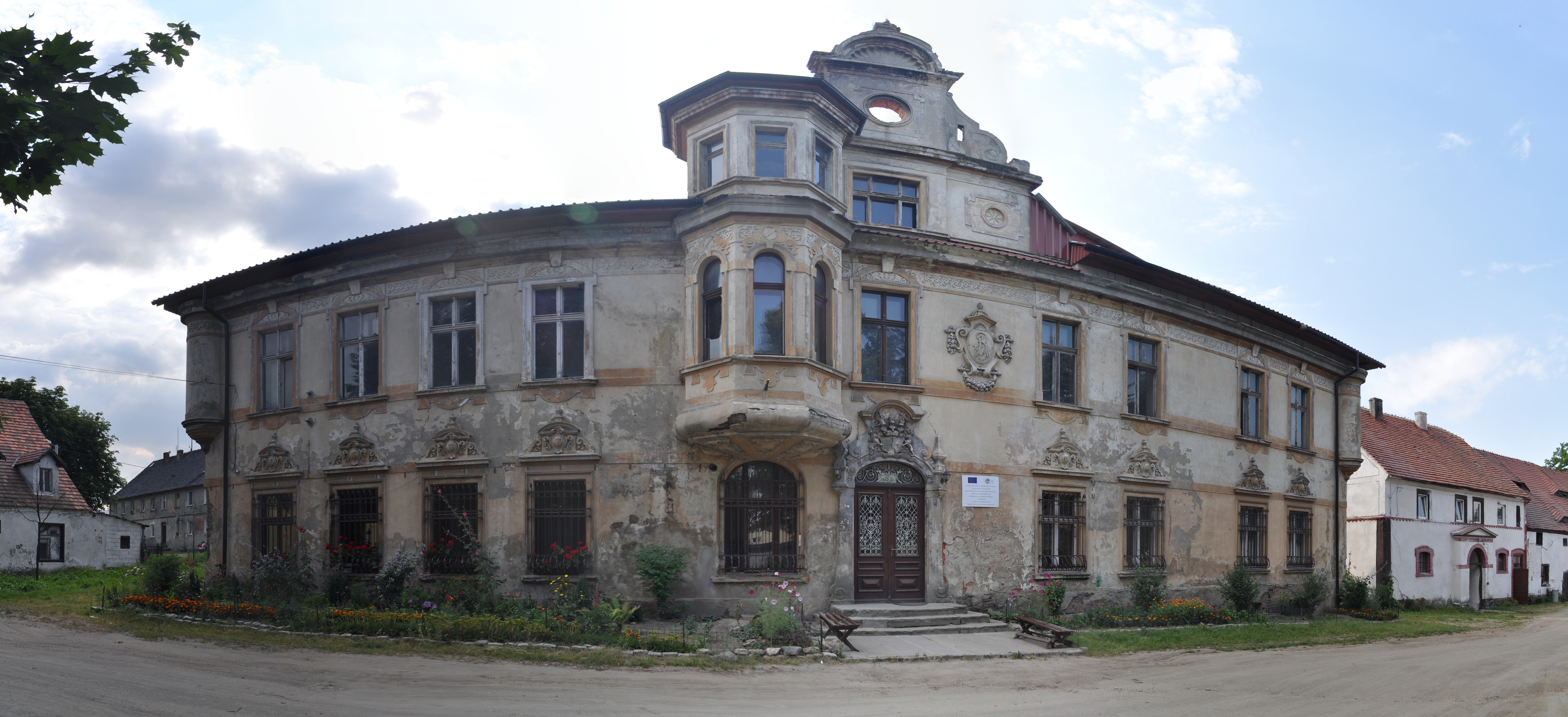

- Location within Poland
- Coordinates: 51°00′33″N 16°21′10″E
- Country: Poland
- Voivodeship: Lower Silesian
- County: Świdnica
- Gmina: Strzegom

Goczałków Górny [ɡɔˈt͡ʂau̯kuf ˈɡurnɨ] is a village in the administrative district of Gmina Strzegom, within Świdnica County, Lower Silesian Voivodeship, in south-western Poland.
