= Granica, Lower Silesian Voivodeship =

Granica
- Village
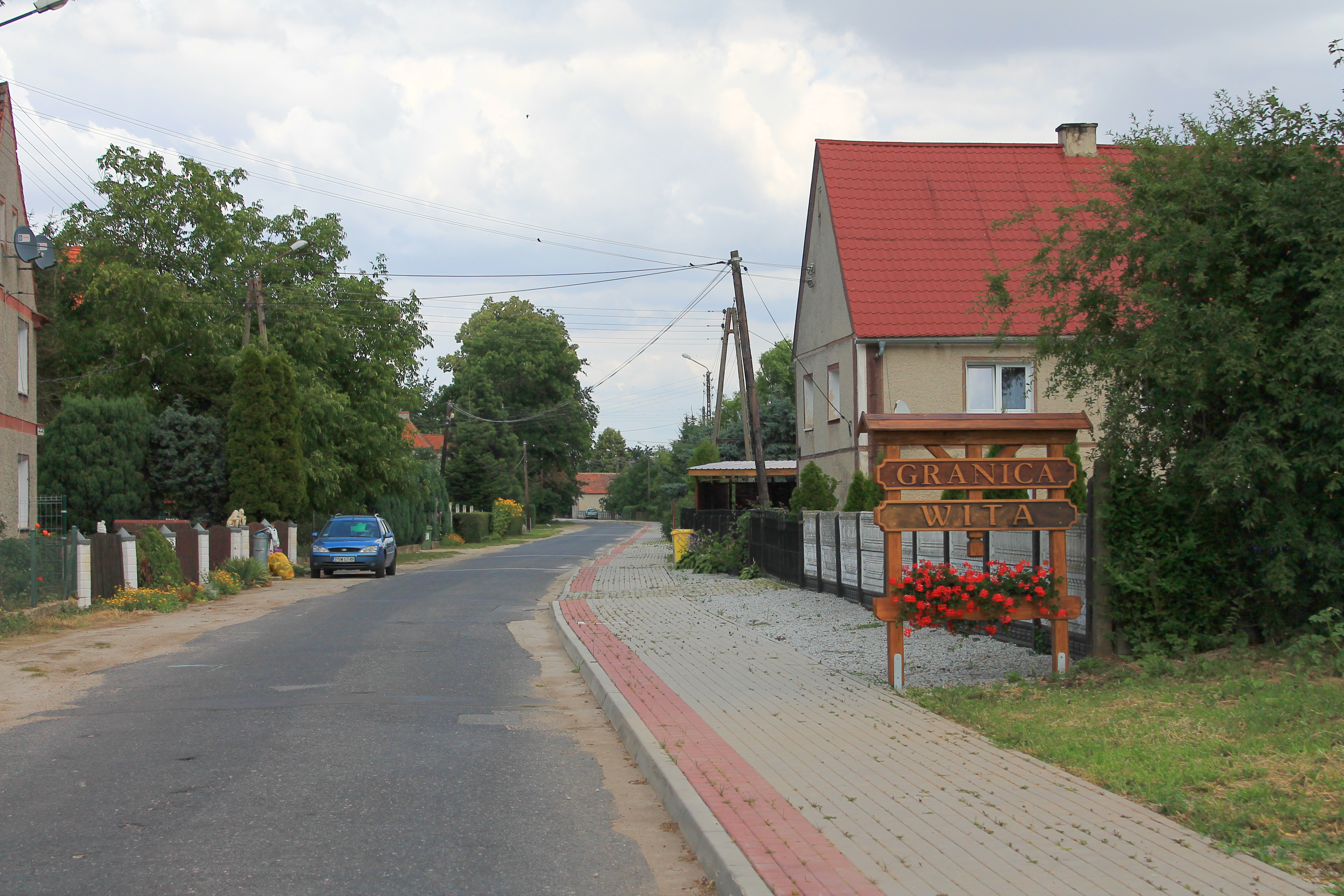
- Granica in 2018

- Location within Poland
- Coordinates: 50°55′51″N 16°18′34″E
- Country: Poland
- Voivodeship: Lower Silesian
- County: Świdnica
- Gmina: Strzegom

Granica [ɡraˈnit͡sa] is a village in the administrative district of Gmina Strzegom, within Świdnica County, Lower Silesian Voivodeship, in south-western Poland.
