= Morawa, Lower Silesian Voivodeship =

Morawa
- Village
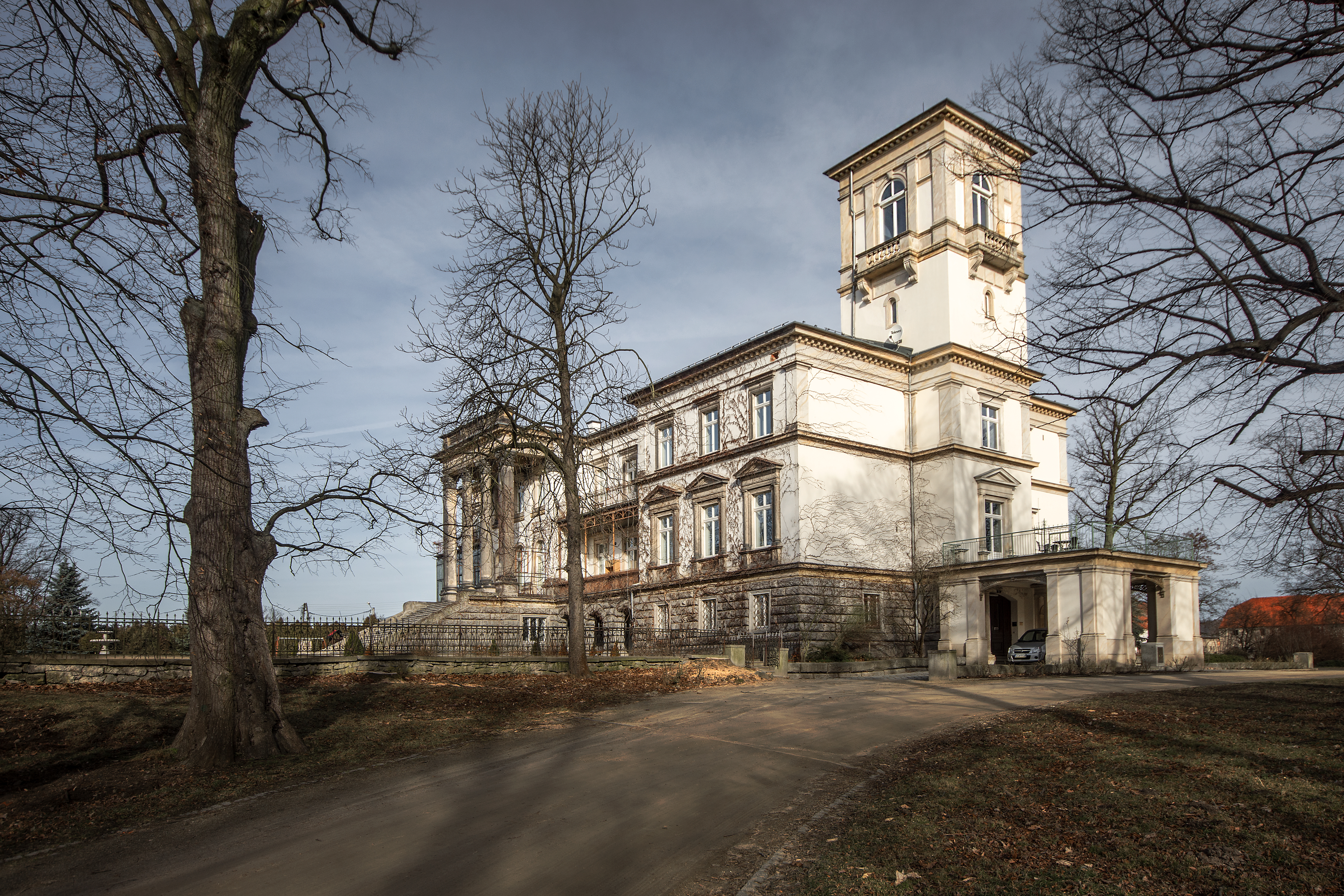
- Palace

- Location within Poland
- Coordinates: 50°58′04″N 16°23′38″E
- Country: Poland
- Voivodeship: Lower Silesian
- County: Świdnica
- Gmina: Strzegom

Morawa [mɔˈrava] is a village in the administrative district of Gmina Strzegom, within Świdnica County, Lower Silesian Voivodeship, in south-western Poland.
