= Tomkowice =

- Village
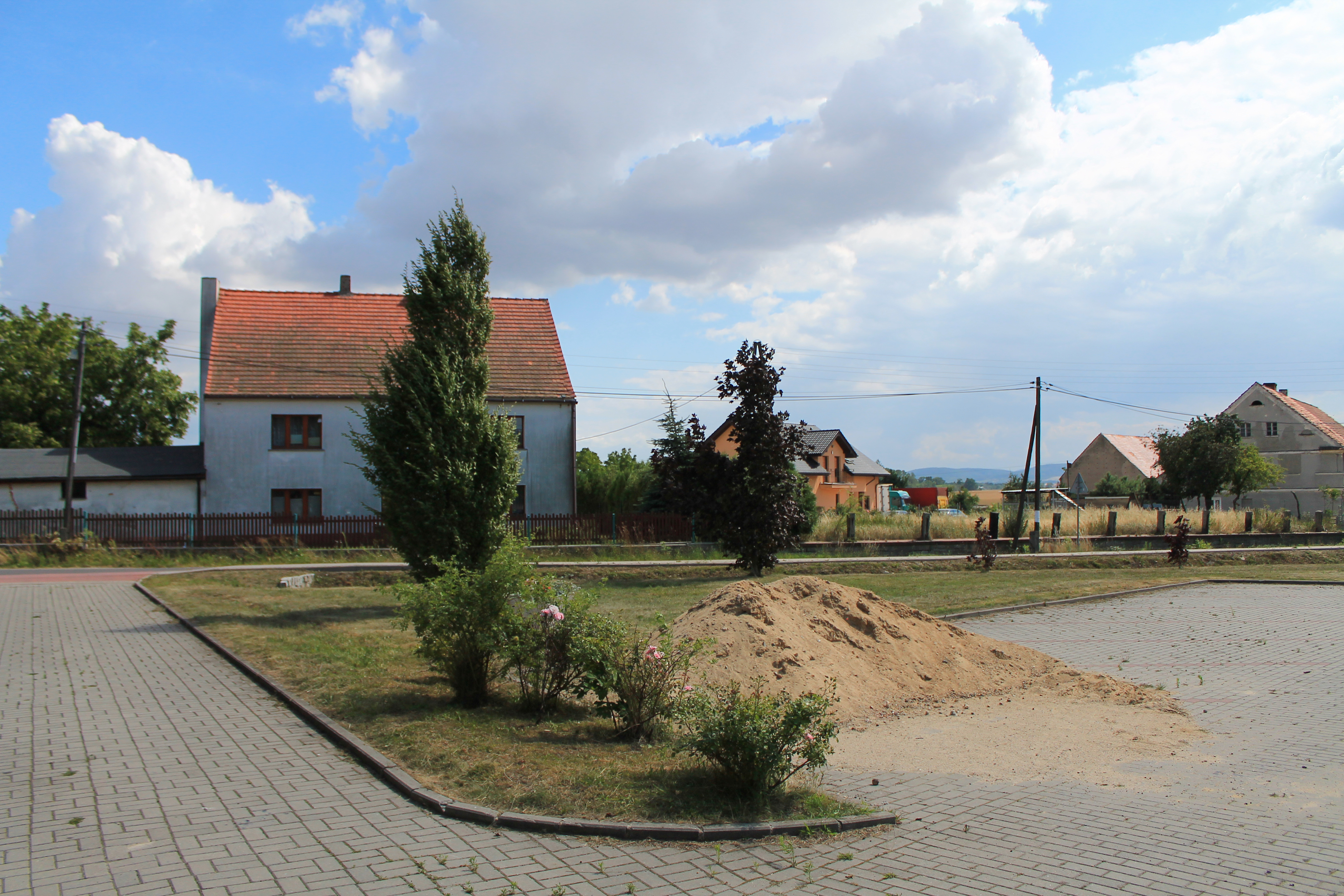

- Location within Poland
- Coordinates: 50°57′N 16°18′E
- Country: Poland
- Voivodeship: Lower Silesian
- County: Świdnica
- Gmina: Strzegom

Tomkowice [tɔmkɔˈvit͡sɛ] is a village in the administrative district of Gmina Strzegom, within Świdnica County, Lower Silesian Voivodeship, in south-western Poland.
