= Stawiska, Lower Silesian Voivodeship =

Stawiska
- Village
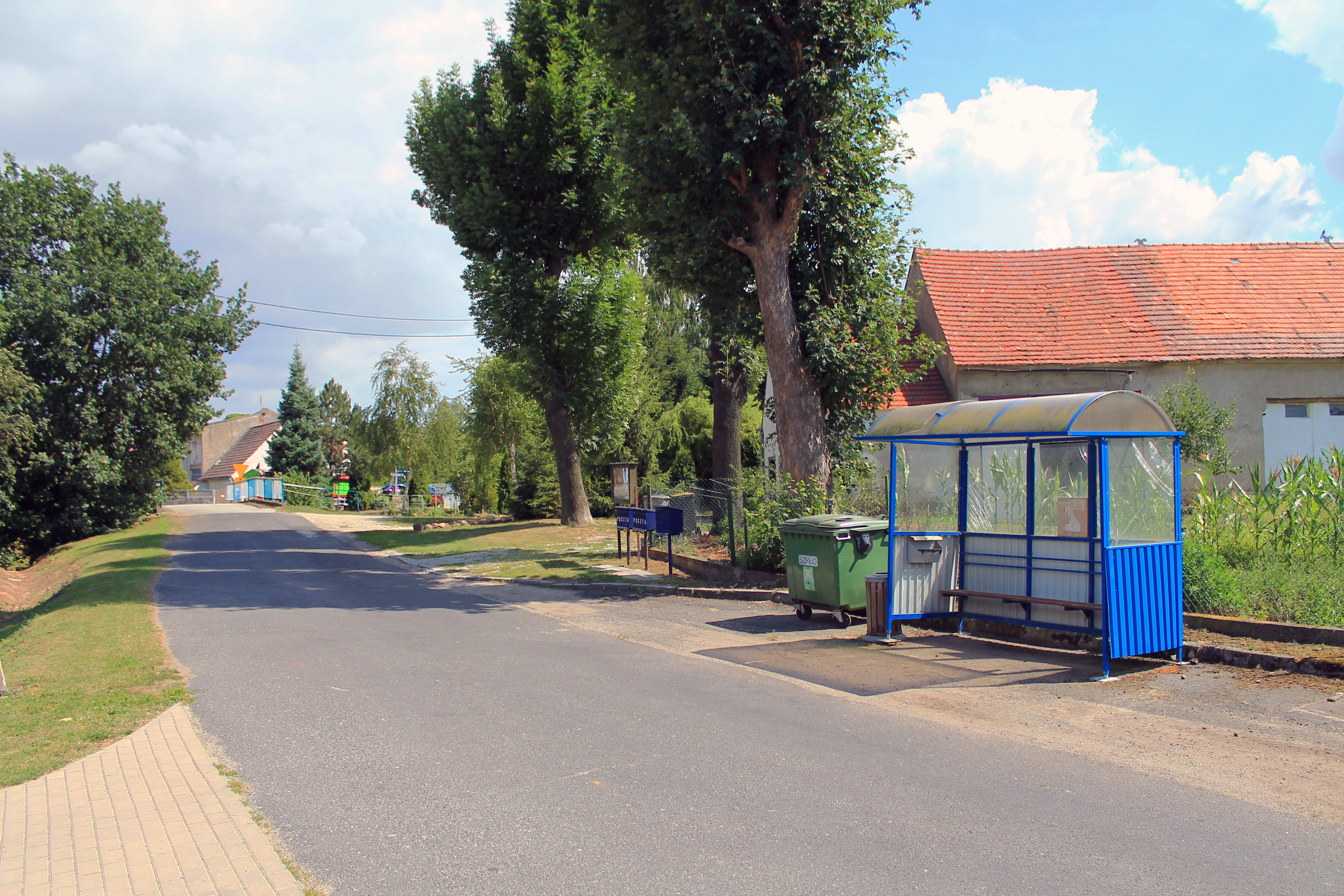

- Location within Poland
- Coordinates: 50°56′24″N 16°19′35″E
- Country: Poland
- Voivodeship: Lower Silesian
- County: Świdnica
- Gmina: Strzegom

Stawiska [staˈviska] is a village in the administrative district of Gmina Strzegom, within Świdnica County, Lower Silesian Voivodeship, in south-western Poland.
