= Godzieszówek =

- Village
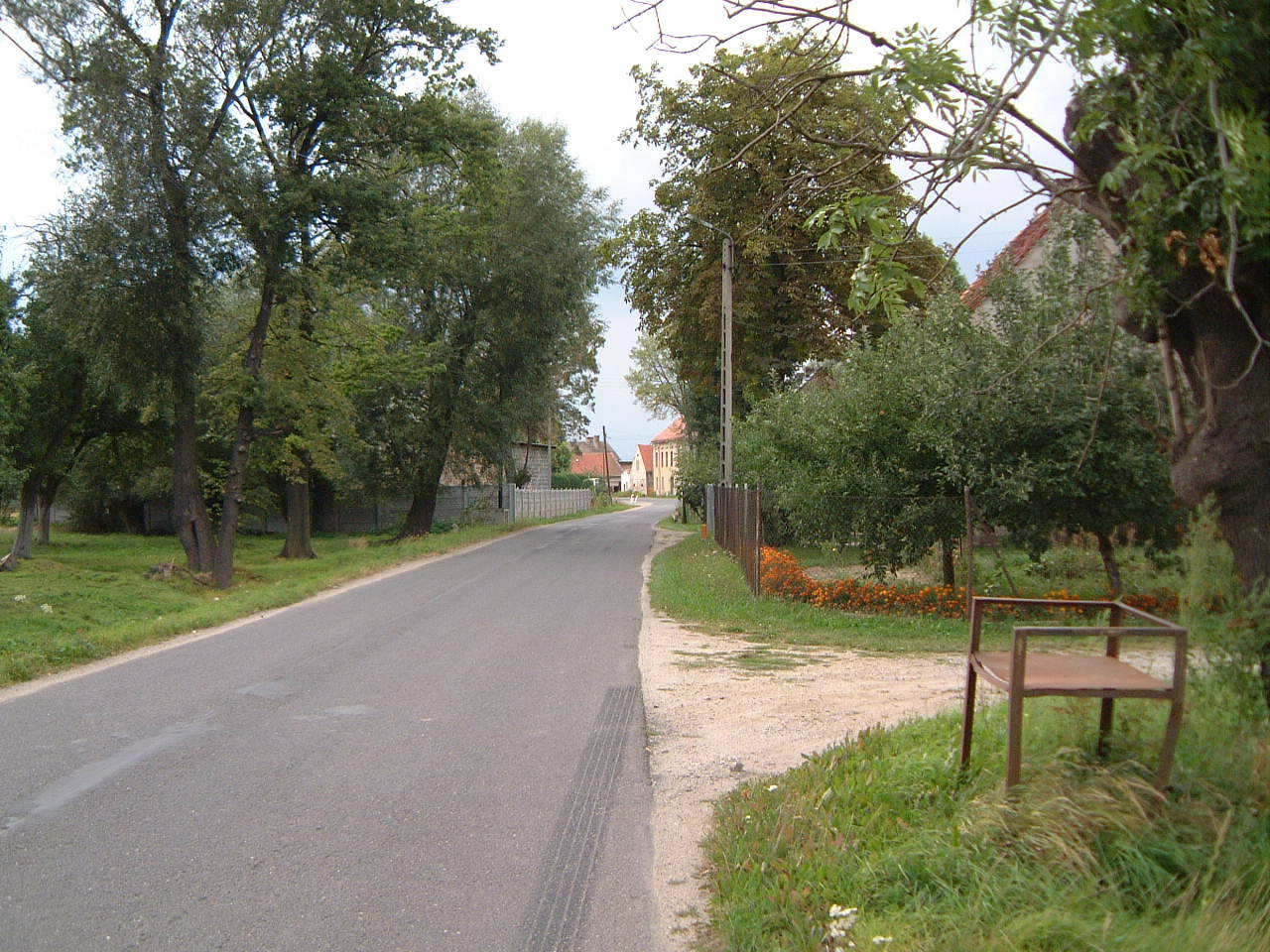
- Godzieszowek

- Location within Poland
- Coordinates: 50°57′29″N 16°16′21″E
- Country: Poland
- Voivodeship: Lower Silesian
- County: Świdnica
- Gmina: Strzegom
- Population: 130

Godzieszówek [ɡɔd͡ʑɛˈʂuvɛk] is a village in the administrative district of Gmina Strzegom, within Świdnica County, Lower Silesian Voivodeship, in south-western Poland.
