= Stanowice, Świdnica County =

Stanowice
- Village
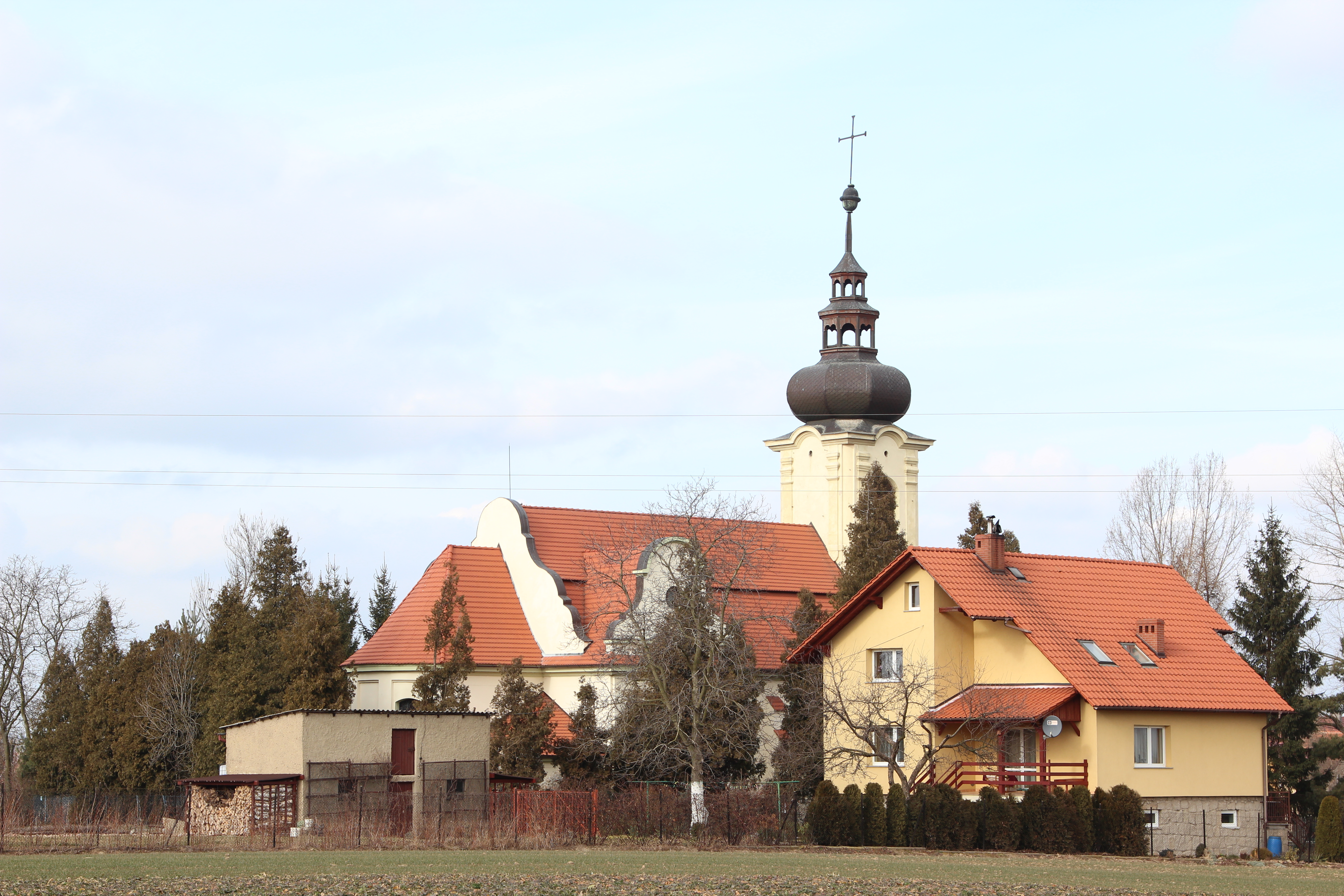
- Sacred Heart church

- Location within Poland
- Coordinates: 50°55′52″N 16°22′25″E
- Country: Poland
- Voivodeship: Lower Silesian
- County: Świdnica
- Gmina: Strzegom

Population (approx.)
  - Total: 1,200
- Time zone: UTC+1 (CET)
  - Summer (DST): UTC+2 (CEST)
- Vehicle registration: DSW
- Website: http://www.stanowice.pl

Stanowice [stanɔˈvit͡sɛ] is a village in the administrative district of Gmina Strzegom, within Świdnica County, Lower Silesian Voivodeship, in south-western Poland.

In the final stages of World War II, on 28 January 1945, a German-organized death march of Allied prisoners of war from the Stalag Luft 7 POW camp stopped in the village.

== Notable residents ==
- Carl Wagener (1901–1988), Wehrmacht general
