= Rusko, Świdnica County =

Rusko
- Village
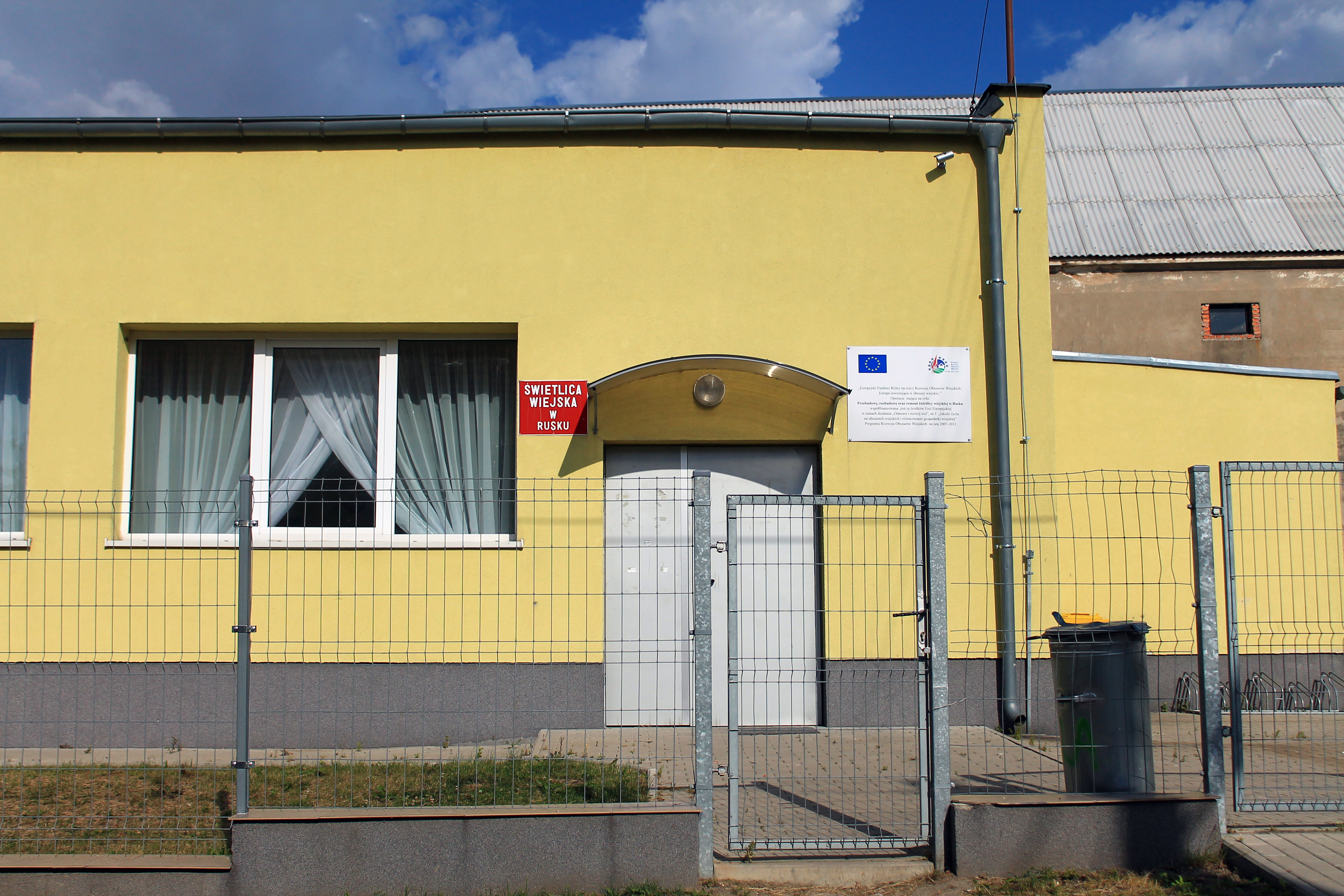
- village meeting hall

- Location within Poland
- Coordinates: 50°59′28″N 16°27′38″E
- Country: Poland
- Voivodeship: Lower Silesian
- County: Świdnica
- Gmina: Strzegom
- Time zone: UTC+1 (CET)
  - Summer (DST): UTC+2 (CEST)
- Vehicle registration: DSW

Rusko [ˈruskɔ] is a village in the administrative district of Gmina Strzegom, within Świdnica County, Lower Silesian Voivodeship, in south-western Poland.

== History ==
When it was part of medieval Piast-ruled Poland, in 1193, the tithe from Rusko was granted to the Canons Regular Monastery in Wrocław. The name of the village is of Polish origin and comes from word róża, which means "rose".
