= Graniczna, Lower Silesian Voivodeship =

Graniczna
- Village
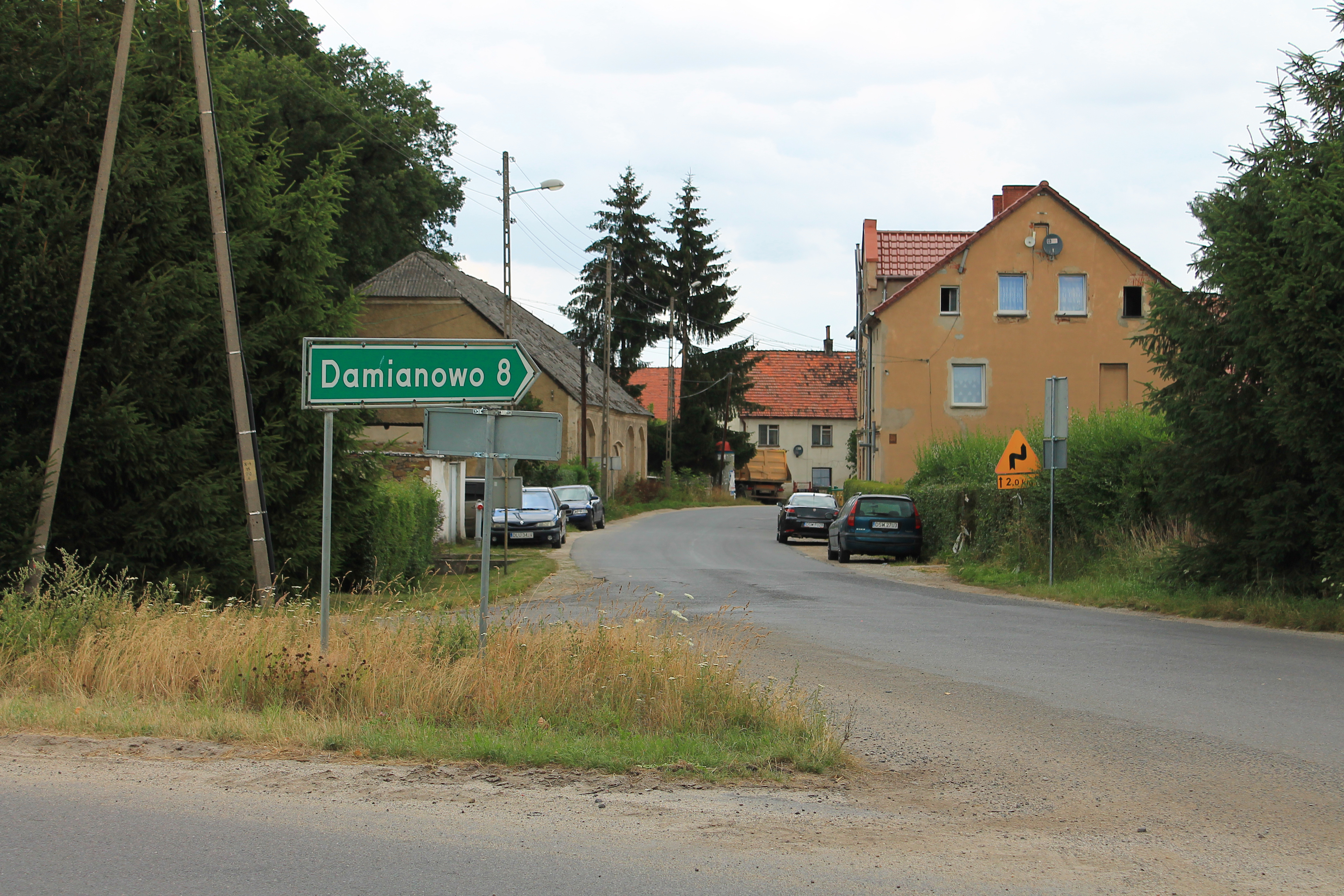

- Location within Poland
- Coordinates: 50°59′41″N 16°21′08″E
- Country: Poland
- Voivodeship: Lower Silesian
- County: Świdnica
- Gmina: Strzegom
- Time zone: UTC+1 (CET)
  - Summer (DST): UTC+2 (CEST)
- Vehicle registration: DSW

Graniczna [ɡraˈnit͡ʂna] is a village in the administrative district of Gmina Strzegom, within Świdnica County, Lower Silesian Voivodeship, in south-western Poland.

== History ==
A stronghold was founded by Slavic Lechitic tribes in the Early Middle Ages, and there is an archaeological site from that period in Graniczna.

During World War II, Nazi Germany operated a forced labour subcamp of the Stalag VIII-A prisoner-of-war camp for Allied POWs in the village.

== Economy ==
Graniczna, along with the nearby town of Strzegom and several other villages, is an important center for granite mining and stonemasonry in Poland.
