= Żelazów, Lower Silesian Voivodeship =

Żelazów
- Village
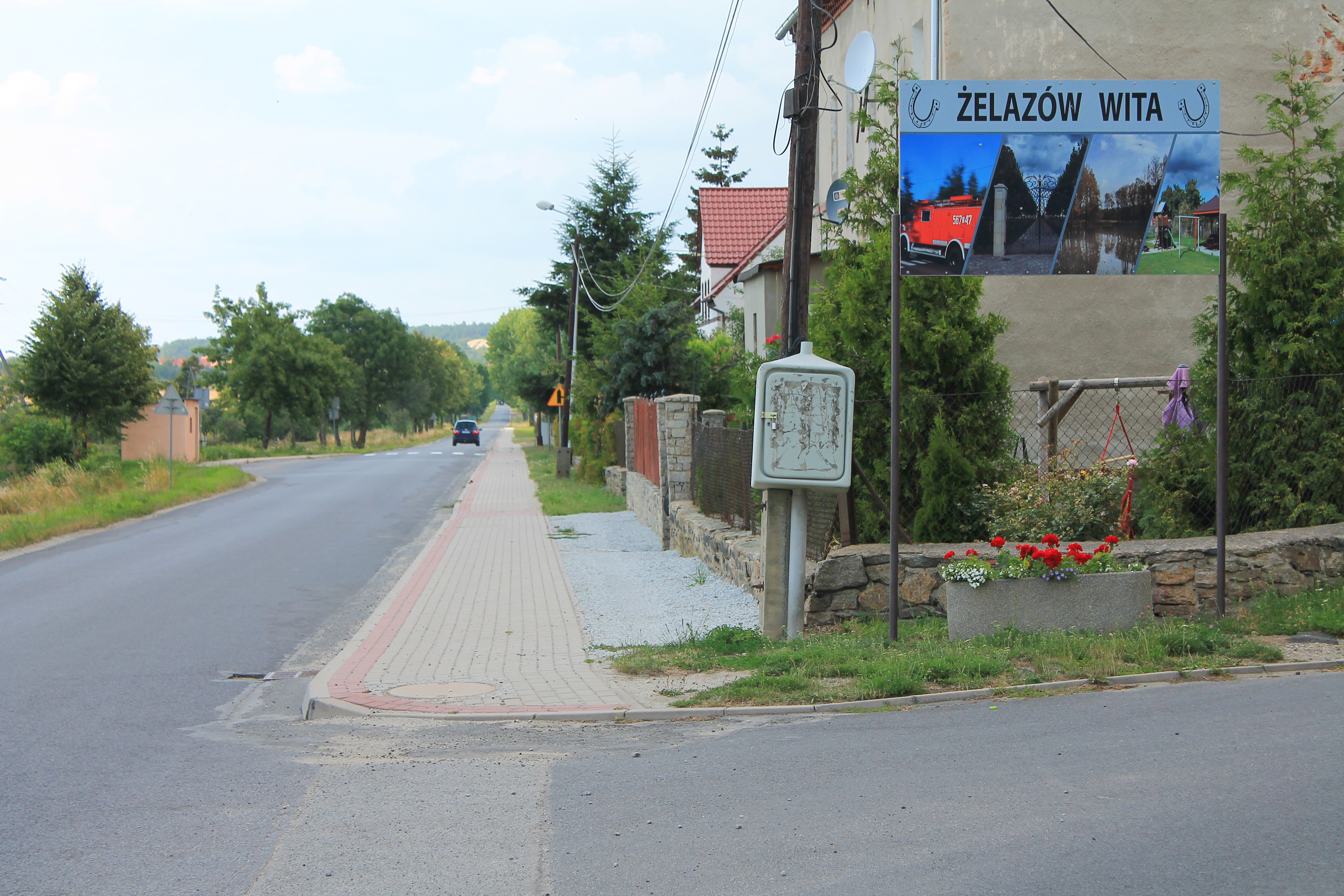

- Location within Poland
- Coordinates: 50°58′40″N 16°17′20″E
- Country: Poland
- Voivodeship: Lower Silesian
- County: Świdnica
- Gmina: Strzegom
- Population (approx.): 200

Żelazów [ʐɛˈlazuf] is a village in the administrative district of Gmina Strzegom, within Świdnica County, Lower Silesian Voivodeship, in south-western Poland.
