= Gutkowice =

- Village
- Location within Poland
- Coordinates: 51°45′50″N 20°2′19″E
- Country: Poland
- Voivodeship: Łódź
- County: Tomaszów
- Gmina: Żelechlinek

Gutkowice [ɡutkɔˈvit͡sɛ] is a village in the administrative district of Gmina Żelechlinek, in Tomaszów County, Łódź Voivodeship in central Poland, approximately 6 km (4 mi) north of Żelechlinek, 28 km (17 mi) north of Tomaszów Mazowiecki, and 40 km (25 mi) east of the regional capital Łódź.
