= Wolica, Gmina Żelechlinek =

Wolica
- Village
- Location within Poland
- Coordinates: 51°43′31″N 20°6′14″E
- Country: Poland
- Voivodeship: Łódź
- County: Tomaszów
- Gmina: Żelechlinek
- Population: 40

Wolica [vɔˈlit͡sa] is a village in the administrative district of Gmina Żelechlinek, in Tomaszów County, Łódź Voivodeship in central Poland, approximately 5 km (3 mi) east of Żelechlinek, 24 km (15 mi) north of Tomaszów Mazowiecki, and 45 km (28 mi) east of the regional capital Łódź.

In 2005 the village had a population of 40.
