= Łochów Stary, Łódź Voivodeship =

Łochów Stary
- Village
- Location within Poland
- Coordinates: 51°44′16″N 20°6′10″E
- Country: Poland
- Voivodeship: Łódź
- County: Tomaszów
- Gmina: Żelechlinek

Łochów Stary [ˈwɔxuf ˈstarɨ] is a village in the administrative district of Gmina Żelechlinek, in Tomaszów County, Łódź Voivodeship in central Poland, approximately 6 km (4 mi) north-east of Żelechlinek, 26 km (16 mi) north of Tomaszów Mazowiecki, and 45 km (28 mi) east of the regional capital Łódź.
