= Gutkowice-Nowiny =

- Village
- Location within Poland
- Coordinates: 51°44′50″N 20°1′32″E
- Country: Poland
- Voivodeship: Łódź
- County: Tomaszów
- Gmina: Żelechlinek

Gutkowice-Nowiny [ɡutkɔˈvit͡sɛ nɔˈvinɨ] is a village in the administrative district of Gmina Żelechlinek, in Tomaszów County, Łódź Voivodeship, in central Poland. It is approximately 4 km (2 mi) north of Żelechlinek, 26 km (16 mi) north of Tomaszów Mazowiecki, and 39 km (24 mi) east of the regional capital Łódź.
