= Rosocha =

Rosocha may refer to the following places:

- Rosocha, Kalisz County in Greater Poland Voivodeship (central Poland)
- Rosocha, Koło County in Greater Poland Voivodeship (central Poland)
- Rosocha, Konin County in Greater Poland Voivodeship (central Poland)
- Rosocha, Łódź Voivodeship (central Poland)
- Rosocha, Masovian Voivodeship (east-central Poland)
- Rosocha, Bytów County in Pomeranian Voivodeship (northern Poland)
- Rosocha, Warmian-Masurian Voivodeship (north Poland)
- Rosocha, West Pomeranian Voivodeship (north-west Poland)

== See also ==
- Rossocha, a village in Gmina Rawa Mazowiecka, Rawa County, Łódź Voivodeship, central Poland
