= Feliksów =

Feliksów may refer to the following places:

- Feliksów, Opoczno County in Łódź Voivodeship (central Poland)
- Feliksów, Poddębice County in Łódź Voivodeship (central Poland)
- Feliksów, Lublin Voivodeship (east Poland)
- Feliksów, Radomsko County in Łódź Voivodeship (central Poland)
- Feliksów, Gmina Żelechlinek, Tomaszów County in Łódź Voivodeship (central Poland)
- Feliksów, Zgierz County in Łódź Voivodeship (central Poland)
- Feliksów, Gostynin County in Masovian Voivodeship (east-central Poland)
- Feliksów, Sochaczew County in Masovian Voivodeship (east-central Poland)
- Feliksów, Warsaw West County in Masovian Voivodeship (east-central Poland)
- Feliksów, Żyrardów County in Masovian Voivodeship (east-central Poland)
- Feliksów, Turek County in Greater Poland Voivodeship (west-central Poland)
