= Młynek, Tomaszów County =

Młynek
- Village
- Location within Poland
- Coordinates: 51°38′28″N 19°54′28″E
- Country: Poland
- Voivodeship: Łódź
- County: Tomaszów
- Gmina: Ujazd

Młynek [ˈmwɨnɛk] is a village in the administrative district of Gmina Ujazd, within Tomaszów County, Łódź Voivodeship, in central Poland.
