= Teodorów, Gmina Budziszewice =

Teodorów
- Village
- Location within Poland
- Coordinates: 51°41′7″N 19°56′9″E
- Country: Poland
- Voivodeship: Łódź
- County: Tomaszów
- Gmina: Budziszewice

Teodorów [tɛɔˈdɔruf] is a village in the administrative district of Gmina Budziszewice, within Tomaszów County, Łódź Voivodeship, in central Poland.
