= Teklin =

Teklin may refer to the following places:

- Teklin, Piotrków County in Łódź Voivodeship (central Poland)
- Teklin, Gmina Żelechlinek, Tomaszów County in Łódź Voivodeship (central Poland)
- Teklin, Lublin Voivodeship (east Poland)
- Teklin, Greater Poland Voivodeship (west-central Poland)
