= Helenów, Gmina Budziszewice =

Helenów
- Village
- Location within Poland
- Coordinates: 51°40′57″N 19°57′42″E
- Country: Poland
- Voivodeship: Łódź
- County: Tomaszów
- Gmina: Budziszewice
- Population: 20

Helenów [xɛˈlɛnuf] is a village in the administrative district of Gmina Budziszewice, within Tomaszów County, Łódź Voivodeship, in central Poland.
