= Ciosny, Tomaszów County =

Ciosny
- Village
- Location within Poland
- Coordinates: 51°38′9″N 19°51′35″E
- Country: Poland
- Voivodeship: Łódź
- County: Tomaszów
- Gmina: Ujazd

Ciosny [ˈt͡ɕɔsnɨ] is a village in the administrative district of Gmina Ujazd, within Tomaszów County, Łódź Voivodeship, in central Poland.
