= Stanisławów, Gmina Żelechlinek =

Stanisławów
- Village
- Location within Poland
- Coordinates: 51°41′26″N 20°00′33″E
- Country: Poland
- Voivodeship: Łódź
- County: Tomaszów
- Gmina: Żelechlinek

Stanisławów [staniˈswavuf] is a village in the administrative district of Gmina Żelechlinek, within Tomaszów County, Łódź Voivodeship, in central Poland.
