= Brenik =

- Village
- Location within Poland
- Coordinates: 51°44′58″N 20°3′33″E
- Country: Poland
- Voivodeship: Łódź
- County: Tomaszów
- Gmina: Żelechlinek

Brenik [ˈbrɛnik] is a village in the administrative district of Gmina Żelechlinek, within Tomaszów County, Łódź Voivodeship, in central Poland.
