= Rzeczków =

Rzeczków may refer to the following places:

- Rzeczków, Rawa County in Łódź Voivodeship (central Poland)
- Rzeczków, Skierniewice County in Łódź Voivodeship (central Poland)
- Rzeczków, Gmina Będków, Tomaszów County in Łódź Voivodeship (central Poland)
- Rzeczków, Masovian Voivodeship (east-central Poland)
