= Teodorów, Gmina Będków =

Teodorów
- Village
- Location within Poland
- Coordinates: 51°37′25″N 19°43′36″E
- Country: Poland
- Voivodeship: Łódź
- County: Tomaszów
- Gmina: Będków

Teodorów [tɛɔˈdɔruf] is a village in the administrative district of Gmina Będków, within Tomaszów County, Łódź Voivodeship, in central Poland.
