= Lipianki =

Lipianki may refer to the following places:

- Lipianki, Łódź Voivodeship (central Poland)
- Lipianki, Masovian Voivodeship (east-central Poland)
- Lipianki, Pomeranian Voivodeship (north Poland)
