= Ceniawy =

- Village
- Location within Poland
- Coordinates: 51°33′47″N 19°47′34″E
- Country: Poland
- Voivodeship: Łódź
- County: Tomaszów
- Gmina: Będków

Ceniawy [t͡sɛˈɲavɨ] is a village in the administrative district of Gmina Będków, within Tomaszów County, Łódź Voivodeship, in central Poland.
