= Remiszewice =

- Village
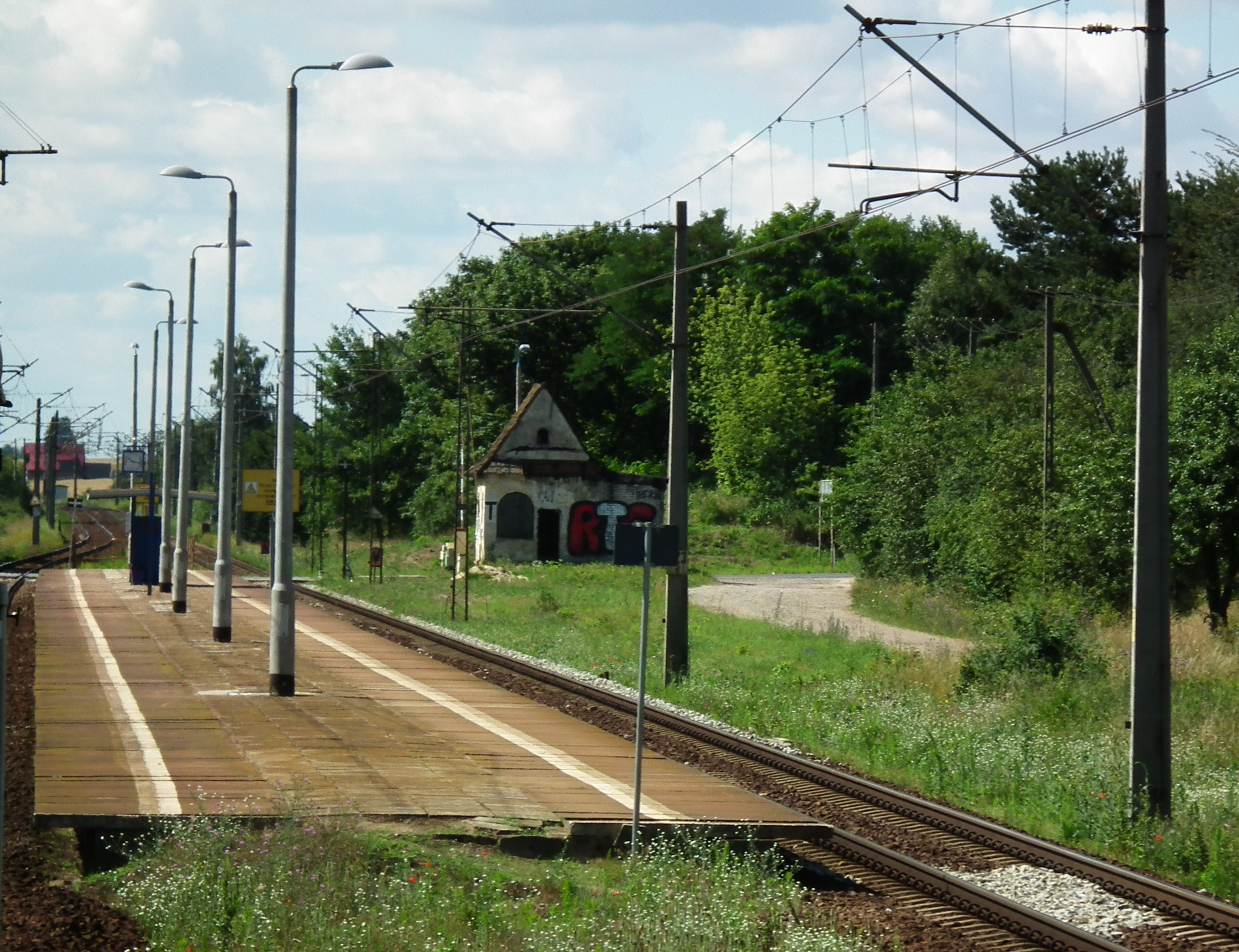
- Railway station

- Location within Poland
- Coordinates: 51°35′1″N 19°43′31″E
- Country: Poland
- Voivodeship: Łódź
- County: Tomaszów
- Gmina: Będków

Remiszewice [rɛmiʂɛˈvit͡sɛ] is a village in the administrative district of Gmina Będków, within Tomaszów County, Łódź Voivodeship, in central Poland.
