= Ignatów, Łódź Voivodeship =

Ignatów
- Village
- Location within Poland
- Coordinates: 51°43′56″N 19°59′7″E
- Country: Poland
- Voivodeship: Łódź
- County: Tomaszów
- Gmina: Żelechlinek

Ignatów [iɡˈnatuf] is a village in the administrative district of Gmina Żelechlinek, within Tomaszów County, Łódź Voivodeship, in central Poland.
