= Łączkowice, Tomaszów County =

Łączkowice
- Village
- Location within Poland
- Coordinates: 51°38′24″N 19°52′42″E
- Country: Poland
- Voivodeship: Łódź
- County: Tomaszów
- Gmina: Ujazd
- Population: 60

Łączkowice [wɔnt͡ʂkɔˈvit͡sɛ] is a village in the administrative district of Gmina Ujazd, within Tomaszów County, Łódź Voivodeship, in central Poland.
