= Żelechlin, Łódź Voivodeship =

Żelechlin
- Village
- Location within Poland
- Coordinates: 51°42′30″N 20°0′21″E
- Country: Poland
- Voivodeship: Łódź
- County: Tomaszów
- Gmina: Żelechlinek

Żelechlin [ʐɛˈlɛxlin] is a village in the administrative district of Gmina Żelechlinek, within Tomaszów County, Łódź Voivodeship, in central Poland.
