= Łaznówek =

- Village
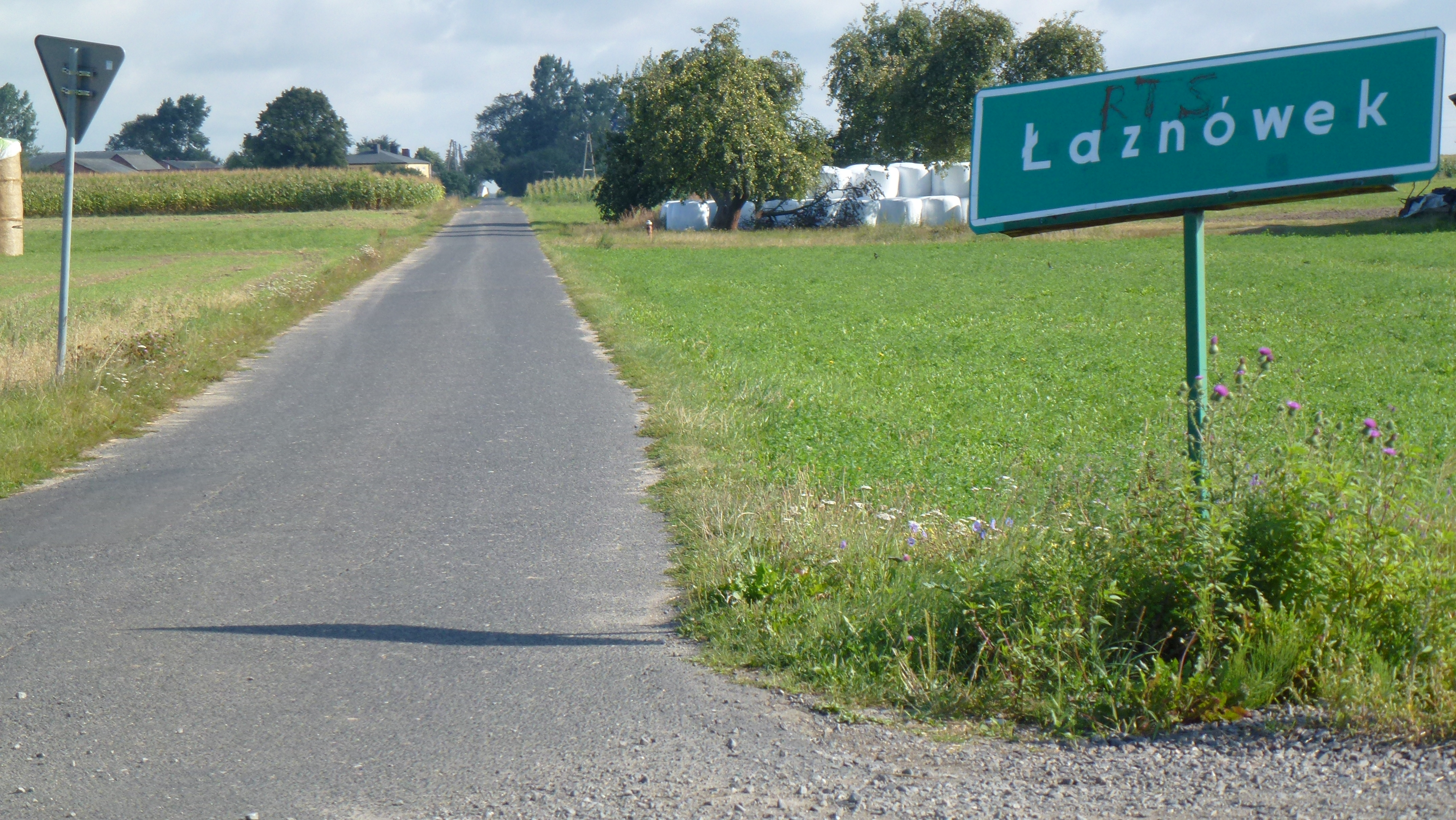

- Location within Poland
- Coordinates: 51°38′54″N 19°49′13″E
- Country: Poland
- Voivodeship: Łódź
- County: Tomaszów
- Gmina: Rokiciny

Łaznówek [wazˈnuvɛk] is a village in the administrative district of Gmina Rokiciny, within Tomaszów County, Łódź Voivodeship, in central Poland.
