= Eminów =

- Village
- Location within Poland
- Coordinates: 51°40′N 19°52′E
- Country: Poland
- Voivodeship: Łódź
- County: Tomaszów
- Gmina: Rokiciny

Eminów [ɛˈminuf] is a village in the administrative district of Gmina Rokiciny, within Tomaszów County, Łódź Voivodeship, in central Poland.
