= Popielawy, Łódź Voivodeship =

Popielawy
- Village
- Location within Poland
- Coordinates: 51°37′N 19°49′E
- Country: Poland
- Voivodeship: Łódź
- County: Tomaszów
- Gmina: Rokiciny

Popielawy [pɔpjɛˈlavɨ] is a village in the administrative district of Gmina Rokiciny, within Tomaszów County, Łódź Voivodeship, in central Poland.
