= Nowe Mierzno =

- Village
- Location within Poland
- Coordinates: 51°40′15″N 19°59′28″E
- Country: Poland
- Voivodeship: Łódź
- County: Tomaszów
- Gmina: Budziszewice

Nowe Mierzno [ˈnɔvɛ ˈmjɛʐnɔ] is a village in the administrative district of Gmina Budziszewice, within Tomaszów County, Łódź Voivodeship, in central Poland.
