= Józefin, Gmina Ujazd =

Józefin
- Village
- Location within Poland
- Coordinates: 51°36′2″N 19°54′7″E
- Country: Poland
- Voivodeship: Łódź
- County: Tomaszów
- Gmina: Ujazd

Józefin [juˈzɛfin] is a village in the administrative district of Gmina Ujazd, within Tomaszów County, Łódź Voivodeship, in central Poland.
