= Stare Chrusty =

- Village
- Location within Poland
- Coordinates: 51°41′50″N 19°45′17″E
- Country: Poland
- Voivodeship: Łódź
- County: Tomaszów
- Gmina: Rokiciny

Stare Chrusty [ˈstarɛ ˈxrustɨ] is a village in the administrative district of Gmina Rokiciny, within Tomaszów County, Łódź Voivodeship, in central Poland.
