= Szymanów =

Szymanów may refer to the following places in Poland:

- Szymanów, Gmina Malczyce, Środa County in Lower Silesian Voivodeship (south-west Poland)
- Szymanów, Świdnica County in Lower Silesian Voivodeship (south-west Poland)
- Szymanów, Trzebnica County in Lower Silesian Voivodeship (south-west Poland)
- Szymanów, Wrocław County in Lower Silesian Voivodeship (south-west Poland)
- Szymanów, Łódź Voivodeship (central Poland)
- Szymanów, Lipsko County in Masovian Voivodeship (east-central Poland)
- Szymanów, Piaseczno County in Masovian Voivodeship (east-central Poland)
- Szymanów, Sochaczew County in Masovian Voivodeship (east-central Poland)
- Szymanów, Greater Poland Voivodeship (west-central Poland)
