= Jankówek, Gmina Rokiciny =

Jankówek
- Village
- Location within Poland
- Coordinates: 51°39′44″N 19°49′20″E
- Country: Poland
- Voivodeship: Łódź
- County: Tomaszów
- Gmina: Rokiciny

Jankówek [janˈkuvɛk] is a village in the administrative district of Gmina Rokiciny, within Tomaszów County, Łódź Voivodeship, in central Poland.
