= Stefanów, Gmina Rokiciny =

Stefanów
- Village
- Location within Poland
- Coordinates: 51°40′51″N 19°48′37″E
- Country: Poland
- Voivodeship: Łódź
- County: Tomaszów
- Gmina: Rokiciny

Stefanów [stɛˈfanuf] is a village in the administrative district of Gmina Rokiciny, within Tomaszów County, Łódź Voivodeship, in central Poland.
