= Łaznów-Kolonia =

- Village
- Location within Poland
- Coordinates: 51°38′N 19°48′E
- Country: Poland
- Voivodeship: Łódź
- County: Tomaszów
- Gmina: Rokiciny

Łaznów-Kolonia [ˈwaznuf kɔˈlɔɲa] is a village in the administrative district of Gmina Rokiciny, within Tomaszów County, Łódź Voivodeship, in central Poland.
