= Adamów, Gmina Budziszewice =

Adamów
- Village
- Location within Poland
- Coordinates: 51°39′59″N 19°57′56″E
- Country: Poland
- Voivodeship: Łódź
- County: Tomaszów
- Gmina: Budziszewice

Adamów [aˈdamuf] is a village in the administrative district of Gmina Budziszewice, within Tomaszów County, Łódź Voivodeship, in central Poland.
