= Janinów, Gmina Rokiciny =

Janinów
- Village
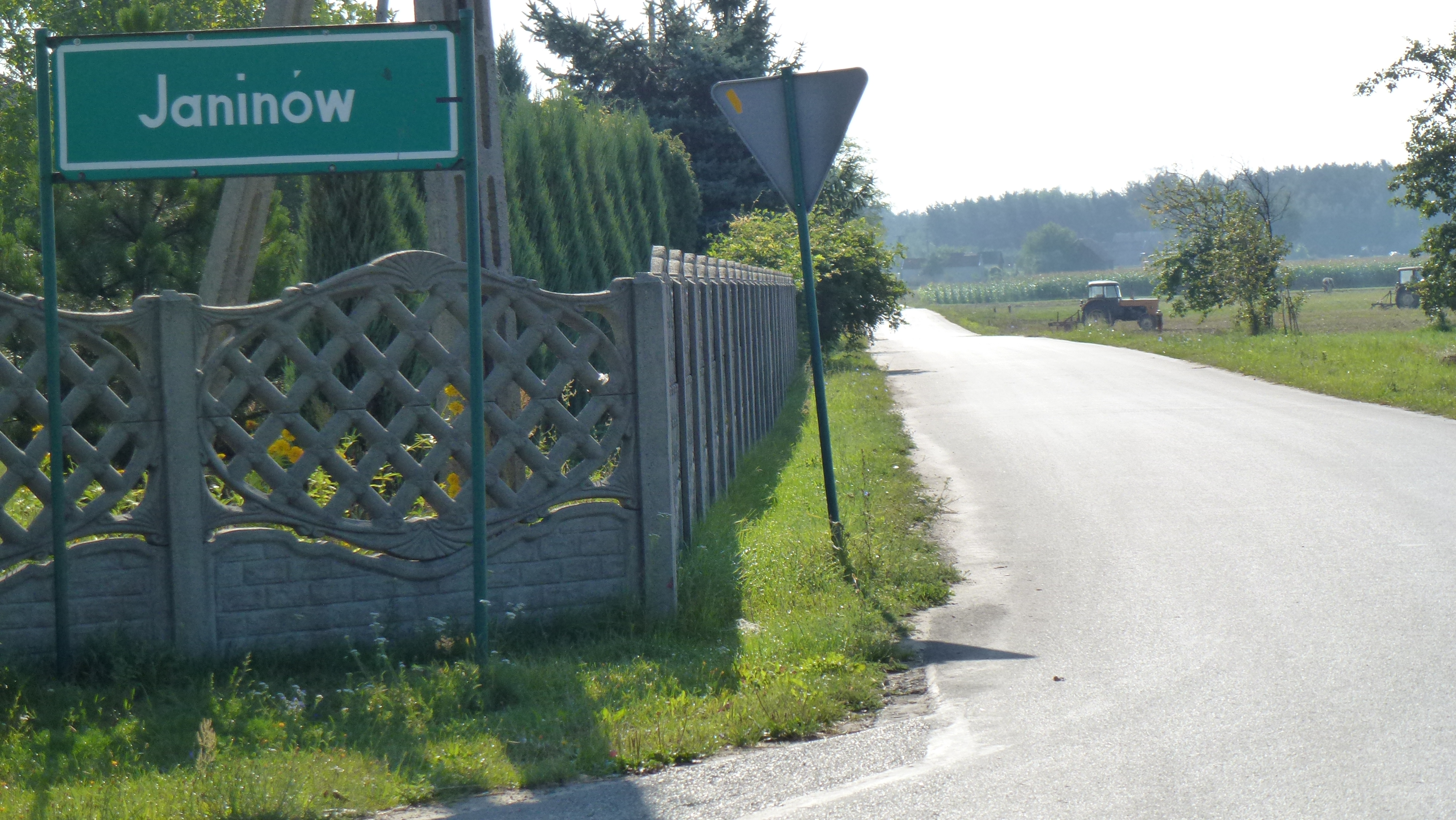

- Location within Poland
- Coordinates: 51°38′33″N 19°49′25″E
- Country: Poland
- Voivodeship: Łódź
- County: Tomaszów
- Gmina: Rokiciny
- Population: 40

Janinów [jaˈninuf] is a village in the administrative district of Gmina Rokiciny, within Tomaszów County, Łódź Voivodeship, in central Poland.
