= Aleksandrów, Tomaszów County =

Aleksandrów
- Village
- Location within Poland
- Coordinates: 51°37′59″N 19°51′38″E
- Country: Poland
- Voivodeship: Łódź
- County: Tomaszów
- Gmina: Ujazd
- Population: 30

Aleksandrów [alɛkˈsandruf] is a village in the administrative district of Gmina Ujazd, within Tomaszów County, Łódź Voivodeship, in central Poland.
