= Sabinów, Gmina Żelechlinek =

Sabinów
- Village
- Location within Poland
- Coordinates: 51°46′N 20°0′E
- Country: Poland
- Voivodeship: Łódź
- County: Tomaszów
- Gmina: Żelechlinek

Sabinów [saˈbinuf] is a village in the administrative district of Gmina Żelechlinek, within Tomaszów County, Łódź Voivodeship, in central Poland.
