= Lucjanów, Gmina Żelechlinek =

Lucjanów
- Village
- Location within Poland
- Coordinates: 51°43′0″N 20°5′13″E
- Country: Poland
- Voivodeship: Łódź
- County: Tomaszów
- Gmina: Żelechlinek

Lucjanów [lut͡sˈjanuf] is a village in the administrative district of Gmina Żelechlinek, within Tomaszów County, Łódź Voivodeship, in central Poland.
