= Helenów, Gmina Ujazd =

Helenów
- Village
- Location within Poland
- Coordinates: 51°35′39″N 19°49′47″E
- Country: Poland
- Voivodeship: Łódź
- County: Tomaszów
- Gmina: Ujazd

Helenów [xɛˈlɛnuf] is a village in the administrative district of Gmina Ujazd, within Tomaszów County, Łódź Voivodeship, in central Poland.
