= Karolinów, Gmina Żelechlinek =

Karolinów
- Village
- Location within Poland
- Coordinates: 51°43′51″N 20°0′22″E
- Country: Poland
- Voivodeship: Łódź
- County: Tomaszów
- Gmina: Żelechlinek

Karolinów [karɔˈlinuf] is a village in the administrative district of Gmina Żelechlinek, within Tomaszów County, Łódź Voivodeship, in central Poland.
