= Zacharz =

- Village
- Location within Poland
- Coordinates: 51°36′26″N 19°45′42″E
- Country: Poland
- Voivodeship: Łódź
- County: Tomaszów
- Gmina: Będków
- Population (approx.): 200

Zacharz [ˈzaxaʂ] is a village in the administrative district of Gmina Będków, within Tomaszów County, Łódź Voivodeship, in central Poland.

The village has an approximate population of 200.
