= Nowy Józefów =

- Village
- Location within Poland
- Coordinates: 51°40′57″N 19°57′42″E
- Country: Poland
- Voivodeship: Łódź
- County: Tomaszów
- Gmina: Budziszewice
- Population: 20

Nowy Józefów (Polish pronunciation: [ˈnɔvɨ juˈzɛfuf]) is a village in the administrative district of Gmina Budziszewice, within Tomaszów County, Łódź Voivodeship, in central Poland.
