= Sługocice, Gmina Będków =

Sługocice
- Village
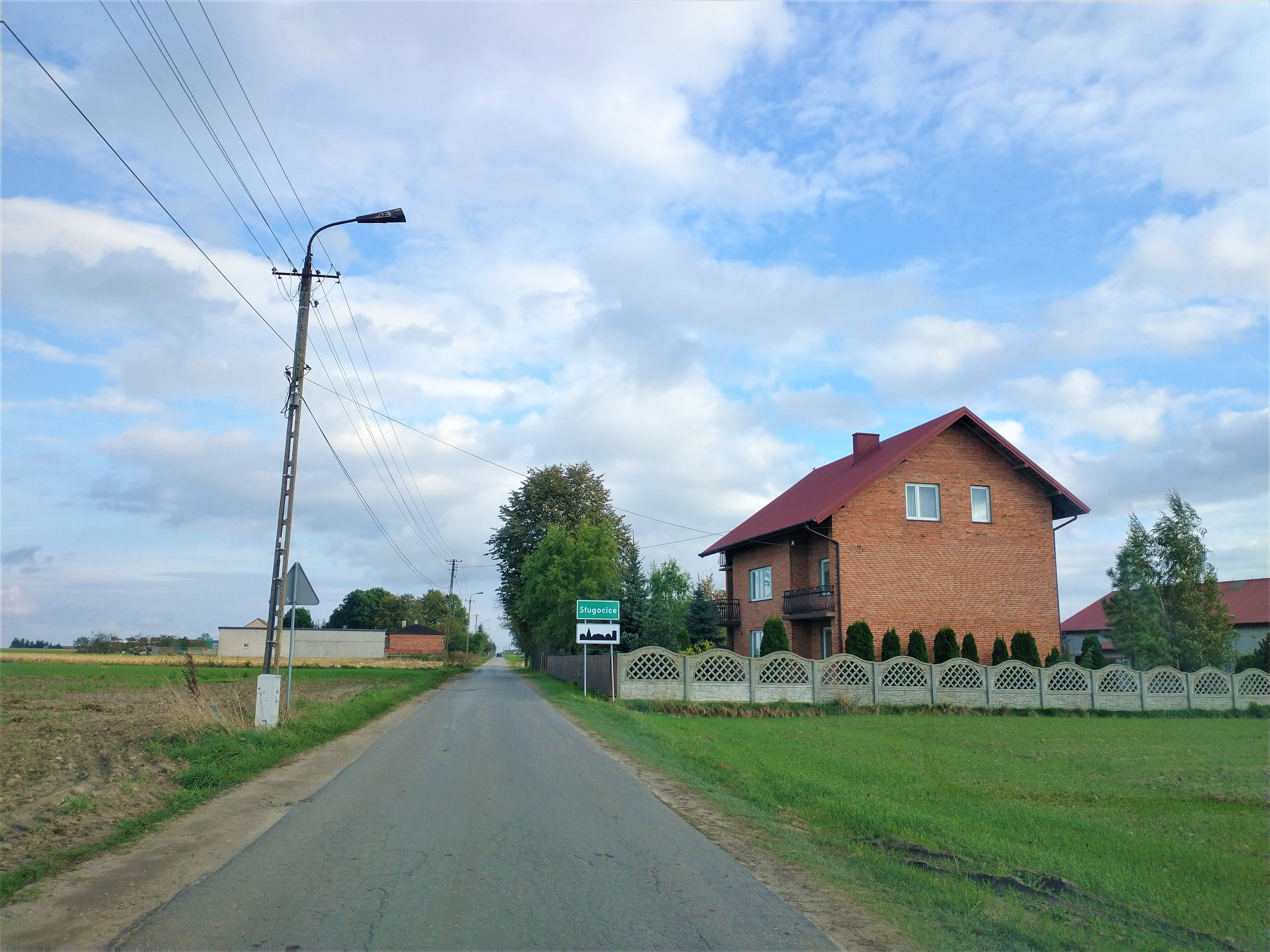

- Location within Poland
- Coordinates: 51°35′36″N 19°46′54″E
- Country: Poland
- Voivodeship: Łódź
- County: Tomaszów
- Gmina: Będków

Sługocice [swuɡɔˈt͡ɕit͡sɛ] is a village in the administrative district of Gmina Będków, within Tomaszów County, Łódź Voivodeship, in central Poland.
