= Gutków, Łódź Voivodeship =

Gutków
- Village
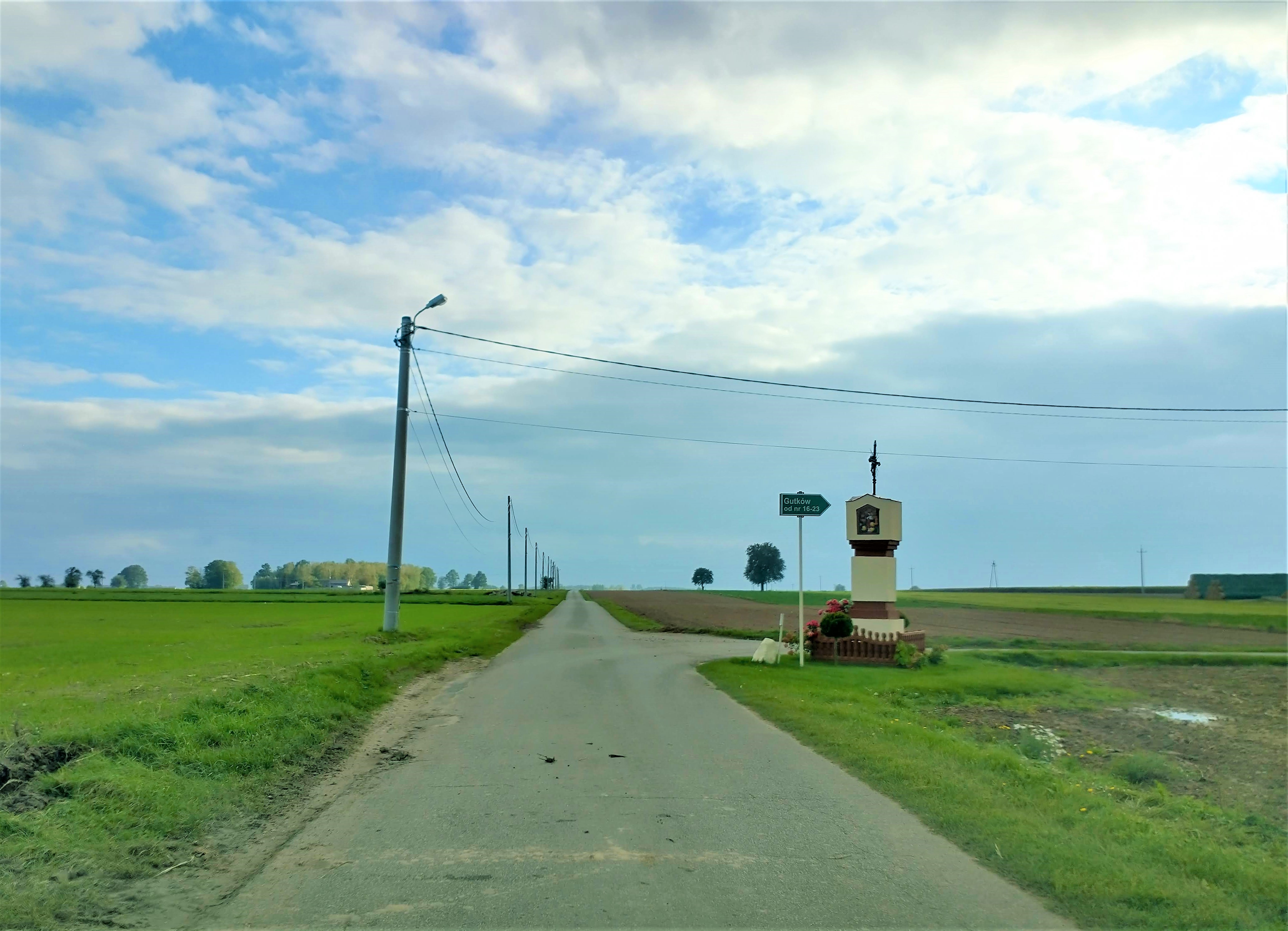

- Location within Poland
- Coordinates: 51°34′15″N 19°46′34″E
- Country: Poland
- Voivodeship: Łódź
- County: Tomaszów
- Gmina: Będków

Gutków [ˈɡutkuf] is a village in the administrative district of Gmina Będków, within Tomaszów County, Łódź Voivodeship, in central Poland.
