= Pogorzałe Ługi =

- Village
- Location within Poland
- Coordinates: 51°42′N 19°49′E
- Country: Poland
- Voivodeship: Łódź
- County: Tomaszów
- Gmina: Rokiciny
- Population: 142

Pogorzałe Ługi [pɔɡɔˈʐawɛ ˈwuɡi] is a village in the administrative district of Gmina Rokiciny, within Tomaszów County, Łódź Voivodeship, in central Poland.
