= Rokiciny-Kolonia =

- Village
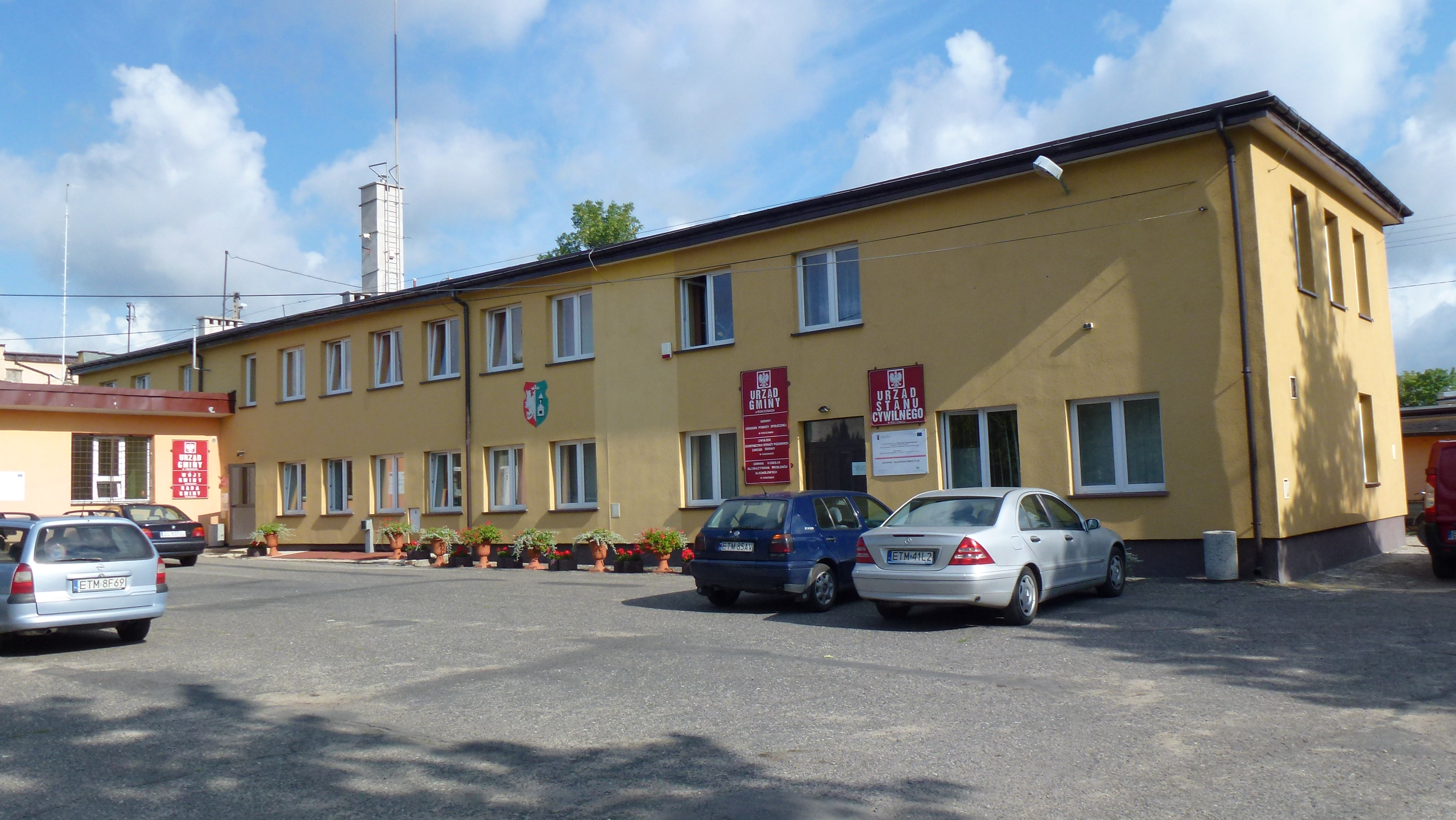
- Gmina administration building

- Location within Poland
- Coordinates: 51°39′53″N 19°46′51″E
- Country: Poland
- Voivodeship: Łódź
- County: Tomaszów
- Gmina: Rokiciny

Population
  - Total: 1,300

Rokiciny-Kolonia [rɔkiˈt͡ɕinɨ kɔˈlɔɲa] is a village in the administrative district of Gmina Rokiciny, within Tomaszów County, Łódź Voivodeship, in central Poland.
