= Dębniak, Gmina Ujazd =

Dębniak
- Village
- Location within Poland
- Coordinates: 51°33′24″N 19°55′47″E
- Country: Poland
- Voivodeship: Łódź
- County: Tomaszów
- Gmina: Ujazd

Dębniak [ˈdɛmbɲak] is a village in the administrative district of Gmina Ujazd, within Tomaszów County, Łódź Voivodeship, in central Poland.
