= Magdalenka =

Magdalenka may refer to the following places:

- Magdalenka, Kuyavian-Pomeranian Voivodeship (north-central Poland)
- Magdalenka, Piotrków County in Łódź Voivodeship (central Poland)
- Magdalenka, Gmina Będków in Łódź Voivodeship (central Poland)
- Magdalenka, Lublin Voivodeship (east Poland)
- Magdalenka, Masovian Voivodeship (east-central Poland)
