= Kalinów, Gmina Będków =

Kalinów
- Village
- Location within Poland
- Coordinates: 51°34′46″N 19°44′33″E
- Country: Poland
- Voivodeship: Łódź
- County: Tomaszów
- Gmina: Będków
- Population: 280

Kalinów [kaˈlinuf] is a village in the administrative district of Gmina Będków, within Tomaszów County, Łódź Voivodeship, in central Poland.
