= Powiat tomaszowski =

Powiat tomaszowski may refer to two counties (powiats) in Poland:

- Tomaszów County, Lublin Voivodeship (east Poland)
- Tomaszów County, Łódź Voivodeship (central Poland)
