= Agnopol =

- Village
- Location within Poland
- Coordinates: 51°40′N 20°1′E
- Country: Poland
- Voivodeship: Łódź
- County: Tomaszów
- Gmina: Budziszewice
- Population: 50

Agnopol [aɡˈnɔpɔl] is a village in the administrative district of Gmina Budziszewice, within Tomaszów County, Łódź Voivodeship, in central Poland.
