= Bielina =

- Village
- Location within Poland
- Coordinates: 51°34′10″N 19°54′37″E
- Country: Poland
- Voivodeship: Łódź
- County: Tomaszów
- Gmina: Ujazd

Bielina [bjɛˈlina] is a village in the administrative district of Gmina Ujazd, within Tomaszów County, Łódź Voivodeship, in central Poland.
