= Sokołówka =

Sokołówka may refer to the following places in Poland:

- Sokołówka, Lublin Voivodeship (east Poland)
- Sokołówka, Łódź Voivodeship (central Poland)
- Sokołówka, Otwock County in Masovian Voivodeship (east-central Poland)
- Sokołówka, Kalisz County in Greater Poland Voivodeship (west-central Poland)
- Sokołówka, Krotoszyn County in Greater Poland Voivodeship (west-central Poland)

Sokołówka is also the former Polish name for the village of Sokolivka, in Kosiv Raion, Ivano-Frankivsk Oblast, Ukraine
