= Zalesie, Gmina Budziszewice =

Zalesie
- Village
- Location within Poland
- Coordinates: 51°41′30″N 19°57′5″E
- Country: Poland
- Voivodeship: Łódź
- County: Tomaszów
- Gmina: Budziszewice

Zalesie [zaˈlɛɕɛ] is a village in the administrative district of Gmina Budziszewice, within Tomaszów County, Łódź Voivodeship, in central Poland.
