= Świniokierz Dworski =

- Village
- Location within Poland
- Coordinates: 51°42′N 20°0′E
- Country: Poland
- Voivodeship: Łódź
- County: Tomaszów
- Gmina: Żelechlinek

Świniokierz Dworski (Polish pronunciation: [ɕfiˈɲɔkʲɛʐ ˈdvɔrskʲi]) is a village in the administrative district of Gmina Żelechlinek, within Tomaszów County, Łódź Voivodeship, in central Poland.
