= Węgrzynowice-Modrzewie =

- Village
- Location within Poland
- Coordinates: 51°43′N 19°58′E
- Country: Poland
- Voivodeship: Łódź
- County: Tomaszów
- Gmina: Budziszewice

Węgrzynowice-Modrzewie (Polish pronunciation: [vɛŋɡʐɨnɔˈvit͡sɛ mɔdˈʐɛvjɛ]) is a village in the administrative district of Gmina Budziszewice, within Tomaszów County, Łódź Voivodeship, in central Poland.
