= Czerwonka, Łódź Voivodeship =

Czerwonka
- Village
- Location within Poland
- Coordinates: 51°42′N 20°8′E
- Country: Poland
- Voivodeship: Łódź
- County: Tomaszów
- Gmina: Żelechlinek

Czerwonka [t͡ʂɛrˈvɔnka] is a village in the administrative district of Gmina Żelechlinek, within Tomaszów County, Łódź Voivodeship, in central Poland.
