= Rudnik, Łódź Voivodeship =

Rudnik
- Village
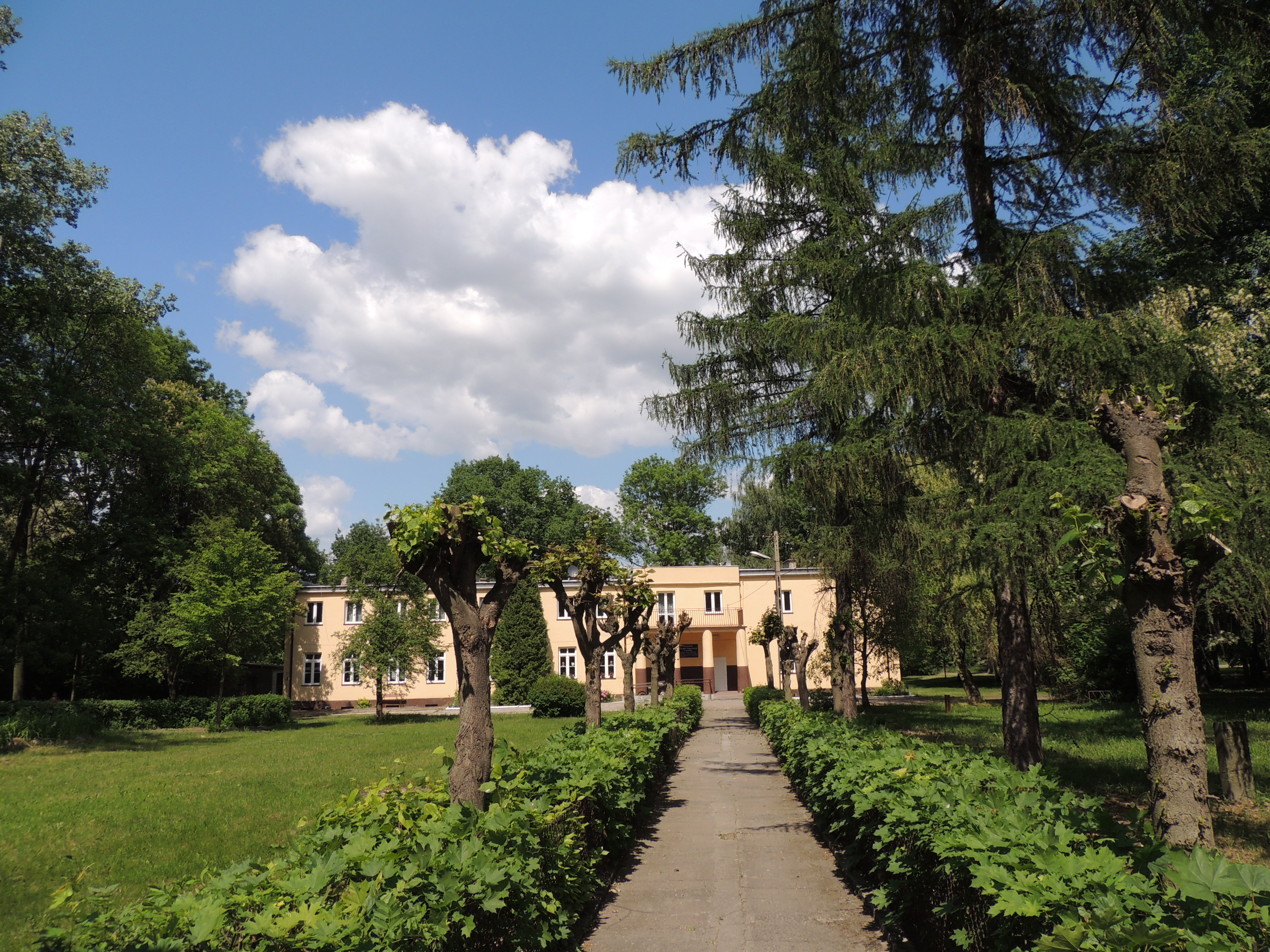
- Park

- Location within Poland
- Coordinates: 51°35′2″N 19°48′56″E
- Country: Poland
- Voivodeship: Łódź
- County: Tomaszów
- Gmina: Będków

Rudnik (Polish pronunciation: [ˈrudɲik]) is a village in the administrative district of Gmina Będków, within Tomaszów County, Łódź Voivodeship, in central Poland.
