= Staropole, Łódź Voivodeship =

Staropole
- Village
- Location within Poland
- Coordinates: 51°41′27″N 20°4′33″E
- Country: Poland
- Voivodeship: Łódź
- County: Tomaszów
- Gmina: Żelechlinek

Staropole [starɔˈpɔlɛ] is a village in the administrative district of Gmina Żelechlinek, in Tomaszów County, Łódź Voivodeship in central Poland, approximately 5 km (3 mi) south-east of Żelechlinek, 20 km (12 mi) north of Tomaszów Mazowiecki, and 44 km (27 mi) east of the regional capital Łódź.
