= Antolin, Łódź Voivodeship =

Antolin
- Village
- Location within Poland
- Coordinates: 51°39′56″N 19°57′9″E
- Country: Poland
- Voivodeship: Łódź
- County: Tomaszów
- Gmina: Budziszewice

Antolin [anˈtɔlin] is a village in the administrative district of Gmina Budziszewice, within Tomaszów County, Łódź Voivodeship, in central Poland.
