= Kopiec, Gmina Żelechlinek =

Kopiec
- Village
- Location within Poland
- Coordinates: 51°44′30″N 20°1′36″E
- Country: Poland
- Voivodeship: Łódź
- County: Tomaszów
- Gmina: Żelechlinek

Kopiec [ˈkɔpjɛt͡s] is a village in the administrative district of Gmina Żelechlinek, within Tomaszów County, Łódź Voivodeship, in central Poland.
