= Modrzewek, Gmina Żelechlinek =

Modrzewek
- Village
- Location within Poland
- Coordinates: 51°43′N 19°59′E
- Country: Poland
- Voivodeship: Łódź
- County: Tomaszów
- Gmina: Żelechlinek

Modrzewek (Polish pronunciation: [mɔdˈʐɛvɛk]) is a village in the administrative district of Gmina Żelechlinek, within Tomaszów County, Łódź Voivodeship, in central Poland.
