= Naropna =

- Village
- Location within Poland
- Coordinates: 51°43′56″N 20°2′36″E
- Country: Poland
- Voivodeship: Łódź
- County: Tomaszów
- Gmina: Żelechlinek

Naropna [naˈrɔpna] is a village in the administrative district of Gmina Żelechlinek, within Tomaszów County, Łódź Voivodeship, in central Poland.
