= Wykno, Gmina Będków =

Wykno
- Village
- Location within Poland
- Coordinates: 51°35′7″N 19°47′38″E
- Country: Poland
- Voivodeship: Łódź
- County: Tomaszów
- Gmina: Będków

Wykno [ˈvɨknɔ] is a village in the administrative district of Gmina Będków, within Tomaszów County, Łódź Voivodeship, in central Poland.
