= Wygoda, Tomaszów County =

Wygoda
- Village
- Location within Poland
- Coordinates: 51°34′16″N 19°54′17″E
- Country: Poland
- Voivodeship: Łódź
- County: Tomaszów
- Gmina: Ujazd
- Population: 70

Wygoda [vɨˈɡɔda] is a village in the administrative district of Gmina Ujazd, within Tomaszów County, Łódź Voivodeship, in central Poland.
