= Łaznowska Wola =

- Village
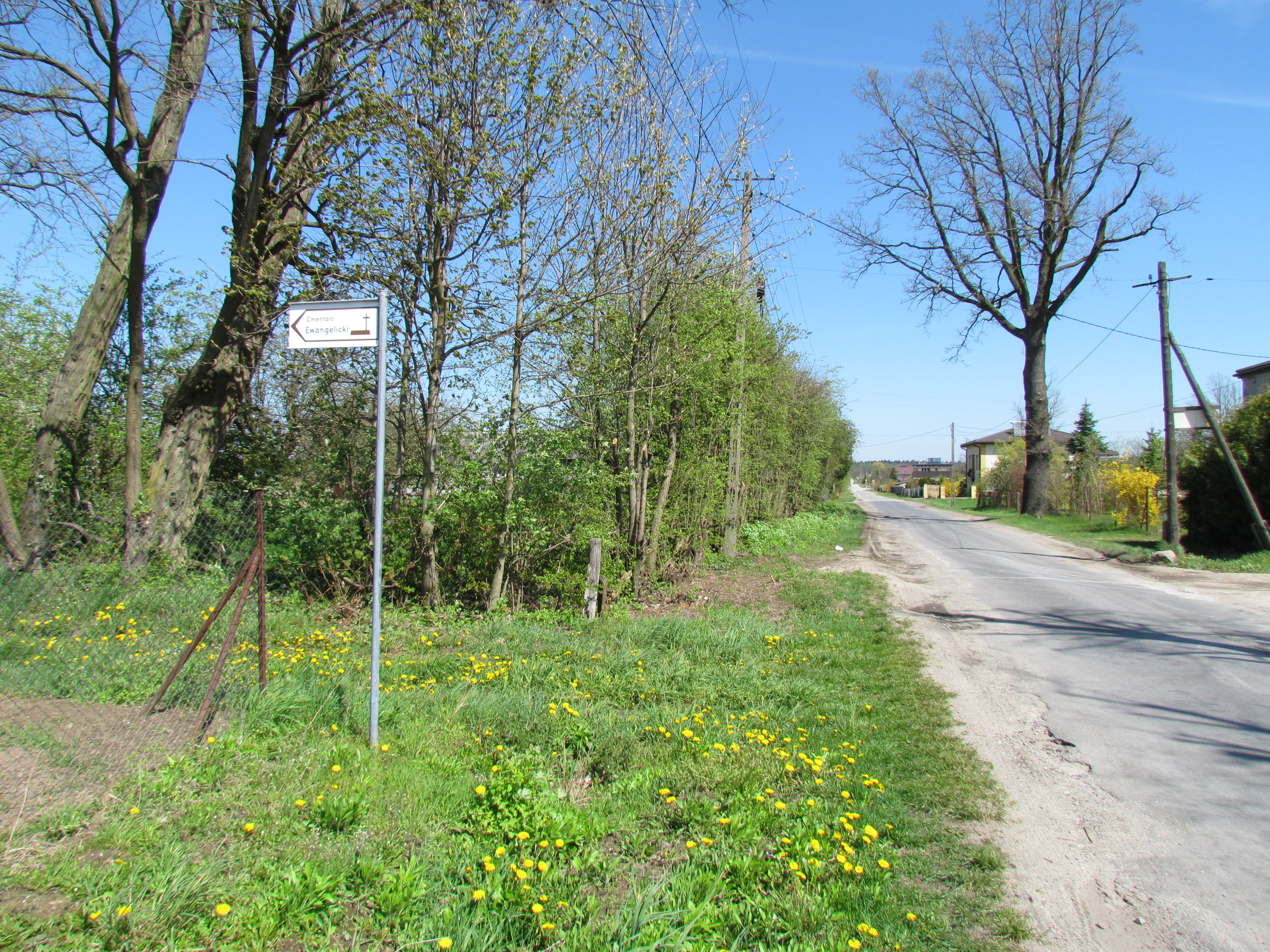

- Location within Poland
- Coordinates: 51°39′N 19°45′E
- Country: Poland
- Voivodeship: Łódź
- County: Tomaszów
- Gmina: Rokiciny

Łaznowska Wola [wazˈnɔfska ˈvɔla] (German Grömbach) is a village in the administrative district of Gmina Rokiciny, within Tomaszów County, Łódź Voivodeship, in central Poland.

With the second partition of Poland in 1793, the area around Lodz became part of Prussia and Friedrich Wilhelm III. settled German colonists from 1800.

The new settlement, which bore the German name Grömbach, was founded in 1800 by Swabian colonists from the area around Grömbach in Wuerttemberg.
