= Łaznów =

- Village
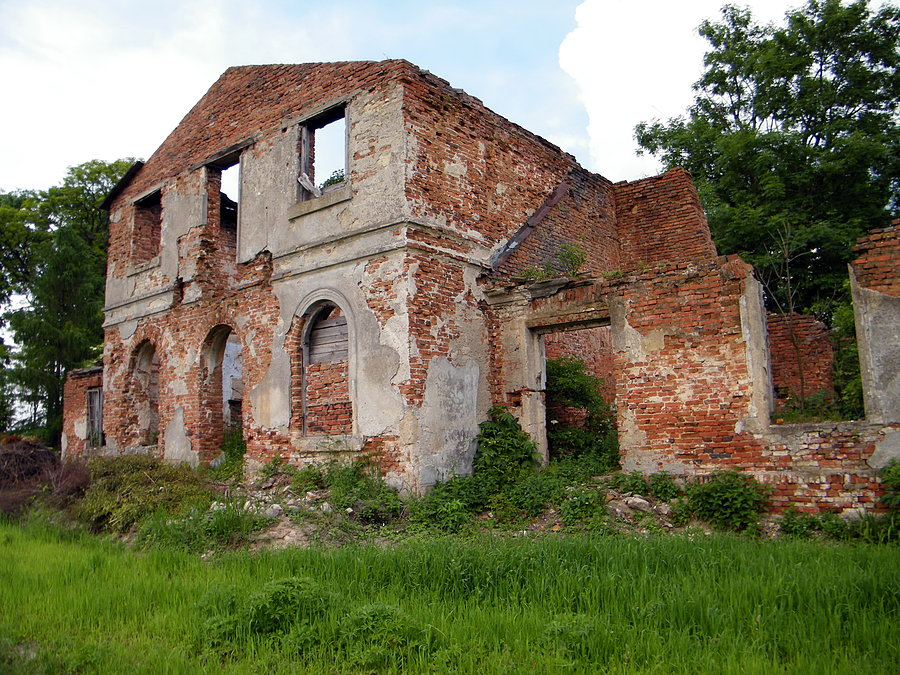
- Manor ruins

- Location within Poland
- Coordinates: 51°38′N 19°48′E
- Country: Poland
- Voivodeship: Łódź
- County: Tomaszów
- Gmina: Rokiciny

Łaznów [ˈwaznuf] is a village in the administrative district of Gmina Rokiciny, within Tomaszów County, Łódź Voivodeship, in central Poland.
