= Buków, Łódź Voivodeship =

Buków
- Village
- Location within Poland
- Coordinates: 51°36′51″N 19°51′39″E
- Country: Poland
- Voivodeship: Łódź
- County: Tomaszów
- Gmina: Ujazd

Buków [ˈbukuf] is a village in the administrative district of Gmina Ujazd, within Tomaszów County, Łódź Voivodeship, in central Poland.
