= Budki Łochowskie =

Village in Gmina Żelechlinek, Poland

- Village
- Location within Poland
- Coordinates: 51°44′11″N 20°04′51″E
- Country: Poland
- Voivodeship: Łódź
- County: Tomaszów
- Gmina: Żelechlinek

Budki Łochowskie [ˈbutki wɔˈxɔfskʲɛ] is a village in the administrative district of Gmina Żelechlinek, within Tomaszów County, Łódź Voivodeship, in central Poland.
