= Maksymilianów, Gmina Rokiciny =

Maksymilianów
- Village
- Location within Poland
- Coordinates: 51°39′14″N 19°50′54″E
- Country: Poland
- Voivodeship: Łódź
- County: Tomaszów
- Gmina: Rokiciny

Maksymilianów [maksɨmiˈljanuf] is a village in the administrative district of Gmina Rokiciny, within Tomaszów County, Łódź Voivodeship, in central Poland.
