= Osiedle Niewiadów =

- Village
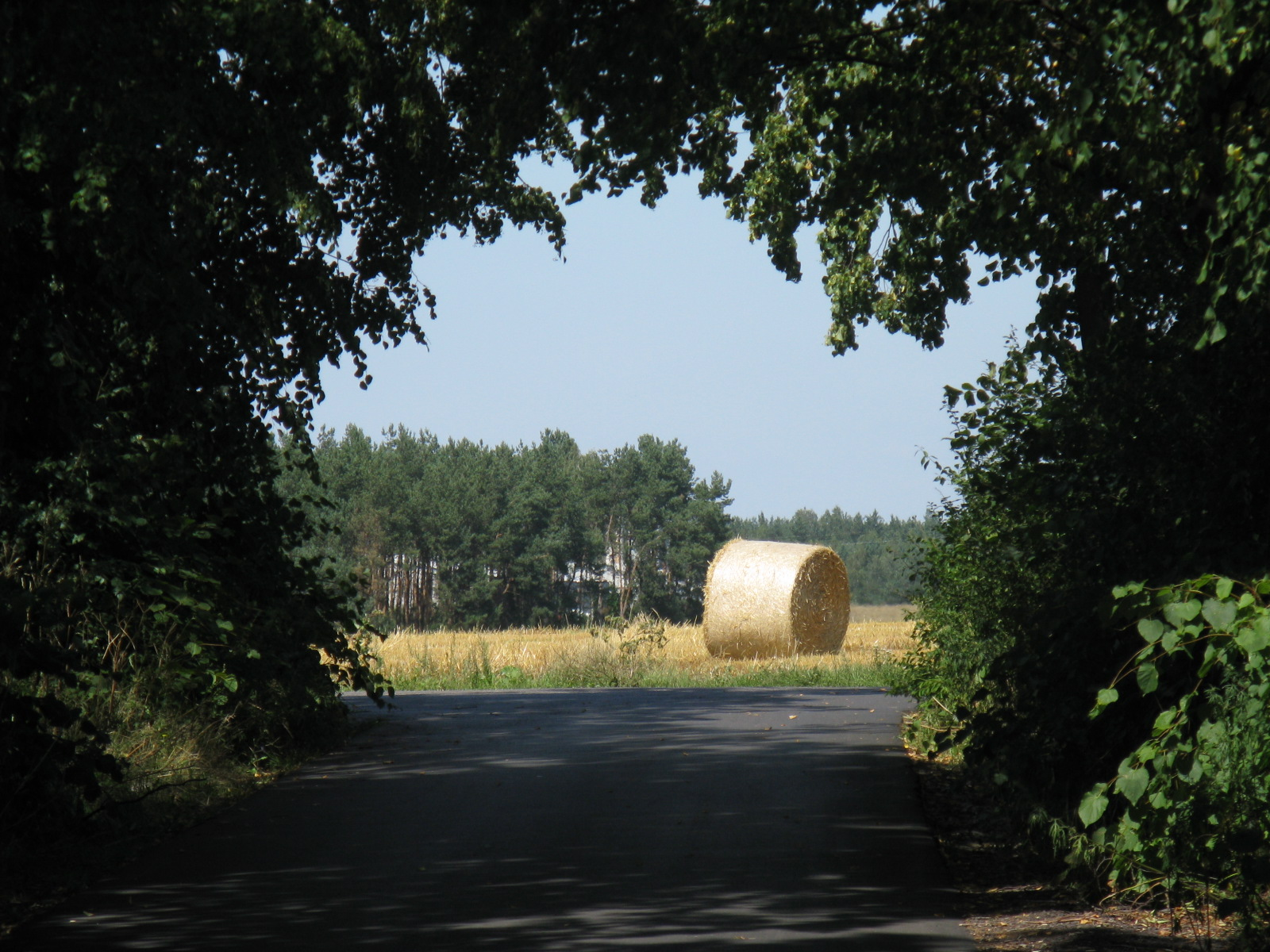

- Location within Poland
- Coordinates: 51°36′51″N 19°55′26″E
- Country: Poland
- Voivodeship: Łódź
- County: Tomaszów
- Gmina: Ujazd

Osiedle Niewiadów [ɔˈɕɛdlɛ ɲɛˈvjaduf] is a village in the administrative district of Gmina Ujazd, within Tomaszów County, Łódź Voivodeship, in central Poland.
