= Przesiadłów =

- Village
- Location within Poland
- Coordinates: 51°36′N 19°58′E
- Country: Poland
- Voivodeship: Łódź
- County: Tomaszów
- Gmina: Ujazd
- Time zone: UTC+1 (CET)
  - Summer (DST): UTC+2 (CEST)
- Vehicle registration: ETM

Przesiadłów [pʂɛˈɕadwuf] is a village in the administrative district of Gmina Ujazd, within Tomaszów County, Łódź Voivodeship, in central Poland.

== History ==
Historical population
Year	Pop.	±%
1827	70	—
1921	285	+307.1%

According to the 1921 census, the population of Przesiadłów was entirely Polish by nationality and Roman Catholic by confession.

During the German occupation of Poland (World War II), the occupiers operated a forced labour camp for Poles and Jews at a local sawmill.
