= Chociszew =

Chociszew may refer to the following places:

- Chociszew, Sieradz County in Łódź Voivodeship (central Poland)
- Chociszew, Gmina Żelechlinek, Tomaszów County in Łódź Voivodeship (central Poland)
- Chociszew, Zgierz County in Łódź Voivodeship (central Poland)
