= Stary Józefów, Gmina Budziszewice =

Stary Józefów
- Village
- Location within Poland
- Coordinates: 51°40′35″N 19°58′6″E
- Country: Poland
- Voivodeship: Łódź
- County: Tomaszów
- Gmina: Budziszewice

Stary Józefów (Polish pronunciation: [ˈstarɨ juˈzɛfuf]) is a village in the administrative district of Gmina Budziszewice, within Tomaszów County, Łódź Voivodeship, in central Poland.
