= Reginów =

- Village
- Location within Poland
- Coordinates: 51°40′3″N 19°50′16″E
- Country: Poland
- Voivodeship: Łódź
- County: Tomaszów
- Gmina: Rokiciny
- Population: 60

Reginów [rɛˈɡinuf] is a village in the administrative district of Gmina Rokiciny, within Tomaszów County, Łódź Voivodeship, in central Poland.
