= Walentynów, Gmina Budziszewice =

Walentynów
- Village
- Location within Poland
- Coordinates: 51°40′N 20°4′E
- Country: Poland
- Voivodeship: Łódź
- County: Tomaszów
- Gmina: Budziszewice

Walentynów [valɛnˈtɨnuf] is a village in the administrative district of Gmina Budziszewice, within Tomaszów County, Łódź Voivodeship, in central Poland.
