= Nowe Chrusty =

- Village
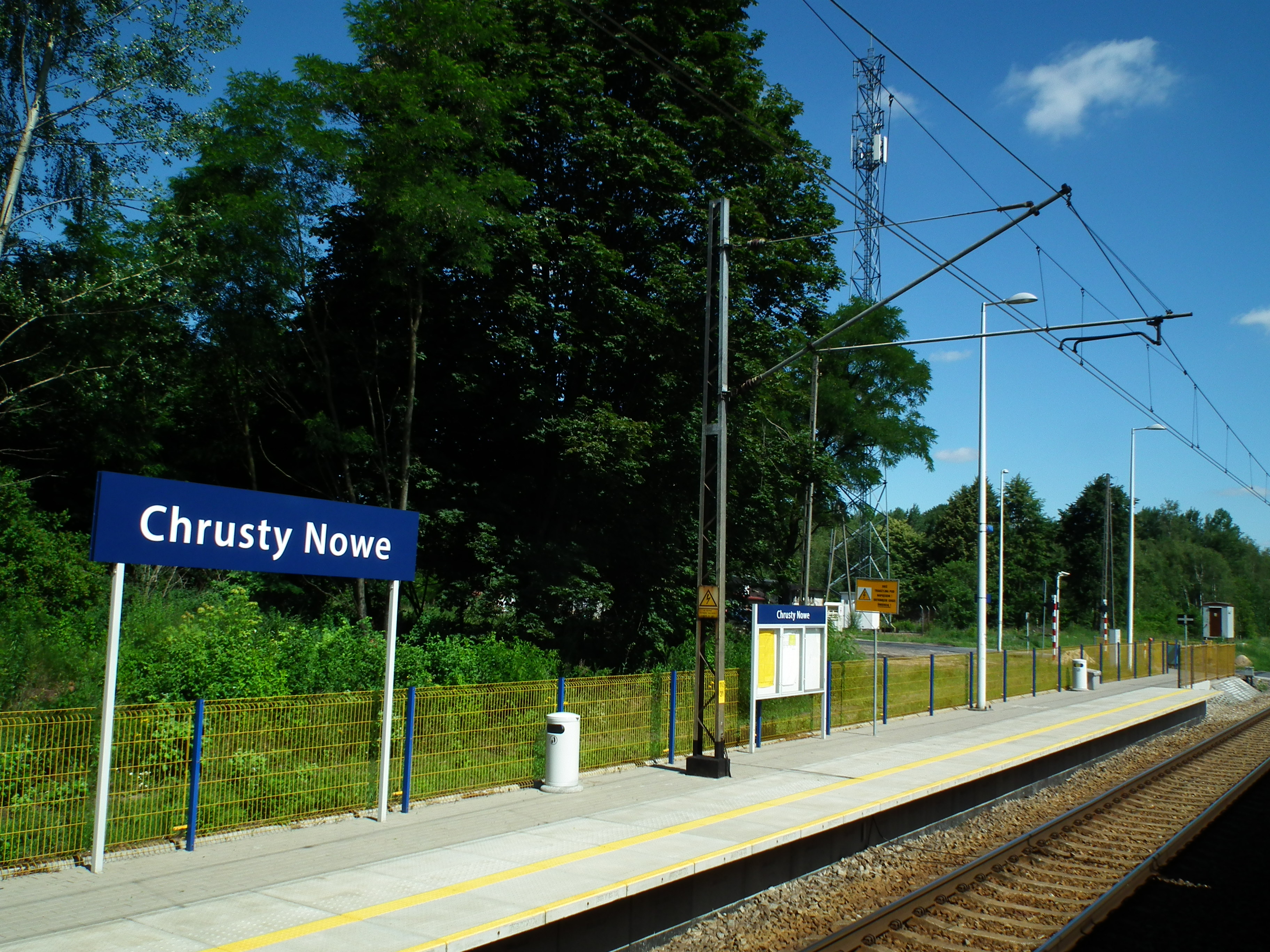
- Railway stop

- Location within Poland
- Coordinates: 51°41′47″N 19°47′28″E
- Country: Poland
- Voivodeship: Łódź
- County: Tomaszów
- Gmina: Rokiciny

Nowe Chrusty [ˈnɔvɛ ˈxrustɨ] is a village in the administrative district of Gmina Rokiciny, within Tomaszów County, Łódź Voivodeship, in central Poland.
