= Wola Naropińska =

- Village
- Location within Poland
- Coordinates: 51°44′N 20°4′E
- Country: Poland
- Voivodeship: Łódź
- County: Tomaszów
- Gmina: Żelechlinek
- Population: 70

Wola Naropińska [ˈvɔla narɔˈpiɲska] is a village in the administrative district of Gmina Żelechlinek, within Tomaszów County, Łódź Voivodeship, in central Poland.
