= Radwanka =

- Village
- Location within Poland
- Coordinates: 51°42′N 20°7′E
- Country: Poland
- Voivodeship: Łódź
- County: Tomaszów
- Gmina: Żelechlinek

Radwanka (Polish pronunciation: [raˈdvaŋka]) is a village in the administrative district of Gmina Żelechlinek, within Tomaszów County, Łódź Voivodeship, in central Poland.
