= Tomaszów County =

Tomaszów County may refer to two counties (powiats) in Poland which share the original name powiat tomaszowski ("powiat of Tomaszów"):

- Tomaszów County, Lublin Voivodeship (east Poland)
- Tomaszów County, Łódź Voivodeship (central Poland)
