= Władysławów, Gmina Żelechlinek =

Władysławów
- Village
- Location within Poland
- Coordinates: 51°45′27″N 20°2′16″E
- Country: Poland
- Voivodeship: Łódź
- County: Tomaszów
- Gmina: Żelechlinek

Władysławów [vwadɨˈswavuf] is a village in the administrative district of Gmina Żelechlinek, within Tomaszów County, Łódź Voivodeship, in central Poland.
