= Julianów, Gmina Żelechlinek =

Julianów
- Village
- Location within Poland
- Coordinates: 51°42′3″N 20°4′51″E
- Country: Poland
- Voivodeship: Łódź
- County: Tomaszów
- Gmina: Żelechlinek

Julianów [juˈljanuf] is a village in the administrative district of Gmina Żelechlinek, within Tomaszów County, Łódź Voivodeship, in central Poland.
