= Brzostow =

Brzostow may refer to:

- Brzostów, west Poland
- Brzóstów, central Poland
