= Albertów, Gmina Rokiciny =

Albertów
- Village
- Location within Poland
- Coordinates: 51°40′37″N 19°49′17″E
- Country: Poland
- Voivodeship: Łódź
- County: Tomaszów
- Gmina: Rokiciny

Albertów [alˈbɛrtuf] is a village in the administrative district of Gmina Rokiciny, within Tomaszów County, Łódź Voivodeship, in central Poland.
