= Sangrodz =

- Village
- Location within Poland
- Coordinates: 51°34′27″N 19°56′48″E
- Country: Poland
- Voivodeship: Łódź
- County: Tomaszów
- Gmina: Ujazd

Sangrodz [ˈsaŋɡrɔt͡s] is a village in the administrative district of Gmina Ujazd, within Tomaszów County, Łódź Voivodeship, in central Poland.
