= Ojrzanów =

Ojrzanów may refer to:

- Ojrzanów, Łódź Voivodeship, Poland
- Ojrzanów, Masovian Voivodeship, Poland
