= Cisów =

Cisów may refer to the following places in Poland:

- Cisów, Lower Silesian Voivodeship (south-west Poland)
- Cisów, Podlaskie Voivodeship (north-east Poland)
- Cisów, Łódź Voivodeship (central Poland)
- Cisów, Świętokrzyskie Voivodeship (south-central Poland)
- Cisów, Lubusz Voivodeship (west Poland)
