= Janów, Gmina Żelechlinek =

Janów
- Village
- Location within Poland
- Coordinates: 51°44′13″N 20°4′21″E
- Country: Poland
- Voivodeship: Łódź
- County: Tomaszów
- Gmina: Żelechlinek

Janów [ˈjanuf] is a village in the administrative district of Gmina Żelechlinek, within Tomaszów County, Łódź Voivodeship, in central Poland.
