= Nowe Byliny =

- Village
- Location within Poland
- Coordinates: 51°43′18″N 20°8′55″E
- Country: Poland
- Voivodeship: Łódź
- County: Tomaszów
- Gmina: Żelechlinek

Nowe Byliny [ˈnɔvɛ bɨˈlinɨ] is a village in the administrative district of Gmina Żelechlinek, within Tomaszów County, Łódź Voivodeship, in central Poland.
