= Czechowice, Łódź Voivodeship =

Czechowice
- Village
- Location within Poland
- Coordinates: 51°43′27″N 20°2′23″E
- Country: Poland
- Voivodeship: Łódź
- County: Tomaszów
- Gmina: Żelechlinek

Czechowice [t͡ʂɛxɔˈvit͡sɛ] is a village in the administrative district of Gmina Żelechlinek, within Tomaszów County, Łódź Voivodeship, in central Poland.
