= Nowiny, Gmina Będków =

Nowiny
- Village
- Location within Poland
- Coordinates: 51°36′24″N 19°46′26″E
- Country: Poland
- Voivodeship: Łódź
- County: Tomaszów
- Gmina: Będków

Nowiny [nɔˈvinɨ] is a village in the administrative district of Gmina Będków, within Tomaszów County, Łódź Voivodeship, in central Poland.
