= Nowiny, Gmina Żelechlinek =

Nowiny
- Village
- Location within Poland
- Coordinates: 51°40′52″N 20°1′9″E
- Country: Poland
- Voivodeship: Łódź
- County: Tomaszów
- Gmina: Żelechlinek

Nowiny [nɔˈvinɨ] is a village in the administrative district of Gmina Żelechlinek, within Tomaszów County, Łódź Voivodeship, in central Poland.
