= Wólka Krzykowska =

- Village
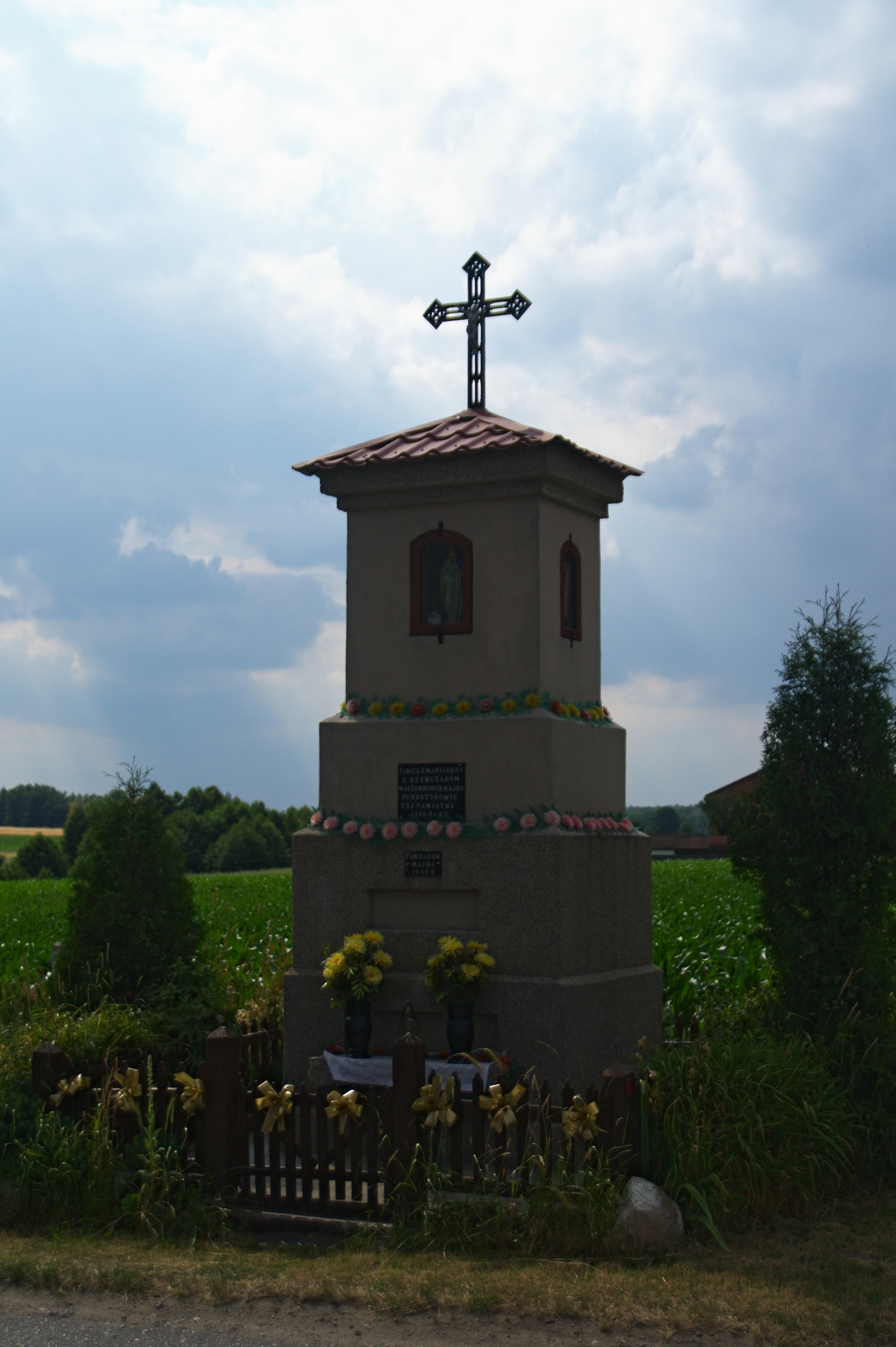

- Location within Poland
- Coordinates: 51°34′N 19°53′E
- Country: Poland
- Voivodeship: Łódź
- County: Tomaszów
- Gmina: Ujazd

Wólka Krzykowska [ˈvulka kʂɨˈkɔfska] is a village in the administrative district of Gmina Ujazd, within Tomaszów County, Łódź Voivodeship, in central Poland.
