= Nepomucenów, Łódź Voivodeship =

Nepomucenów
- Village
- Location within Poland
- Coordinates: 51°39′34″N 19°59′29″E
- Country: Poland
- Voivodeship: Łódź
- County: Tomaszów
- Gmina: Budziszewice

Nepomucenów [nɛpɔmuˈt͡sɛnuf] is a village in the administrative district of Gmina Budziszewice, within Tomaszów County, Łódź Voivodeship, in central Poland.
