= Dzielnica (disambiguation) =

A dzielnica is a subdivision of a Polish town (and historically a subdivision of the Polish kingdom).

Dzielnica may also refer to:

- Dzielnica, Gmina Czerniewice in Łódź Voivodeship (central Poland)
- Dzielnica, Gmina Żelechlinek in Łódź Voivodeship (central Poland)
- Dzielnica, Opole Voivodeship (south-west Poland)
