= Kolonia Dębniak =

- Village
- Location within Poland
- Coordinates: 51°37′0″N 19°51′0″E
- Country: Poland
- Voivodeship: Łódź
- County: Tomaszów
- Gmina: Ujazd
- Population: 120

Kolonia Dębniak [kɔˈlɔɲa ˈdɛmbɲak] is a village in the administrative district of Gmina Ujazd, within Tomaszów County, Łódź Voivodeship, in central Poland.
