= Drzazgowa Wola =

- Village
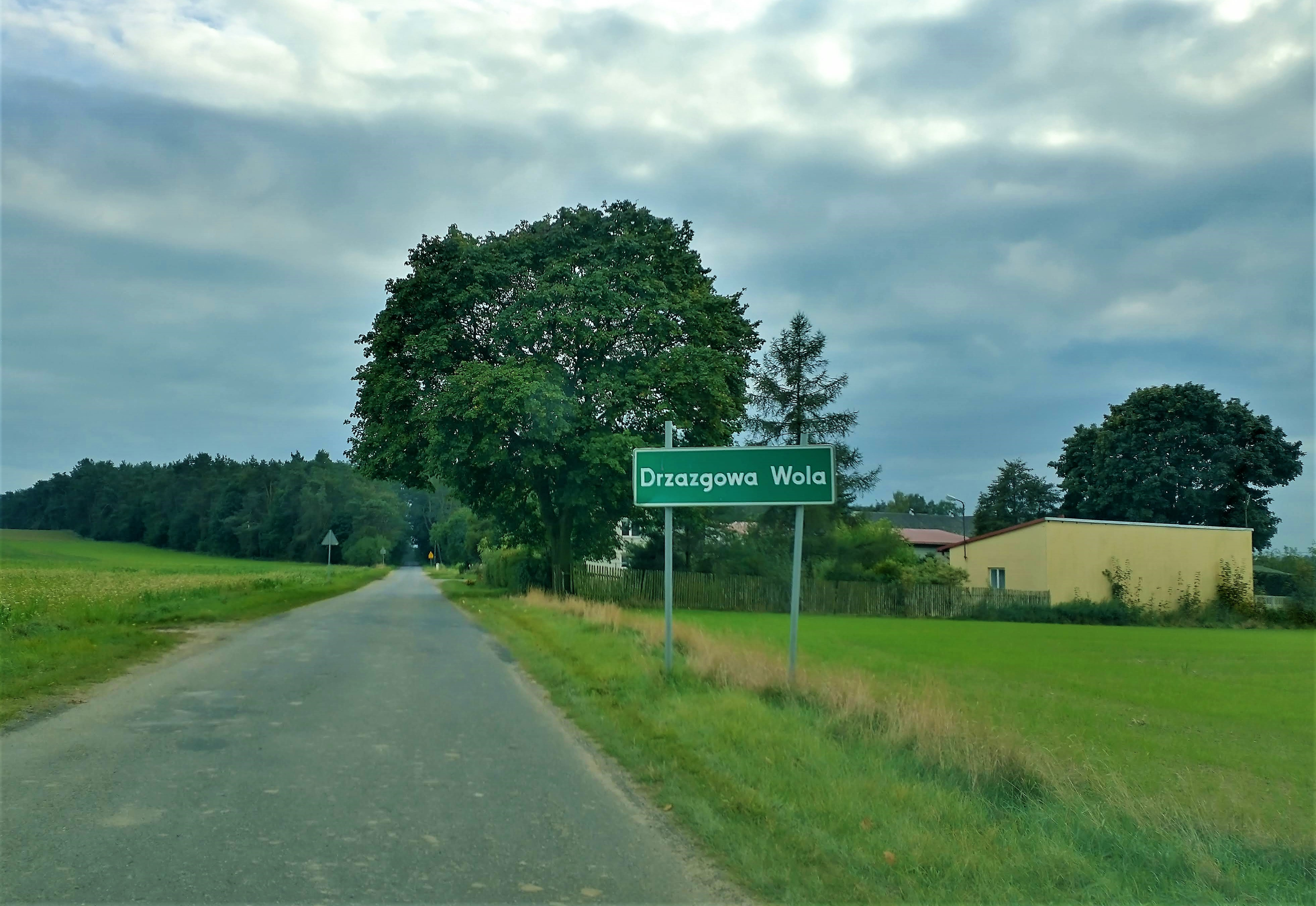

- Location within Poland
- Coordinates: 51°33′N 19°48′E
- Country: Poland
- Voivodeship: Łódź
- County: Tomaszów
- Gmina: Będków

Drzazgowa Wola [dʐazˈɡɔva ˈvɔla] is a village in the administrative district of Gmina Będków, within Tomaszów County, Łódź Voivodeship, in central Poland.
