= Prażki =

- Village
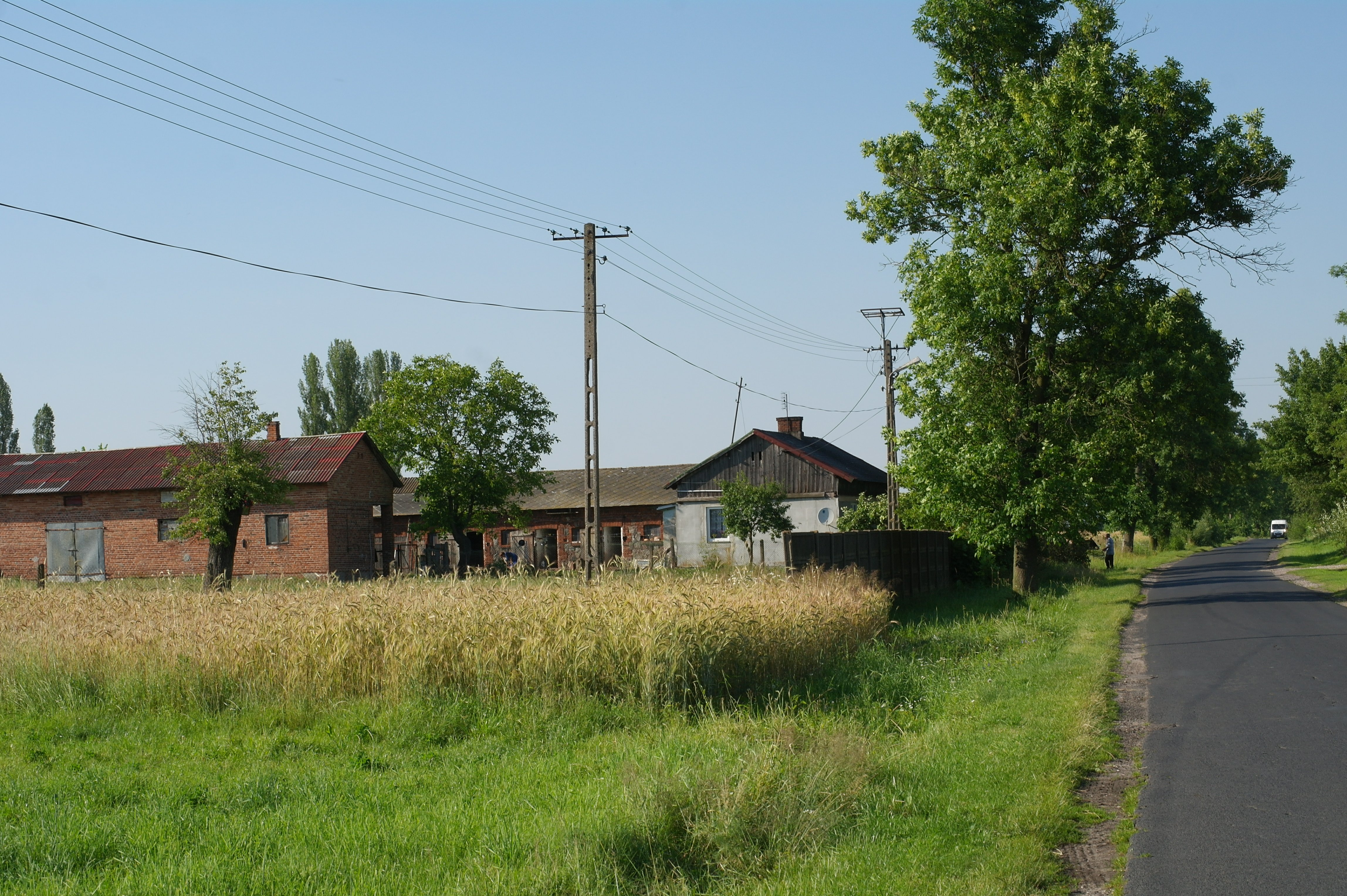

- Location within Poland
- Coordinates: 51°36′12″N 19°44′00″E
- Country: Poland
- Voivodeship: Łódź
- County: Tomaszów
- Gmina: Będków

Prażki [ˈpraʂki] is a village in the administrative district of Gmina Będków, within Tomaszów County, Łódź Voivodeship, in central Poland.
