= Maksymów, Tomaszów County =

Maksymów
- Village
- Location within Poland
- Coordinates: 51°34′34″N 19°52′59″E
- Country: Poland
- Voivodeship: Łódź
- County: Tomaszów
- Gmina: Ujazd

Maksymów [makˈsɨmuf] is a village in the administrative district of Gmina Ujazd, within Tomaszów County, Łódź Voivodeship, in central Poland.
