= Michałów, Gmina Rokiciny =

Michałów
- Village
- Location within Poland
- Coordinates: 51°37′59″N 19°45′8″E
- Country: Poland
- Voivodeship: Łódź
- County: Tomaszów
- Gmina: Rokiciny

Michałów [miˈxawuf] is a village in the administrative district of Gmina Rokiciny, within Tomaszów County, Łódź Voivodeship, in central Poland.
