= Staropole =

Staropole may refer to the following places:

- Staropole, Łódź Voivodeship (central Poland)
- Staropole, Lubusz Voivodeship (west Poland)
- Staropole, Silesian Voivodeship (south Poland)
