= Gmina Ujazd, Łódź Voivodeship =

Gmina Ujazd Ujazd Commune
- Gmina
- Flag Coat of arms
- Interactive map of Gmina Ujazd
- Coordinates (Ujazd): 51°35′40″N 19°55′37″E
- Country: Poland
- Voivodeship: Łódź
- County: Tomaszów
- Seat: Ujazd

Area
  - Total: 96.96 km^{2} (37.44 sq mi)

Population (2006)
  - Total: 7,747
  - Density: 79.90/km^{2} (206.9/sq mi)

Gmina Ujazd is a rural gmina (administrative district) in Tomaszów County, Łódź Voivodeship, in central Poland. Its seat is the village of Ujazd, which lies approximately 11 kilometres (7 mi) north-west of Tomaszów Mazowiecki and 39 km (24 mi) south-east of the regional capital Łódź.

The gmina covers an area of 96.96 square kilometres (37.4 sq mi), and as of 2006 its total population is 7,747.

== Villages ==
Gmina Ujazd contains the villages and settlements of Aleksandrów, Bielina, Bronisławów, Buków, Ciosny, Dębniak, Helenów, Józefin, Kolonia Dębniak, Łączkowice, Lipianki, Łominy, Maksymów, Marszew, Młynek, Niewiadów, Ojrzanów, Olszowa, Osiedle Niewiadów, Przesiadłów, Sangrodz, Skrzynki, Stasiolas, Szymanów, Teklów, Tobiasze, Ujazd, Wólka Krzykowska, Wygoda, Wykno and Zaosie.

== Neighbouring gminas ==
Gmina Ujazd is bordered by the gminas of Będków, Budziszewice, Koluszki, Lubochnia, Rokiciny, Tomaszów Mazowiecki and Wolbórz.
