= Szymanów, Łódź Voivodeship =

Szymanów
- Village
- Location within Poland
- Coordinates: 51°37′24″N 19°54′31″E
- Country: Poland
- Voivodeship: Łódź
- County: Tomaszów
- Gmina: Ujazd
- Population: 50

Szymanów (Polish pronunciation: [ʂɨˈmanuf]) is a village in the administrative district of Gmina Ujazd, within Tomaszów County, Łódź Voivodeship, in central Poland.
