= Teklin, Gmina Żelechlinek =

Teklin
- Village
- Location within Poland
- Coordinates: 51°43′29″N 20°6′38″E
- Country: Poland
- Voivodeship: Łódź
- County: Tomaszów
- Gmina: Żelechlinek

Teklin [ˈtɛklin] is a village in the administrative district of Gmina Żelechlinek, within Tomaszów County, Łódź Voivodeship, in central Poland.
