= Będków, Gmina Będków =

Będków
- Village
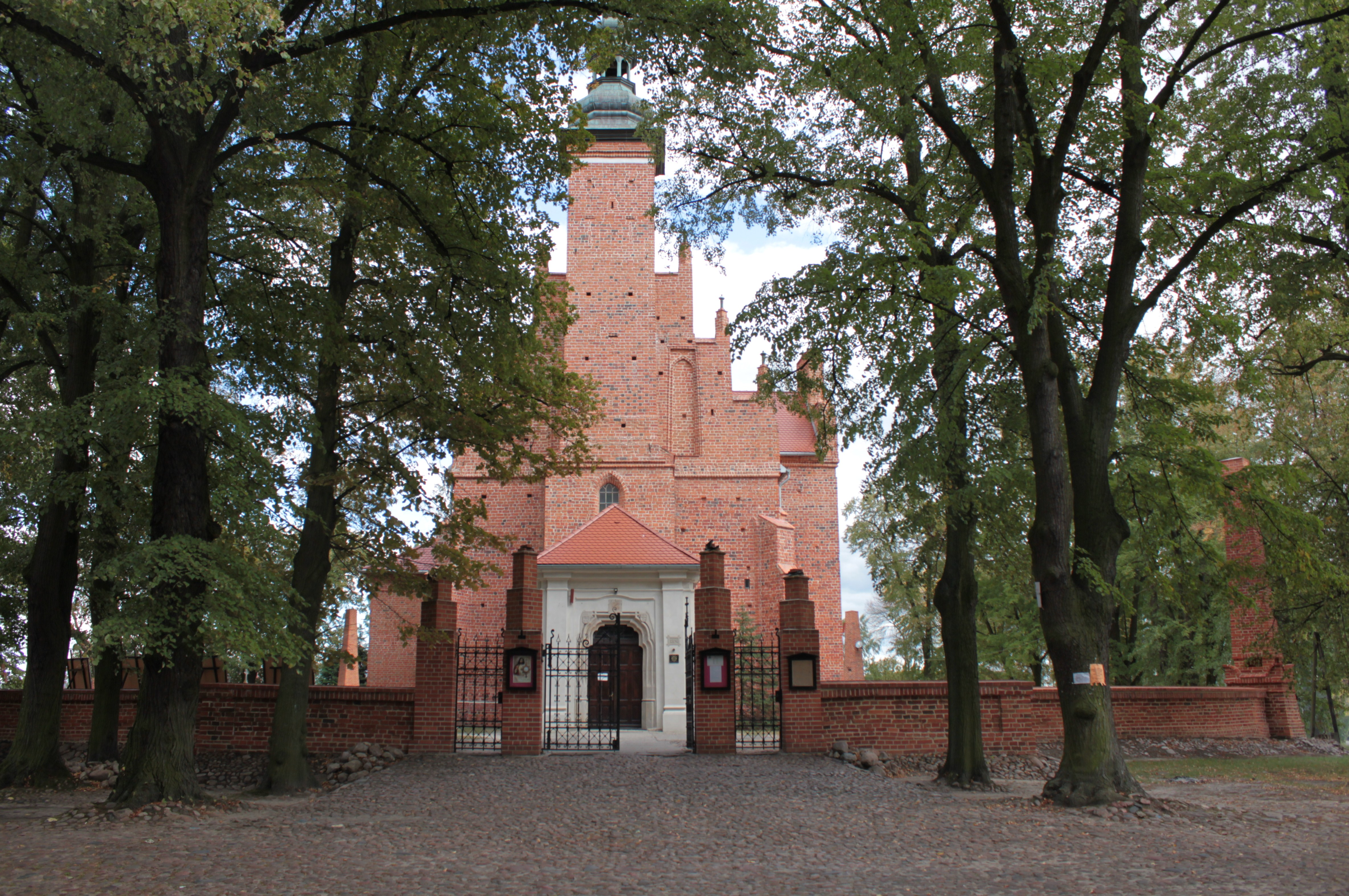
- Church of the Nativity of the Virgin Mary in Będków

- Location within Poland
- Coordinates: 51°35′14″N 19°44′53″E
- Country: Poland
- Voivodeship: Łódź
- County: Tomaszów
- Gmina: Będków

Population
  - Total: 550
- Time zone: UTC+1 (CET)
  - Summer (DST): UTC+2 (CEST)
- Vehicle registration: ETM

Będków [ˈbɛntkuf] is a village in Tomaszów County, Łódź Voivodeship, in central Poland. It is the seat of the gmina (administrative district) called Gmina Będków. It is located in Łęczyca Land.

It was a private town, administratively located in the Brzeziny County in the Łęczyca Voivodeship in the Greater Poland Province of the Kingdom of Poland.
