= Sokołówka, Łódź Voivodeship =

Sokołówka
- Village
- Location within Poland
- Coordinates: 51°42′32″N 20°4′20″E
- Country: Poland
- Voivodeship: Łódź
- County: Tomaszów
- Gmina: Żelechlinek

Sokołówka [sɔkɔˈwufka] is a village in the administrative district of Gmina Żelechlinek, within Tomaszów County, Łódź Voivodeship, in central Poland.
