= Budziszewice, Łódź Voivodeship =

Budziszewice
- Village
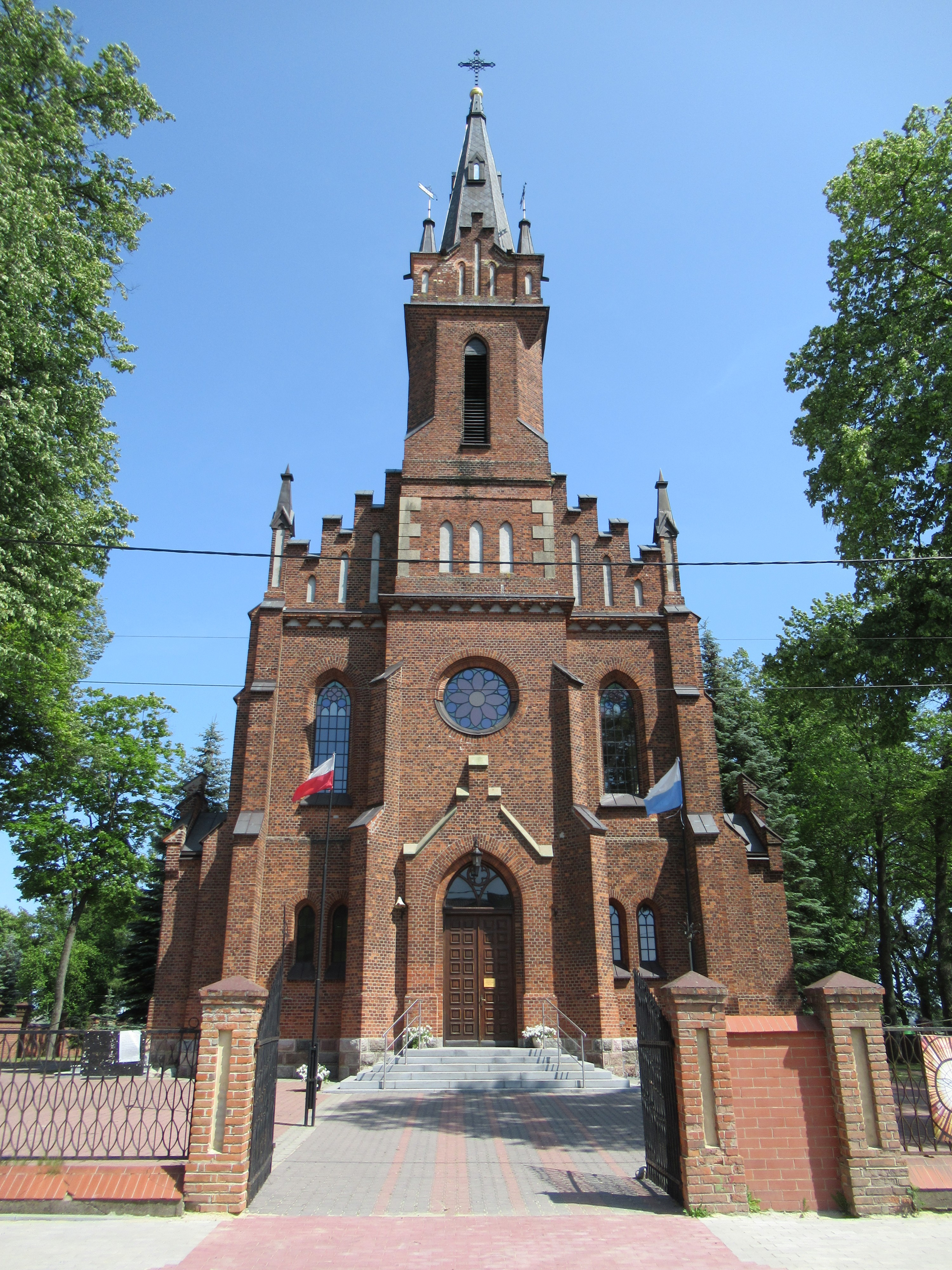
- Church of the Transfiguration

- Location within Poland
- Coordinates: 51°40′9″N 19°56′15″E
- Country: Poland
- Voivodeship: Łódź
- County: Tomaszów
- Gmina: Budziszewice

Population
  - Total: 880
- Time zone: UTC+1 (CET)
  - Summer (DST): UTC+2 (CEST)
- Vehicle registration: ETM

Budziszewice [bud͡ʑiʂɛˈvit͡sɛ] is a village in Tomaszów County, Łódź Voivodeship, in central Poland. It is the seat of the gmina (administrative district) called Gmina Budziszewice.

Budziszewice was a royal town of Poland, administratively located in the Rawa County in the Rawa Voivodeship in the Greater Poland Province.
