= Rzeczków, Gmina Będków =

Rzeczków
- Village
- Location within Poland
- Coordinates: 51°33′N 19°44′E
- Country: Poland
- Voivodeship: Łódź
- County: Tomaszów
- Gmina: Będków
- Elevation: 215 m (705 ft)
- Population: 320

Rzeczków [ˈʐɛt͡ʂkuf] is a village in the administrative district of Gmina Będków, within Tomaszów County, Łódź Voivodeship, in central Poland.
