= Lipianki, Łódź Voivodeship =

Lipianki
- Village
- Location within Poland
- Coordinates: 51°37′32″N 19°53′5″E
- Country: Poland
- Voivodeship: Łódź
- County: Tomaszów
- Gmina: Ujazd

Lipianki [liˈpjanki] is a village in the administrative district of Gmina Ujazd, within Tomaszów County, Łódź Voivodeship, in central Poland.
