= Gmina Będków =

Gmina Będków Będków Commune
- Gmina

- Coat of arms
- Interactive map of Gmina Będków
- Coordinates (Będków): 51°35′14″N 19°44′53″E
- Country: Poland
- Voivodeship: Łódź
- County: Tomaszów
- Seat: Będków

Area
  - Total: 57.88 km^{2} (22.35 sq mi)

Population (2006)
  - Total: 3,520
  - Density: 60.8/km^{2} (158/sq mi)
- Time zone: UTC+1 (CET)
  - Summer (DST): UTC+2 (CEST)
- Website: gmina.bedkow.com.pl

Gmina Będków is a rural gmina (administrative district) in Tomaszów County, Łódź Voivodeship, in central Poland. Its seat is the village of Będków, which lies approximately 21 kilometres (13 mi) north-west of Tomaszów Mazowiecki and 30 km (19 mi) south-east of the regional capital Łódź.

The gmina covers an area of 57.88 square kilometres (22.3 sq mi), and as of 2006 its total population is 3,520.

== Villages ==
Gmina Będków contains the villages and settlements of:

- Będków
- Brzóstów
- Ceniawy
- Drzazgowa Wola
- Ewcin
- Gutków
- Kalinów
- Łaknarz
- Magdalenka
- Nowiny
- Prażki
- Remiszewice
- Rosocha
- Rudnik
- Rzeczków
- Sługocice
- Teodorów
- Wykno
- Zacharz

== Neighbouring gminas ==
Gmina Będków is bordered by the gminas of Brójce, Czarnocin, Moszczenica, Rokiciny, Ujazd and Wolbórz.
