= Ojrzanów, Łódź Voivodeship =

Ojrzanów
- Village
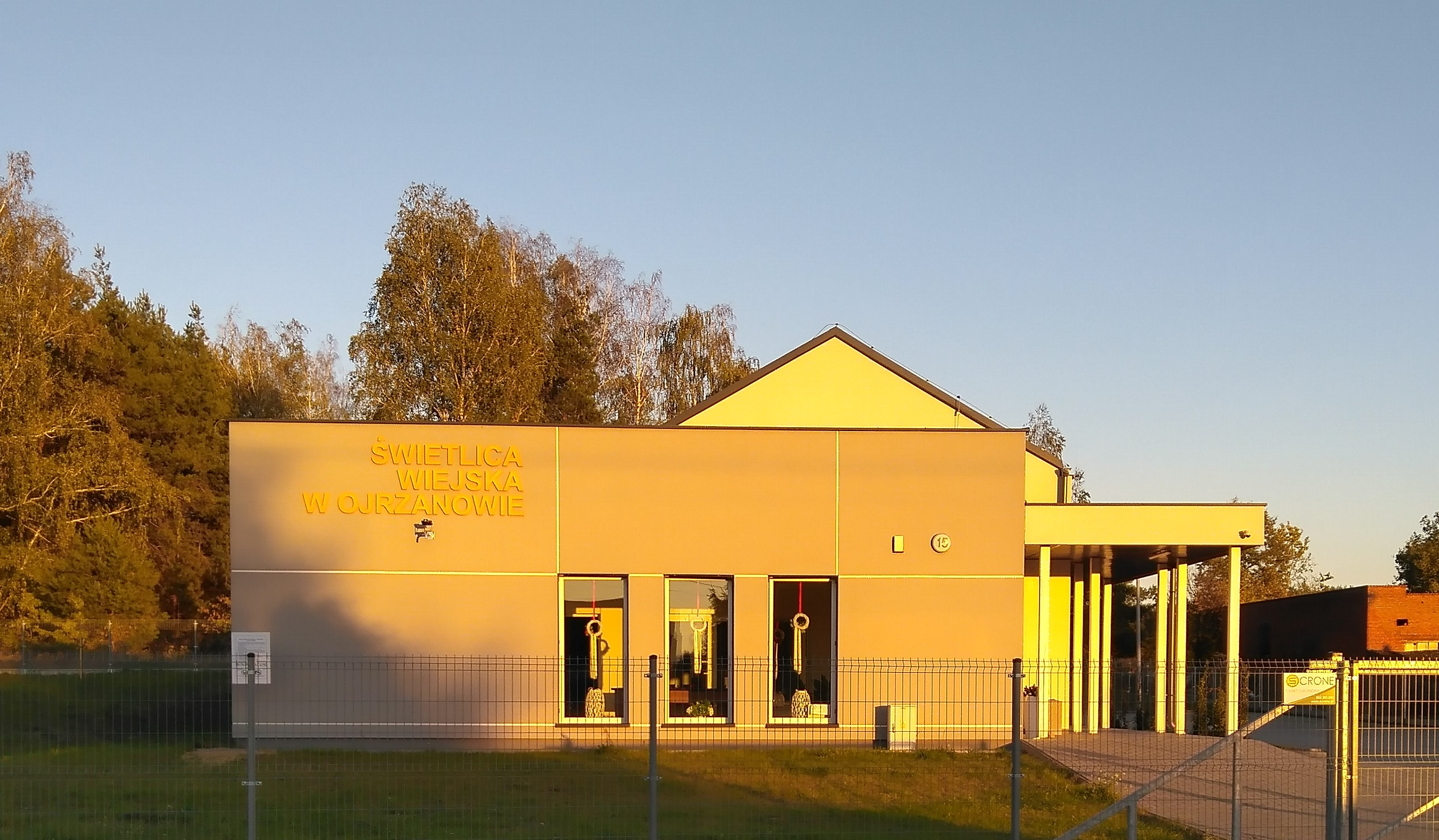

- Location within Poland
- Coordinates: 51°35′6″N 19°57′25″E
- Country: Poland
- Voivodeship: Łódź
- County: Tomaszów
- Gmina: Ujazd
- Time zone: UTC+1 (CET)
  - Summer (DST): UTC+2 (CEST)
- Vehicle registration: ETM

Ojrzanów [ɔi̯ˈʐanuf] is a village in the administrative district of Gmina Ujazd, within Tomaszów County, Łódź Voivodeship, in central Poland.

== History ==
According to the 1921 census, Ojrzanów had a population of 142, entirely Polish by nationality and Roman Catholic by confession.

During the German occupation of Poland (World War II), the occupiers operated a forced labour camp for Poles and Jews at a local sawmill.
