= Magdalenka, Gmina Będków =

Magdalenka
- Village
- Location within Poland
- Coordinates: 51°34′23″N 19°47′52″E
- Country: Poland
- Voivodeship: Łódź
- County: Tomaszów
- Gmina: Będków
- Population: 60

Magdalenka [maɡdaˈlɛŋka] is a village in the administrative district of Gmina Będków, within Tomaszów County, Łódź Voivodeship, in central Poland.
