= Gmina Żelechlinek =

Gmina Żelechlinek Żelechlinek Commune
- Gmina
- Flag Coat of arms
- Interactive map of Gmina Żelechlinek
- Coordinates (Żelechlinek): 51°43′N 20°2′E
- Country: Poland
- Voivodeship: Łódź
- County: Tomaszów
- Seat: Żelechlinek

Area
  - Total: 92.01 km^{2} (35.53 sq mi)

Population (2006)
  - Total: 3,470
  - Density: 37.7/km^{2} (97.7/sq mi)
- Website: http://www.zelechlinek.pl

Gmina Żelechlinek is a rural gmina (administrative district) in Tomaszów County, Łódź Voivodeship, in central Poland. Its seat is the village of Żelechlinek, which lies approximately 23 kilometres (14 mi) north of Tomaszów Mazowiecki and 40 km (25 mi) east of the regional capital Łódź.

The gmina covers an area of 92.01 square kilometres (35.5 sq mi), and as of 2006, its total population is 3,470.

== Villages ==
Gmina Żelechlinek contains the villages and settlements of Brenik, Budki Łochowskie, Bukowiec, Chociszew, Czechowice, Czerwonka, Dzielnica, Feliksów, Gawerków, Gutkowice, Gutkowice-Nowiny, Ignatów, Janów, Józefin, Julianów, Karolinów, Kopiec, Lesisko, Łochów Nowy, Łochów Stary, Lucjanów, Modrzewek, Naropna, Nowe Byliny, Nowiny, Petrynów, Radwanka, Sabinów, Sokołówka, Stanisławów, Staropole, Świniokierz Dworski, Świniokierz Włościański, Teklin, Władysławów, Wola Naropińska, Wolica, Żelechlin and Żelechlinek.

== Neighbouring gminas ==
Gmina Żelechlinek is bordered by the gminas of Budziszewice, Czerniewice, Głuchów, Jeżów, Koluszki, Lubochnia and Rawa Mazowiecka.
