= Brzóstów =

- Village
- Location within Poland
- Coordinates: 51°36′4″N 19°48′26″E
- Country: Poland
- Voivodeship: Łódź
- County: Tomaszów
- Gmina: Będków

Brzóstów [ˈbʐustuf] is a village in the administrative district of Gmina Będków, within Tomaszów County, Łódź Voivodeship, in central Poland.
