= Chociszew, Gmina Żelechlinek =

Chociszew
- Village
- Location within Poland
- Coordinates: 51°40′48″N 20°4′53″E
- Country: Poland
- Voivodeship: Łódź
- County: Tomaszów
- Gmina: Żelechlinek

Chociszew [xɔˈt͡ɕiʂɛf] is a village in the administrative district of Gmina Żelechlinek, within Tomaszów County, Łódź Voivodeship, in central Poland.
