= Rokiciny, Łódź Voivodeship =

Rokiciny
- Village
- Location within Poland
- Coordinates: 51°39′9″N 19°48′10″E
- Country: Poland
- Voivodeship: Łódź
- County: Tomaszów
- Gmina: Rokiciny

Rokiciny [rɔkiˈt͡ɕinɨ] is a village in Tomaszów County, Łódź Voivodeship, in central Poland. It is the seat of the gmina (administrative district) called Gmina Rokiciny.
