= Gmina Rokiciny =

Gmina Rokiciny Rokiciny Commune
- Gmina
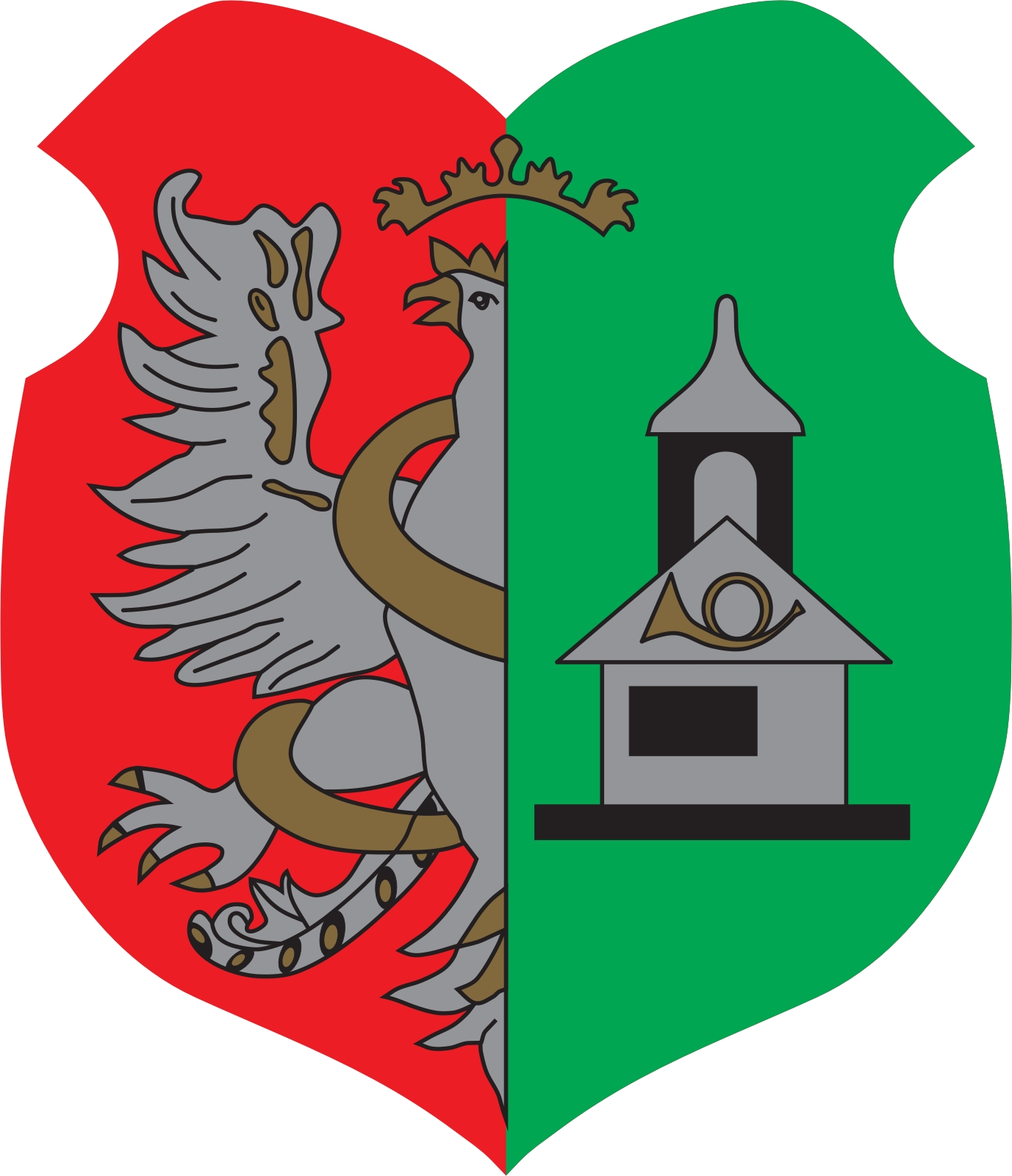
- Coat of arms
- Interactive map of Gmina Rokiciny
- Coordinates (Rokiciny): 51°39′9″N 19°48′10″E
- Country: Poland
- Voivodeship: Łódź
- County: Tomaszów
- Seat: Rokiciny-Kolonia

Area
  - Total: 90.51 km^{2} (34.95 sq mi)

Population (2006)
  - Total: 5,925
  - Density: 65.46/km^{2} (169.5/sq mi)
- Website: http://www.rokiciny.net

Gmina Rokiciny is a rural gmina (administrative district) in Tomaszów County, Łódź Voivodeship, in central Poland. Its seat is the village of Rokiciny, which lies approximately 22 kilometres (14 mi) north-west of Tomaszów Mazowiecki and 28 km (17 mi) south-east of the regional capital Łódź.

The gmina covers an area of 90.51 square kilometres (34.9 sq mi), and as of 2006 its total population is 5,925.

== Villages ==
Gmina Rokiciny contains the villages and settlements of Albertów, Cisów, Eminów, Janinów, Janków, Jankówek, Łaznów, Łaznów-Kolonia, Łaznówek, Łaznowska Wola, Maksymilianów, Michałów, Mikołajów, Nowe Chrusty, Pogorzałe Ługi, Popielawy, Reginów, Rokiciny, Rokiciny-Kolonia, Stare Chrusty and Stefanów.

== Neighbouring gminas ==
Gmina Rokiciny is bordered by the gminas of Będków, Brójce, Koluszki and Ujazd.
