= Dzielnica, Gmina Żelechlinek =

Dzielnica
- Village
- Location within Poland
- Coordinates: 51°44′32″N 19°59′22″E
- Country: Poland
- Voivodeship: Łódź
- County: Tomaszów
- Gmina: Żelechlinek

Dzielnica [d͡ʑɛlˈnit͡sa] is a village in the administrative district of Gmina Żelechlinek, within Tomaszów County, Łódź Voivodeship, in central Poland.
