= Gmina Budziszewice =

Gmina Budziszewice Budziszewice Commune
- Gmina
- Municipal office

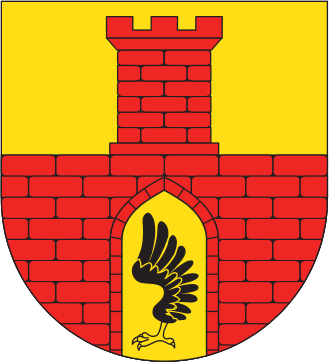
- Coat of arms
- Interactive map of Gmina Budziszewice
- Coordinates (Budziszewice): 51°40′9″N 19°56′15″E
- Country: Poland
- Voivodeship: Łódź
- County: Tomaszów
- Seat: Budziszewice

Area
  - Total: 30.13 km^{2} (11.63 sq mi)

Population (2006)
  - Total: 2,217
  - Density: 73.58/km^{2} (190.6/sq mi)
- Time zone: UTC+1 (CET)
  - Summer (DST): UTC+2 (CEST)
- Website: www.budziszewice.net

Gmina Budziszewice is a rural gmina (administrative district) in Tomaszów County, Łódź Voivodeship, in central Poland. Its seat is the village of Budziszewice, which lies approximately 18 kilometres (11 mi) north of Tomaszów Mazowiecki and 35 km (22 mi) east of the regional capital Łódź.

The gmina covers an area of 30.13 square kilometres (11.6 sq mi), and as of 2006 its total population is 2,217.

== Villages ==
Gmina Budziszewice contains the villages and settlements of:

- Adamów
- Agnopol
- Antolin
- Budziszewice
- Helenów
- Mierzno
- Nepomucenów
- Nowe Mierzno
- Nowy Józefów
- Nowy Rękawiec
- Rękawiec
- Stary Józefów
- Teodorów
- Walentynów
- Węgrzynowice
- Węgrzynowice-Modrzewie
- Zalesie

== Neighbouring gminas ==
Gmina Budziszewice is bordered by the gminas of Koluszki, Lubochnia, Ujazd and Żelechlinek.
