= Rosocha, Łódź Voivodeship =

Rosocha
- Village
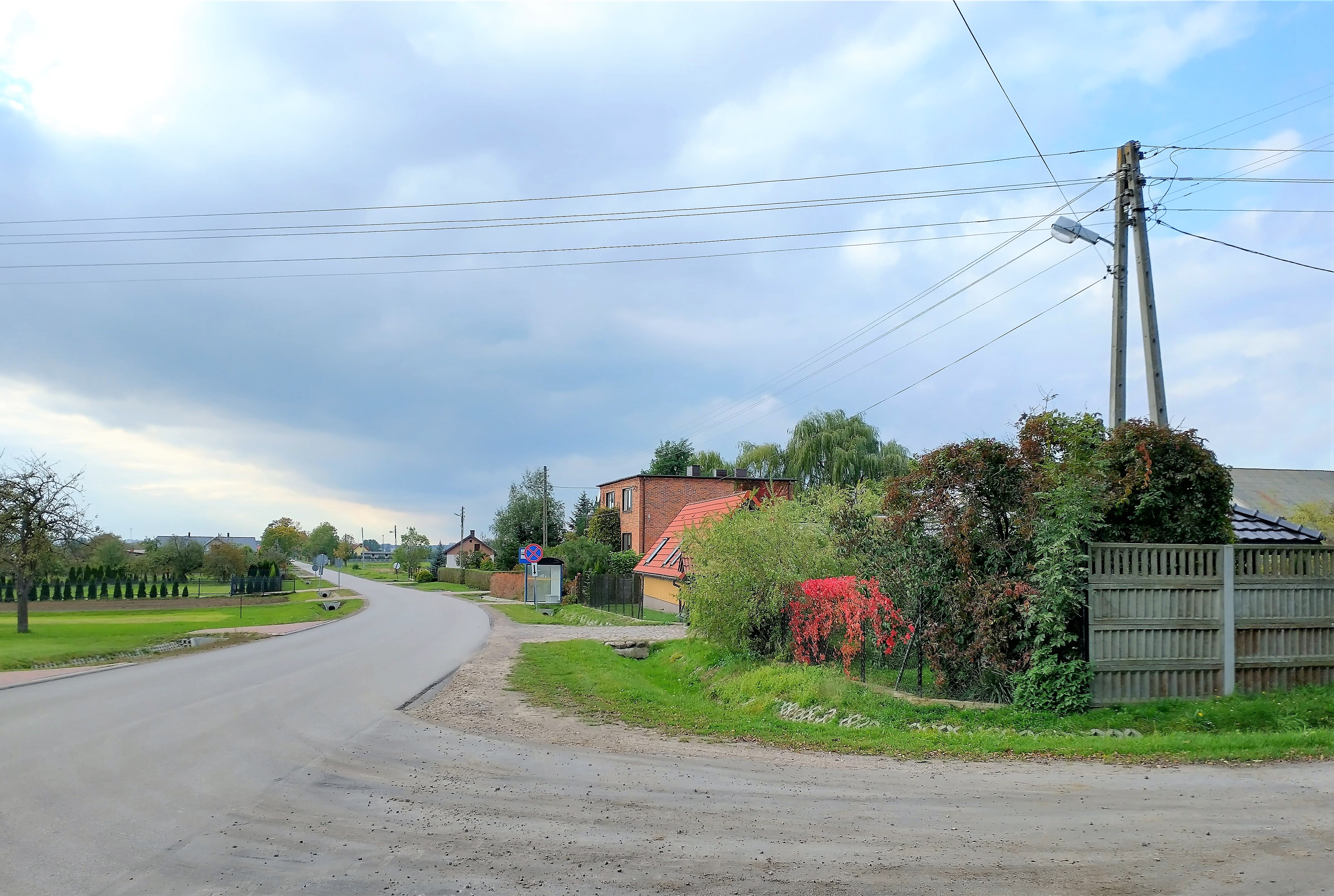

- Location within Poland
- Coordinates: 51°35′11″N 19°46′29″E
- Country: Poland
- Voivodeship: Łódź
- County: Tomaszów
- Gmina: Będków

Rosocha [rɔˈsɔxa] is a village in the administrative district of Gmina Będków, within Tomaszów County, Łódź Voivodeship, in central Poland.
