= Cisów, Łódź Voivodeship =

Cisów
- Village
- Location within Poland
- Coordinates: 51°38′51″N 19°45′13″E
- Country: Poland
- Voivodeship: Łódź
- County: Tomaszów
- Gmina: Rokiciny

Cisów [ˈt͡ɕisuf] is a village in the administrative district of Gmina Rokiciny, within Tomaszów County, Łódź Voivodeship, in central Poland.
