= Feliksów, Gmina Żelechlinek =

Feliksów
- Village
- Location within Poland
- Coordinates: 51°43′36″N 20°4′16″E
- Country: Poland
- Voivodeship: Łódź
- County: Tomaszów
- Gmina: Żelechlinek

Feliksów (Polish pronunciation: [fɛˈliksuf]) is a village in the administrative district of Gmina Żelechlinek, within Tomaszów County, Łódź Voivodeship, in central Poland.
