= Rosocha, Bytów County =

Rosocha
- Settlement
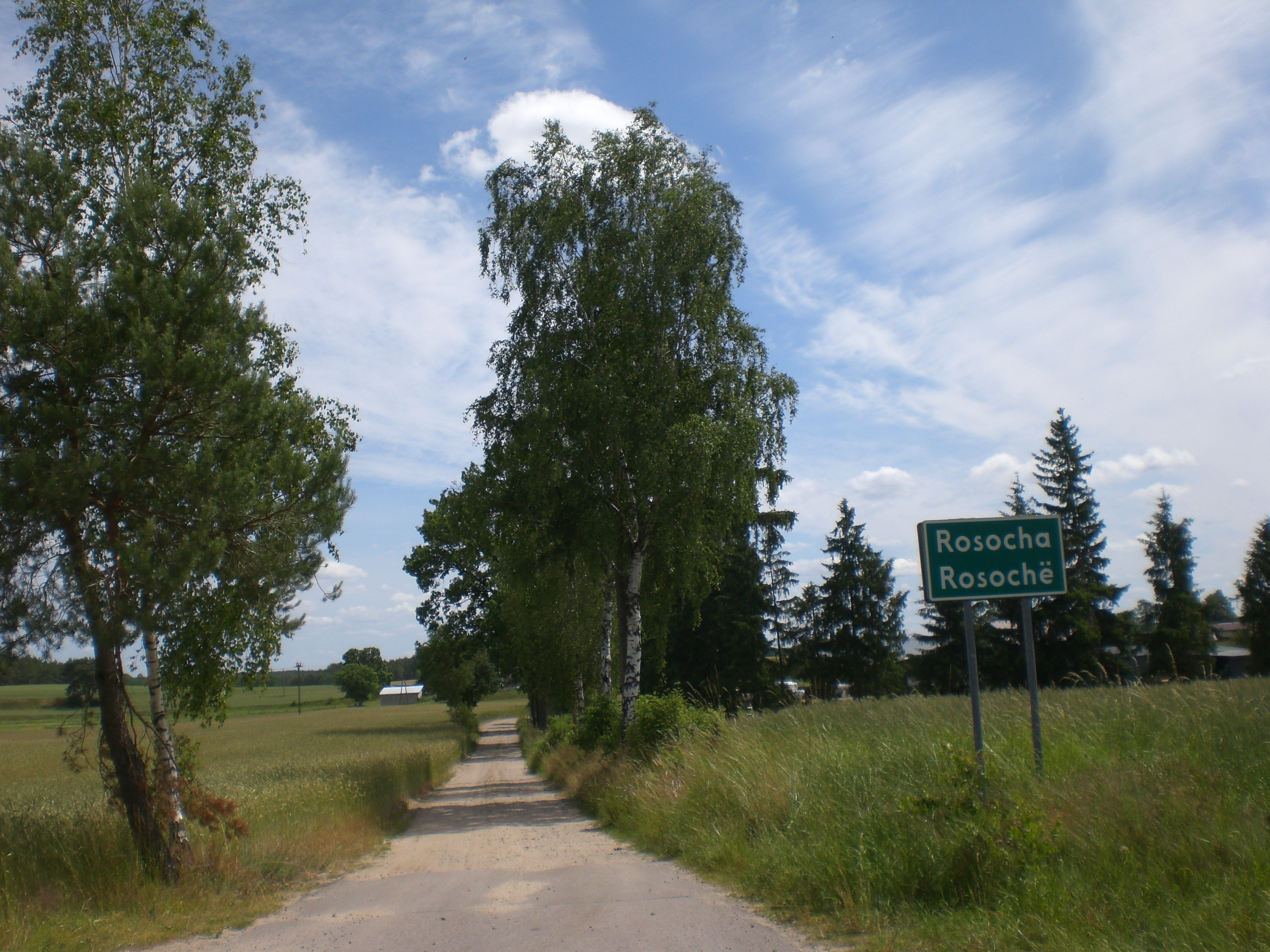
- Rosocha

- Location within Poland
- Coordinates: 53°56′52″N 17°21′12″E
- Country: Poland
- Voivodeship: Pomeranian
- County: Bytów
- Gmina: Lipnica
- Population: 5

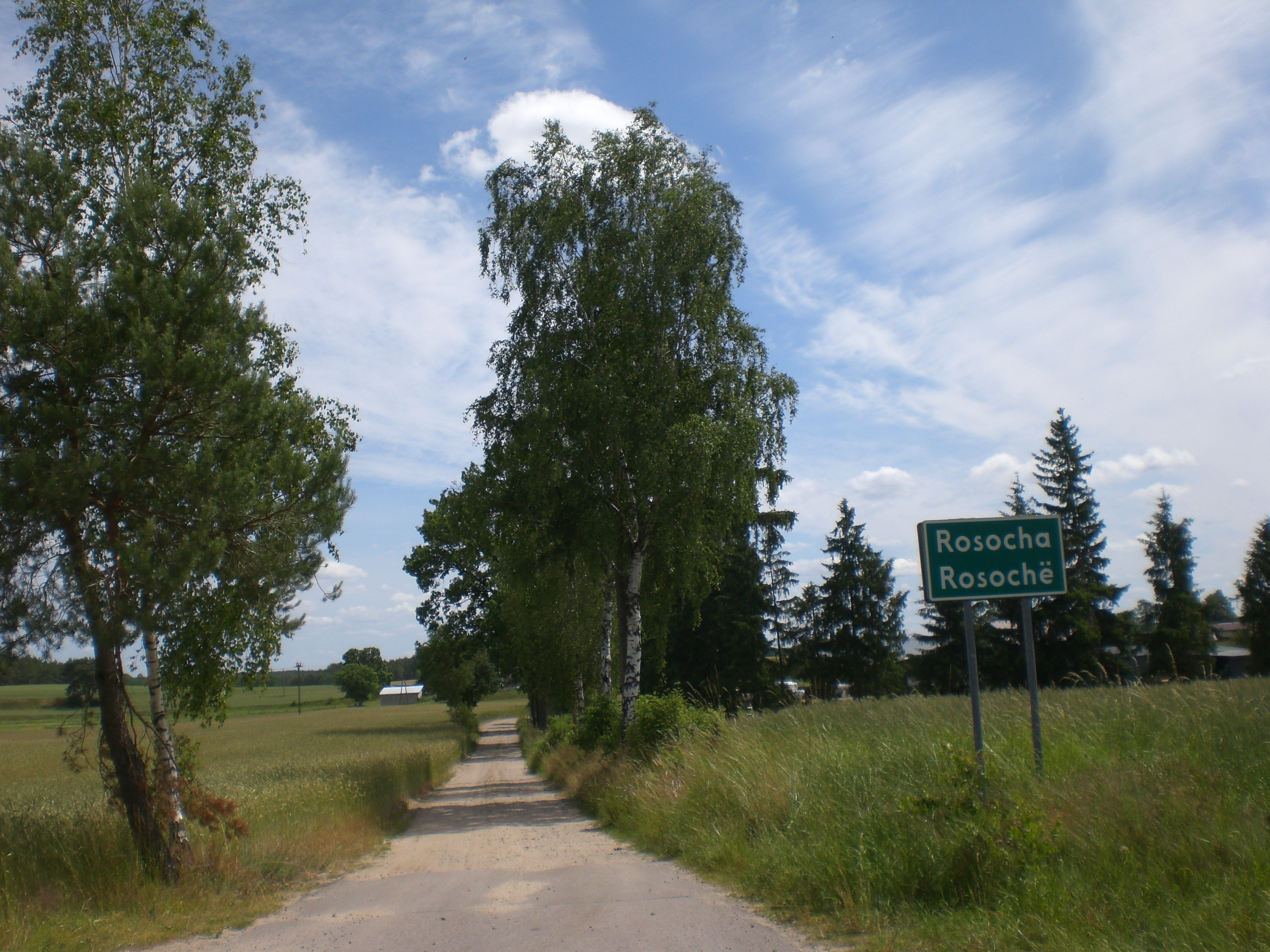
Rosocha

Rosocha [rɔˈsɔxa] is a settlement in the administrative district of Gmina Lipnica, within Bytów County, Pomeranian Voivodeship, in northern Poland.

For details of the history of the region, see History of Pomerania.
