= Żelechlinek =

- Village
- Location within Poland
- Coordinates: 51°43′N 20°2′E
- Country: Poland
- Voivodeship: Łódź
- County: Tomaszów
- Gmina: Żelechlinek

Żelechlinek [ʐɛlɛˈxlinɛk] is a village in Tomaszów County, Łódź Voivodeship, in central Poland. It is the seat of the gmina (administrative district) called Gmina Żelechlinek.
