= Tomaszów County, Łódź Voivodeship =

Tomaszów County Powiat tomaszowski
- County
- Flag Coat of arms

- Location within the voivodeship
- Coordinates (Tomaszów Mazowiecki): 51°31′N 20°1′E
- Country: Poland
- Voivodeship: Łódź
- Seat: Tomaszów Mazowiecki
- Gminas: Total 11 (incl. 1 urban): Tomaszów Mazowiecki; Gmina Będków; Gmina Budziszewice; Gmina Czerniewice; Gmina Inowłódz; Gmina Lubochnia; Gmina Rokiciny; Gmina Rzeczyca; Gmina Tomaszów Mazowiecki; Gmina Ujazd; Gmina Żelechlinek

Area
  - Total: 1,025.7 km^{2} (396.0 sq mi)

Population (2006)
  - Total: 120,973
  - Density: 117.94/km^{2} (305.47/sq mi)
  - Urban: 66,705
  - Rural: 54,268
- Car plates: ETM
- Website: www.powiat-tomaszowski.pl

Tomaszów County (Polish: powiat tomaszowski) is a county in Łódź Voivodeship, central Poland. It came into being on January 1, 1999, as a result of the Polish local government reforms passed in 1998. Its administrative seat and only town is Tomaszów Mazowiecki, which lies 49 kilometres (30 mi) south-east of the regional capital Łódź.

The county covers an area of 1,025.7 square kilometres (396.0 sq mi). As of 2006 its total population is 120,973, out of which the population of Tomaszów Mazowiecki is 66,705 and the rural population is 54,268.

== Neighbouring counties ==
Tomaszów County is bordered by Brzeziny County, Skierniewice County and Rawa County to the north, Grójec County and Przysucha County to the east, Opoczno County to the south-east, Piotrków County to the west, and Łódź East County to the north-west.

== Administrative divisions ==
The county is subdivided into 11 gminas (one urban and 10 rural). These are listed in the following table, in descending order of population.

Gmina	Type	Area (km^{2})	Population (2006)	Seat
Tomaszów Mazowiecki	urban	41.3	66,705	
Gmina Tomaszów Mazowiecki	rural	151.3	9,826	Tomaszów Mazowiecki *
Gmina Ujazd	rural	97.0	7,747	Ujazd
Gmina Lubochnia	rural	131.6	7,600	Lubochnia
Gmina Rokiciny	rural	90.5	5,925	Rokiciny
Gmina Czerniewice	rural	127.7	5,113	Czerniewice
Gmina Rzeczyca	rural	108.3	4,971	Rzeczyca
Gmina Inowłódz	rural	98.0	3,879	Inowłódz
Gmina Będków	rural	57.9	3,520	Będków
Gmina Żelechlinek	rural	92.0	3,470	Żelechlinek
Gmina Budziszewice	rural	30.1	2,217	Budziszewice
* seat not part of the gmina
