= Ujazd, Tomaszów County =

Ujazd
- Town
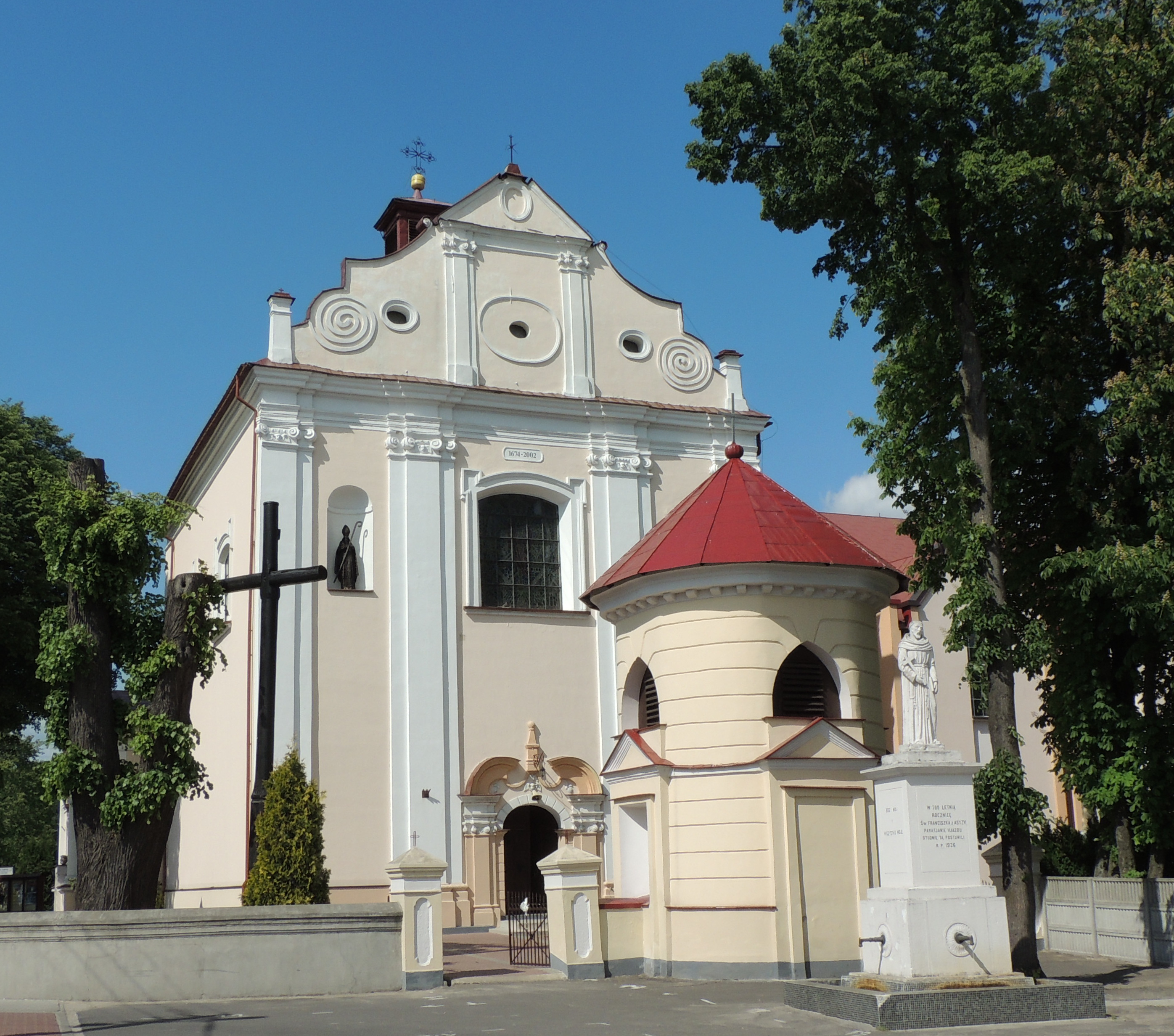
- Saint Adalbert church

- Flag Coat of arms

- Location within Poland Location within Łódź Voivodeship
- Coordinates: 51°35′40″N 19°55′37″E
- Country: Poland
- Voivodeship: Łódź
- County: Tomaszów
- Gmina: Ujazd
- First mentioned: 1283
- Town rights: 1428

Population
  - Total: 1,700
- Time zone: UTC+1 (CET)
  - Summer (DST): UTC+2 (CEST)
- Vehicle registration: ETM

Ujazd [ˈujast] is a town in Tomaszów County, Łódź Voivodeship, in central Poland. It is the seat of the gmina (administrative district) called Gmina Ujazd. It lies approximately 11 kilometres (7 mi) north-west of Tomaszów Mazowiecki and 39 km (24 mi) south-east of the regional capital Łódź. It is located within the historic Łęczyca Land.

== History ==
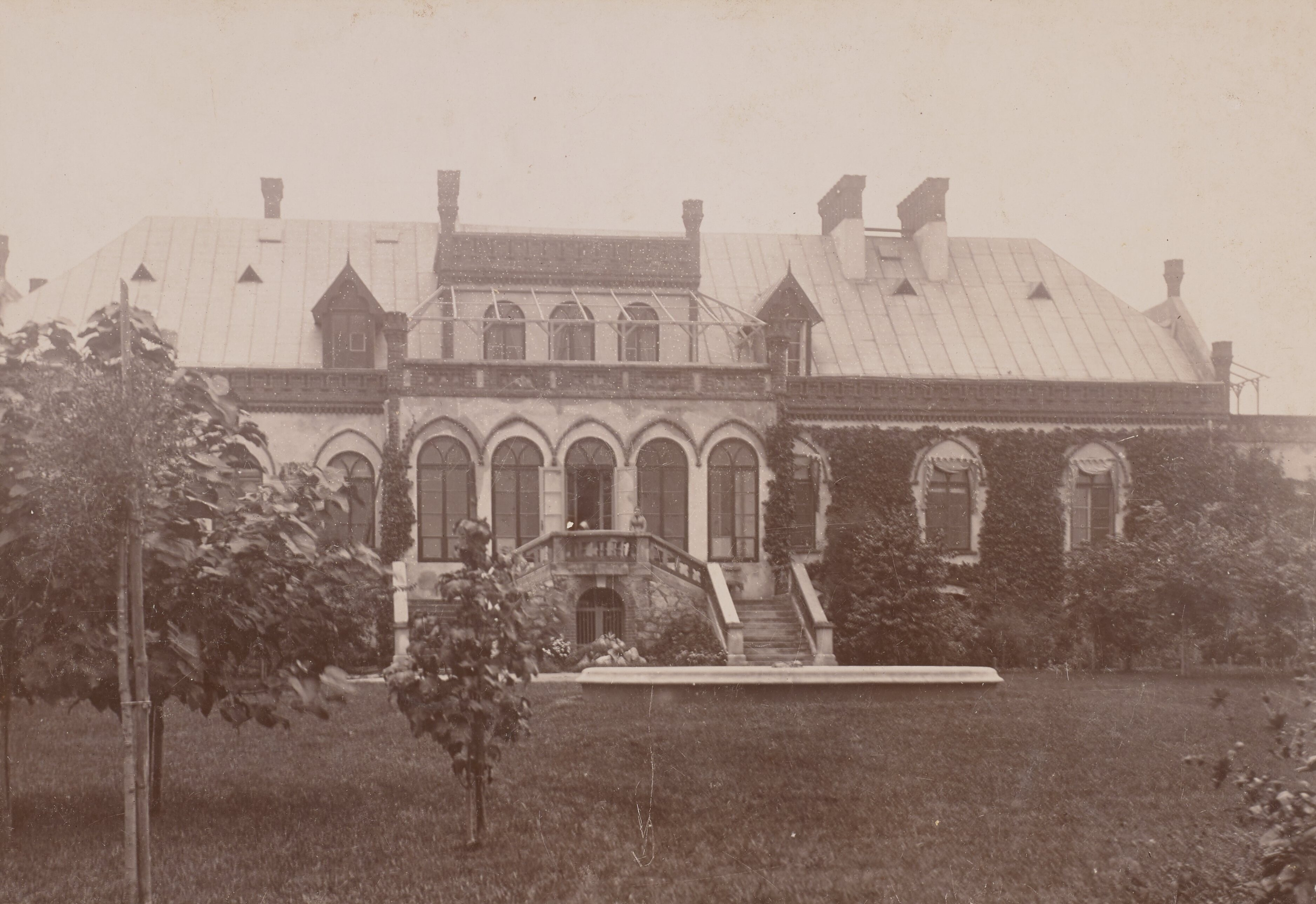
Ostrowski Palace in c. 1895

Ujazd was granted town rights in 1428 by Polish King Władysław II Jagiełło thanks to efforts of Piotr Tłuk, swordbearer of Łęczyca. It was a private town of Polish nobility, including the Dunin, Szczawiński, Denhoff and Ostrowski families, administratively located in the Brzeziny County in the Łęczyca Voivodeship in the Greater Poland Province of the Kingdom of Poland. Its royal privileges were confirmed by Polish Kings Casimir IV Jagiellon, Sigismund III Vasa, and Stanisław August Poniatowski, in 1476, 1615 and 1786, respectively. In the 17th century, Primate of Poland Andrzej Olszowski, native of nearby Olszowa erected the Baroque Saint Adalbert Church.

According to the 1921 census, Ujazd had a population of 1,978, 76.8% Polish and 22.4% Jewish.

During the German occupation of Poland (World War II), the occupiers operated a forced labour camp for Poles and Jews at a local sawmill.
