= Royal Chapel, Gdańsk =

Royal Chapel
- Holy Spirit, Andrew the Apostle, and John the Baptist Church
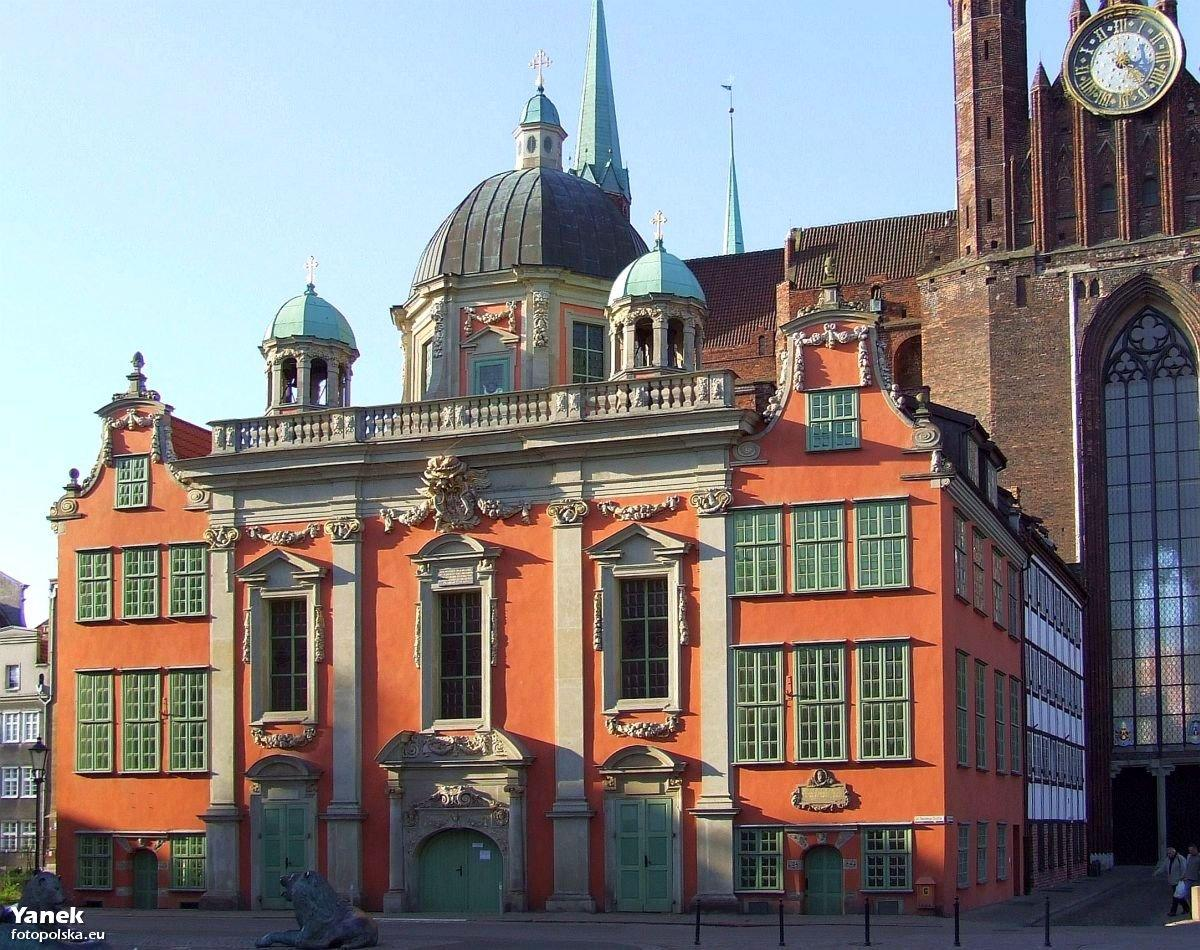
- The Royal Chapel in 2012
- Royal Chapel
- 54.35033°N 18.65373°E
- Address: ul. św. Ducha 58
- Country: Poland
- Denomination: Roman Catholic

History
- Dedication: Holy Spirit; Andrew the Apostle; John the Baptist
- Consecrated: 16 October 1685

Architecture
- Architect: Tylman van Gameren
- Style: Baroque
- Years built: 1678–1681
- Groundbreaking: 21 July 1678
- Completed: 10 May 1681

Administration
- Archdiocese: Gdańsk
- Parish: Assumption of Mary in Gdańsk

Clergy
- Priest: Ireneusz Bradtke

The Royal Chapel (Polish: Kaplica Królewska), also known as the Holy Spirit Church (Polish: Kościół pw. Świętego Ducha) and formally as the Holy Spirit, Andrew the Apostle, and John the Baptist Church (Polish: Kościół pw. Ducha Świętego oraz Andrzeja Apostoła i Jana Chrzciciela), is a Baroque Roman Catholic church located in Śródmieście, Gdańsk. Completed in 1681 and consecrated in 1685, it is a notable example of Baroque architecture in the city. It is a part of St. Mary's Church and hosts Mass on certain occasions. It is on the regional heritage list.

== Characteristics ==
The Chapel is located at ul. św. Ducha (Holy Spirit Street) 58, facing north, and was built in a Baroque style, being the only example of a Baroque church in the Main City; it is notable for its distinctive style. It is located between two smaller townhouses, and the façade of the church itself is partitioned from the townhouses by two pilasters. A central portal is further separated from the two other entrances to the building by two pilasters. One large dome and two smaller such structures are found above the façade.

As of 2014, tourist access to the Chapel had been restricted and could only be attained by contacting the offices of St. Mary's Church. As of 2013, it was only hosting church services for children on Sunday, but by 2025, it had shifted to services for tourists and English speakers. Mass is only held on certain occasions.

== History ==
Various clergy houses were present on the site of the modern-day Royal Chapel as early as the mid-14th century. In 1589, a chapel dedicated to Andrew the Apostle was founded near one clergy house, and in 1678, the construction of the Royal Chapel began. Its name derived from the fact that John III Sobieski was a principal patron of the project, though much of it was also funded by primate of Poland Andrzej Olszowski, who dedicated money to constructing the church in his last will and testament. Construction concluded in 1681, and the church was consecrated on 16 October 1685 by Bonawentura Madaliński as the Holy Spirit, Andrew the Apostle, and John the Baptist Church.

Its designer was the Dutch-Polish architect Tylman van Gameren. Starting in 1840, it became the seat of its own parish, maintaining that role up to October 1962. During the Siege of Danzig in 1945, the Chapel suffered extensive damage. It was rebuilt from 1946 to 1948 and ceased being the parish seat in 1962. A renovation of the church began in 2025.
