= Düringer =

Düringer is a surname. Notable people with the surname include:

- Annemarie Düringer (1925–2014), Swiss actress
- Hans Düringer (died 1477), German clockmaker
- Roland Düringer (born 1963), Austrian actor, cabarettist, and political activist
