= Münster astronomical clock =

Astronomical clock in Münster Cathedral, Germany

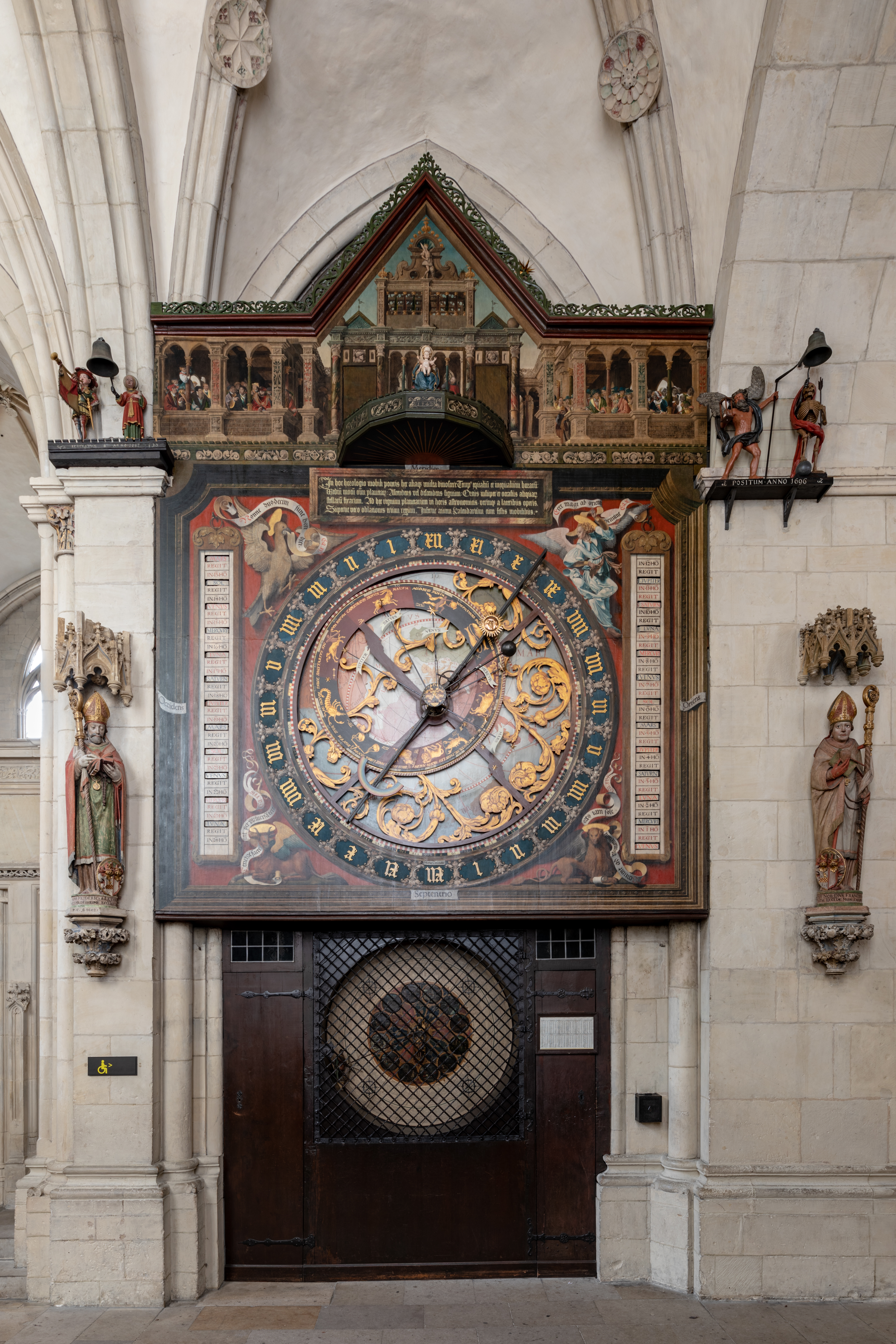
Astronomical Clock with chimes, astrolabe (above) and kalendarium (below)

The Münster astronomical clock is an astronomical clock in Münster Cathedral in Münster, Germany.

The clock, built between 1540 and 1542, is one of the most significant monumental clocks in the German-speaking world. It belongs to the so-called "Family of Hanseatic Clocks", of which other examples survive in Gdańsk (clock), Rostock (clock), Stralsund (clock) and Stendal in near-original condition (two further clocks in Lübeck and Wismar were destroyed in 1942 and 1945 respectively). The Münster clock shares a range of characteristics with this family of clocks.

Situated in a vault between the high choir and the south arm of the ambulatory at the cathedral's east end, the clock is one of the few existing monumental clocks which turns anti-clockwise.

The chimes inside the clock (10 bells, tonal range of d♭^{1}–f^{2}) can be operated from the cathedral organ.

== History ==
Technical Details
Height of the Clock	7.8 m
Width of the central portion	4.1 m
Diameter of the dial	3.0 m
Diameter of the Calendar dial	1.5 m
Height of the Planet tables	2.3 m
Weight of the astrolabe	110 kg
Number of bells	10

The first astronomical clock in the cathedral existed from 1408 until it was destroyed in 1534 as part of the iconoclasm during the Baptist rule. No drawing has been handed down to show us what that clock looked like, but, like other ornamental clocks of the 14th and 15th century, it will doubtless have consisted of three parts: the procession of the Three Magi, the clock face, and the calendar. The second and current clock was erected between 1540 and 1542 by printer and mathematician Dietrich Tzwyvel. The gear system of the clock was worked out by Tzwyvel and the Franciscan cathedral preacher Johann von Aachen. Metalwork was done by the locksmith Nikolaus Windemaker and painting by Ludger tom Ring the Elder.

In the Gregorian calendar reform of 1582, the calendar was "put forward" (15 October followed 4 October) and a new system introduced for the leap year. Since then, the calculation of the date of Easter and the days of the week from the clock's Kalendarium has been complicated.

The world map (mirrored for astronomical purposes) was painted in the background of the dial shortly after 1660 and the wooden astrolabe was replaced by a new one in the baroque style (an open bronze disc inside the dial with 15 fixed stars). In 1696 the mechanism was replaced and a quarter-hour chime with the figures of Chronos (god of time) and Death was installed.

In 1818, the installation of a scissor-pin-gear with a four-metre-long (13 ft) pendulum led to considerable noise pollution in the cathedral and complaints about the poor condition of the clock, which continued for the whole of the nineteenth century.

In 1927 the clock struck for the last time and it was proposed that it be removed, but instead it was fully renovated between 1929 and 1932 and a new mechanism was installed. The calculations for this were carried out by Ernst Schulz and Erich Hüttenhain from the astronomical society of Münster, the mechanism was built by master clockmaker Heinrich Eggeringhaus on behalf of Eduard Korfhage & Söhne, a company in Melle which produced mechanisms for clocktowers.

In the Second World War the mechanism was removed, but the housing remained in the cathedral and escaped damage. On 21 December 1951 the clock was put back in service, after the repair of war damage to the cathedral.

== Display ==
The display of the clock is made up of three parts, as was common in the Middle Ages:

=== Upper part ===
In the upper area is a scene in Renaissance style.

- The central part is shaped like a pediment. It has a sculpture of the baby Jesus seated in Mary's lap.
- In the pediment itself is the young King David with a sword and the head of Goliath in his hands.
- Below David is an inscription "Ludgeri Ringii Mo(naster)iensis opus" ("Work of Ludger Ring of Mü(nster)").

In front of Mary and Jesus is a passageway for figures. Once a day, at noon, there is an automated sequence depicting the Adoration of the Magi.

- First a golden star on a metal rod appears from behind the pediment and stops in front of the depiction of Mary.
- Next the right door opens. Metal figures of the Three Kings come out, march up to Mary and Jesus, bow to them and then depart through the left door. The kings are accompanied by two wooden servants.
- While the figures are moving, the chimes play inside the clock with the tunes of "In dulci jubilo“ and "Lobe den Herren“.

The upper area is flanked on left and right by two groups of sculpture.

- On the left side is a little wooden trumpeter and a woman with a bell. At each full hour, the trumpeter sounds the number of the hour on his horn; the noise actually comes from a wooden pipe inside the clock. The woman beside him then strikes the bell.
- The group of sculptures on the right hand side was added in 1696. It depicts death and Chronos the god of time with a bell. At each quarter hour, Death strikes his bell, while Chronos turns an hourglass over.

=== Astrolabium ===
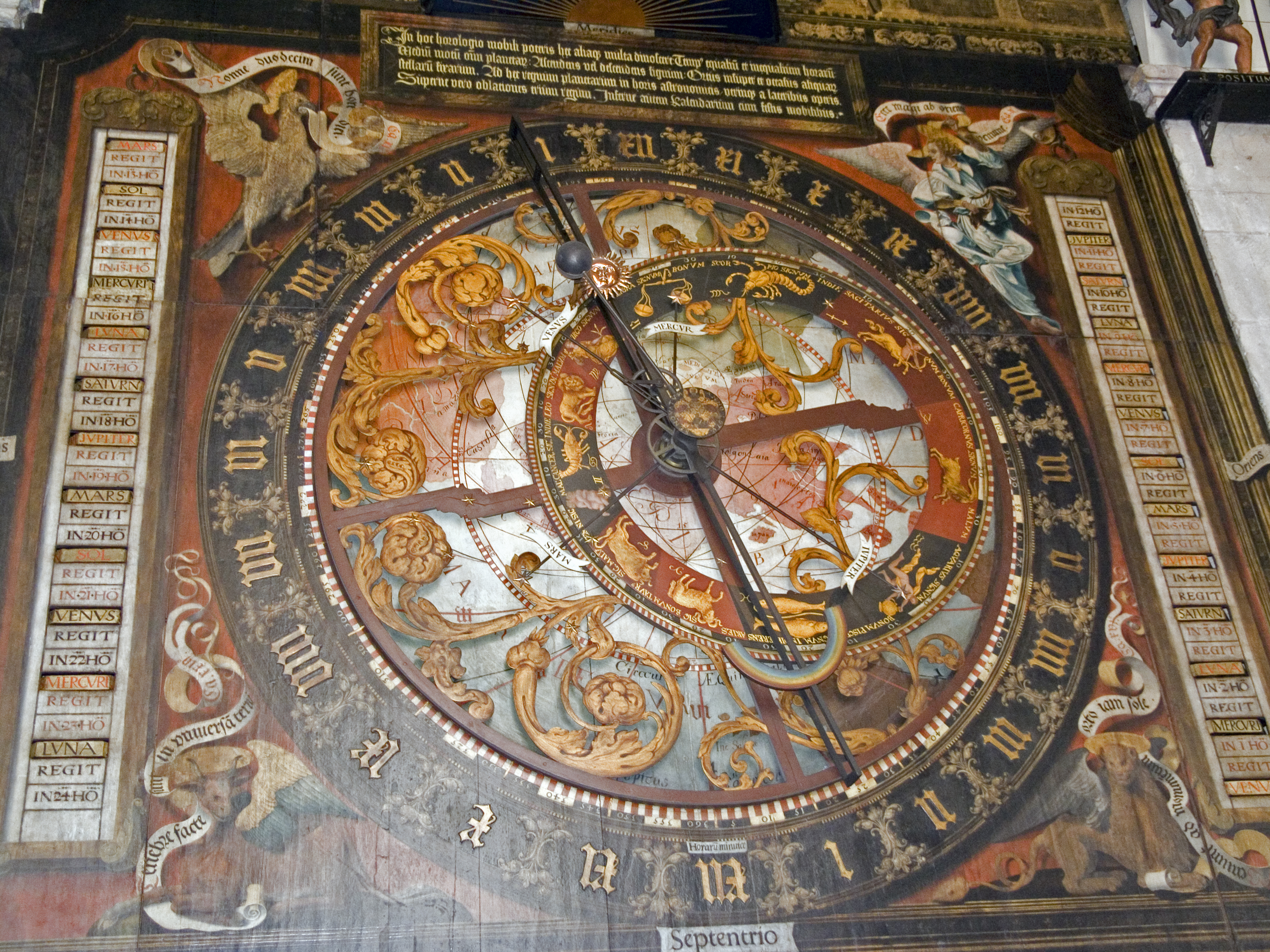
The Astrolabium of the Astronomical Clock

In the central section of the clock is an Astrolabium with the "actual" clock, which shows the phases of the Moon and the locations of the planets.

- The upper half of the dial contains a Latin inscription: In hoc horologio mobili poteris haec aliaque multa dignoscere:... (In this moving clock you can see these and many other things:)

"The equal and unequal hours, the central process of the planets, the ascending and descending signs of the zodiac, and in addition the ascensions and descensions of the fixed stars. Windows on each side of the dial show where each planet rules. Above is the adoration of the Three Kings, below is the Kalendarium with the movable feasts."

- In the spandrels at the corners of the dial are depictions of the Four Evangelists – instead of the depictions of the Four Astronomers found on many other astronomical clocks.
- The dial is flanked on left and right by two planetary tables.

=== Kalendarium ===
In the lower part is a Kalendarium, which is covered by a late Gothic grill. It is a perpetual calendar with the dates for each year from 1540 until 2071. This 532 year time-frame depicts a so-called Dionysian Era, after which the 19 year lunar cycle and the 28 year solar cycle synchronise, so that the same days of the month and week days would apply for 2072 as for 1540.

The calendar dial is itself divided into three parts.

- In the inner circle are twelve Latin calendar verses with corresponding images for each month.
- The information on the next ring out records the days of the year. The ring is divided into 365 windows. At night the calendar dial moves one day later; on leap years it is stopped for one day. This ring records the days of the month, the letter of the day (M, T, W, Th, etc.) in modern fashion, and according to the Roman calendar (Kalends, Nones, Ides) and the names of the months, with the appropriate dates for the movable feasts and Easter.
- The outer ring displays information on the 532 year Dionysian Era. The years are enumerated from 1540 to 2071. In addition there is information on the date of Easter and other data (Golden number, Sunday letters in two circles, the intervallum in two circles and the indiction).
