= Clockwise =

Movement in the same direction as a clock's hands

The clockwise direction

The counterclockwise or anticlockwise direction

Two-dimensional rotation can occur in two possible senses or "directions" of rotation. (Note: Not to be confused with the direction of the axis of rotation in a 3D rotation.) Clockwise motion (abbreviated CW) proceeds in the same direction as a clock's hands relative to the observer: from the top to the right, then down and then to the left, and back up to the top. The opposite sense of rotation or revolution is (in Commonwealth English) anticlockwise (ACW) or (in North American English) counterclockwise (CCW). Three-dimensional rotation can have similarly defined senses when considering the corresponding angular velocity vector.

== Terminology ==
Viewed from the north, Earth rotates anticlockwise or counterclockwise

Before clocks were commonplace, the terms "sunwise" (as observed from the northern hemisphere) and the Scottish Gaelic-derived "deasil" (the latter ultimately from an Indo-European root for "right", shared with the Latin dexter) were used to describe clockwise motion, while "widdershins" (from Middle Low German weddersinnes, lit. "against direction") was used for counterclockwise motion.

The terms clockwise and counterclockwise can only be applied to a rotational motion once a side of the rotational plane is specified, from which the rotation is observed. For example, the daily rotation of the Earth is clockwise when viewed from above the South Pole, and counterclockwise when viewed from above the North Pole (considering "above a point" to be defined as "farther away from the center of earth and on the same ray").

The shadow of a horizontal sundial in the Northern Hemisphere rotates clockwise

Clocks traditionally follow this sense of rotation because of the clock's predecessor: the sundial. Clocks with hands were first built in the Northern Hemisphere (see Clock), and they were made to work like horizontal sundials. In order for such a sundial to work north of the equator during spring and summer, and north of the Tropic of Cancer the whole year, the noon-mark of the dial must be placed northward of the pole casting the shadow. Then, when the Sun moves in the sky (from east to south to west), the shadow, which is cast on the sundial in the opposite direction, moves with the same sense of rotation (from west to north to east). This is why hours must be drawn in horizontal sundials in that manner, and why modern clocks have their numbers set in the same way, and their hands moving accordingly. For a vertical sundial (such as those placed on the walls of buildings, the dial being below the post), the movement of the sun is from right to top to left, and, accordingly, the shadow moves from left to down to right, i.e., counterclockwise. This effect is caused by the plane of the dial having been rotated through the plane of the motion of the sun and thus the shadow is observed from the other side of the dial's plane and is observed as moving in the opposite direction. Some clocks were constructed to mimic this. The best-known surviving example is the Münster astronomical clock, whose hands move counterclockwise.

Occasionally, clocks whose hands revolve counterclockwise are sold as a novelty. One historic Jewish clock was built that way in the Jewish Town Hall in Prague in the 18th century, using right-to-left reading in the Hebrew language. In 2014 under Bolivian president Evo Morales, the clock outside the Legislative Assembly in Plaza Murillo, La Paz, was shifted to counterclockwise motion to promote indigenous values.

== Usage ==
=== Shop-work ===
Typical nuts, screws, bolts, bottle caps, and jar lids are tightened (moved away from the observer) clockwise and loosened (moved towards the observer) counterclockwise in accordance with the right-hand rule.

Conventional direction of the axis of a rotating body

To apply the right-hand rule, place one's loosely clenched right hand above the object with the thumb pointing in the direction one wants the screw, nut, bolt, or cap ultimately to move, and the curl of the fingers, from the palm to the tips, will indicate in which way one needs to turn the screw, nut, bolt or cap to achieve the desired result. Almost all threaded objects obey this rule except for a few left-handed exceptions described below.

The reason for the clockwise standard for most screws and bolts is that supination of the arm, which is used by a right-handed person to tighten a screw clockwise, is generally stronger than pronation used to loosen.

Sometimes the opposite (left-handed, counterclockwise, reverse) sense of threading is used for a special reason. A thread might need to be left-handed to prevent operational stresses from loosening it. For example, some older cars and trucks had right-handed lug nuts on the right wheels and left-handed lug nuts on the left wheels, so that, as the vehicle moved forward, the lug nuts tended to tighten rather than loosen. For bicycle pedals, the one on the left must be reverse-threaded to prevent it unscrewing during use. Similarly, the flyer whorl of a spinning wheel uses a left-hand thread to keep it from loosening. A turnbuckle has right-handed threads on one end and left-handed threads on the other. Some gas fittings are left-handed to prevent disastrous misconnections: oxygen fittings are right-handed, but acetylene, propane, and other flammable gases are unmistakably distinguished by left-handed fittings.

=== Mathematics ===
In trigonometry and mathematics in general, plane angles are conventionally measured counterclockwise, starting with 0° or 0 radians pointing directly to the right (or east), and 90° pointing straight up (or north). However, in navigation, compass headings increase clockwise around the compass face, starting with 0° at the top of the compass (the northerly direction), with 90° to the right (east).

A circle defined parametrically in a positive Cartesian plane by the equations x = cos t and y = sin t is traced counterclockwise as the angle t increases in value, from the right-most point at t = 0. An alternative formulation with sin and cos swapped gives a clockwise trace from the upper-most point, where t can be considered akin to a compass heading.

=== Games and activities ===
In general, most card games, board games, parlor games, and multiple team sports play in a clockwise turn rotation in Western Countries and Latin America and there is typically resistance to playing counterclockwise. Traditionally, and for the most part today, turns pass counterclockwise in many Asian countries. In Western countries, when speaking and discussion activities take place in a circle, the position of the speaker tends to move clockwise, even though there is no requirement that it do so. Unlike with games, there is usually no objection if turns begin to move counterclockwise.

Notably, the game of baseball is played counterclockwise.

== Alternative, normal right/left rotation ==
As an alternative to using a clock to describe the rotation of a body, it is possible to use the right/left hand rule to determine the rotation. The thumb shall point in the normal direction of the surface in question and the four remaining fingers in the direction of the rotation of the surface. The resulting direction of the rotation is thereby

- Normal right rotation = counterclockwise
- Normal left rotation = clockwise

== See also ==
- Handedness
- Chirality (physics), Chirality (chemistry)
- Circle orientation
- Curve orientation
- Inner/outer orientation
- Optical isomerism
- Retrograde motion
- Relative direction
