= Olszowa, Łódź Voivodeship =

Olszowa
- Village
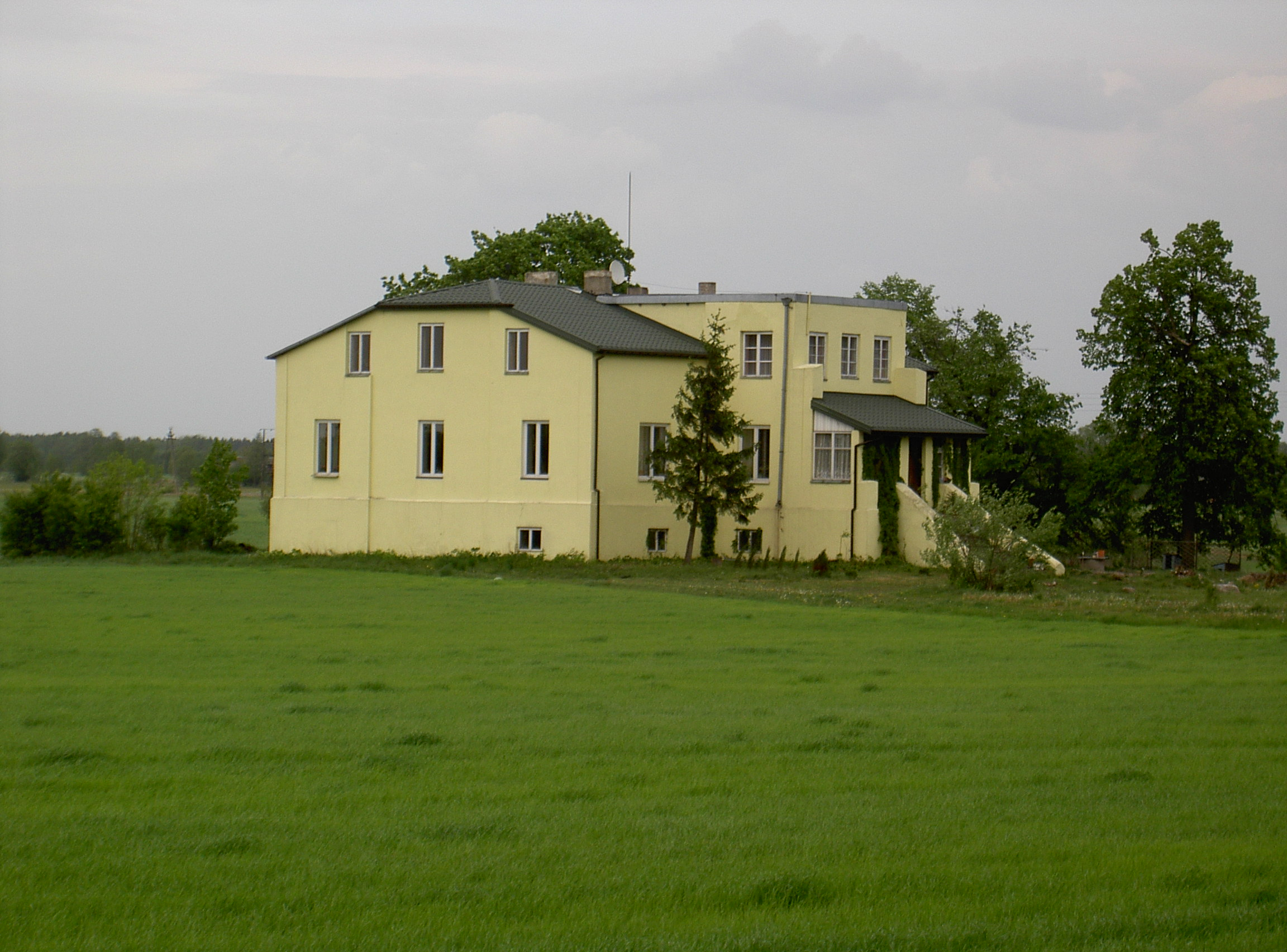
- House of former folwark Olszowa owner

- Location within Poland
- Coordinates: 51°35′20″N 19°51′34″E
- Country: Poland
- Voivodeship: Łódź
- County: Tomaszów
- Gmina: Ujazd

Olszowa [ɔlˈʂɔva] is a village in the administrative district of Gmina Ujazd, within Tomaszów County, Łódź Voivodeship, in central Poland.

A small creek of Pańkówka (later called Bielina) flows through Olszowa.

== History ==
The first written note of Olszowa comes from a document of archbishop Zbylut in 1379. In 1406 Ścibor Bielina of Wola Drzazgowa bought Olszowa from Klemens of Wykno for 30 pieces of silver (grzywna). Ścibor had three sons Michał, Wacław and Wojciech. They all were noted in 1420–1421 as owners of Olszowa. In 1924 king Jagiełło allowed the three brothers to transfer Olszowa to ius sredense. Olszowa is also mentioned in 1429 when bishop Wojciech Jastrzębiec (on 5 September 1429 in Mnichowiec near Skierniewice) separated villages Olszowa and Popielawy from the parish of Małcz and on their basis and Ujazd, which newly obtained town rights (on 15 May 1428), created a new parish of Ujazd.

In ca. 1445 Jan of Gutków (coat of arms Prus II) married Dorota a daughter of Wojciech Bielina and became an owner of shares in Olszowa belonging to the Bielina's. Besides little is known about Olszowa in the medieval period. In a court record of Brzeziny district one can read that in 1471 Stanisław of Gutków and Olszowa was sentenced to reimburse Piotr the citizen of Ujazd with 43 grzywna, the value of cattle, horses, sown seeds and other things. In 1488–1498 Marcin, a citizen of Ujazd, sued Wojciech of Olszowa and Gutków for compensation for his father's death of which Jakub Skórka a peasant of Olszowa was responsible. In that period the owners of Olszowa begun using the name Olszowski.

Their descendant was Walerian Olszowski (*1587–†1650). Walerian's grandfather was Piotr Olszowski. His father was Marcin Olszowski who married Elżbieta Modrzewska a daughter of Andrzej Frycz Modrzewski (*1503-†1572). Walerian served as podkomorzy of Wenden, podstoli of Wieluń and castellan of Spycimierz. With his second wife Zofia Dunin he had four sons: Andrzej, Hieronim, Zygmunt, Mikołaj and a daughter Katarzyna. His other sons held important ranks but Andrzej Olszowski (*27 Jan. 1621 – †29 Aug. 1677) reached the position of archbishop of Gniezno and primate of Poland (1674–1677). He was the one who crowned Jan III Sobieski for the king of Poland (at Wawel on 2 February 1676). Andrzej Olszowski was the founder of St. Adalbert church in Ujazd finished in 1680 (by his uncle's son Jan Olszowski, the castellan of Brzeziny), where a memorial plaque leaves no doubts about Andrzej's birthplace (Andream in Olszowa Olszowski ...Hic ob vicinitatem nativae Olszoviae fronte levatus basilicam hanc..). Walerian is buried at Stolec in the church of St. Lawrence where a sculptured tombstone in his memory is built in.

The next proven owner of Olszowa was Marcin Konstanty Olszowski (*1643–†1687 or 1689), a son of Mikołaj Olszowski and grandson of Walerian and then Andrzej Olszowski, starosta of Wieluń (1703–1719), a son of Hieronim Olszowski and grandson of Walerian. He had no heir and Olszowa was taken over by Wiktor Olszowski the son of Stanisław, castellan of Wieluń and grandson of Walerian's brother.

In 1817–1822 the property of Olszowa was split into five villages: Olszowa, Helenów, Maksymów, Stasiolas and Olszowa-Piaski. In 1827 Olszowa had 17 houses and population of 159. In 1886 the village of Olszowa had 16 houses and 112 dwellers and the folwark had 8 houses and 56 dwellers.

In 1899 the owner of folwark Olszowa was Julian Szczesław Malcz. In 1916 the owner was already Bolesław Malcz, the son of Julian and brother of Lucjan, a sublieutenant of a Polish unit of French Foreign Legion and World War I hero.

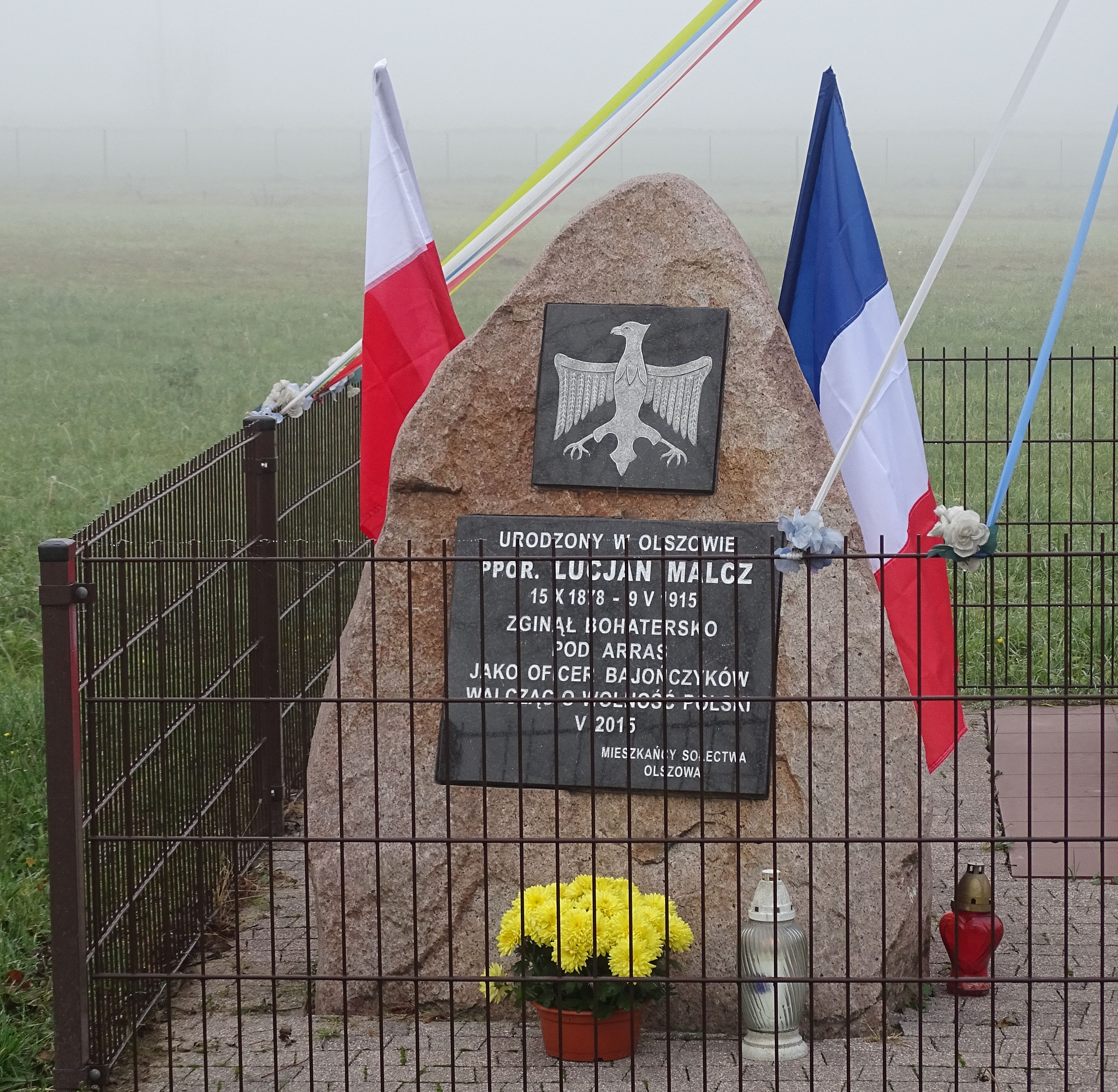
Lucjan Malcz monument in Olszowa

B. Malcz and his wife Leonia Zofia Wanda (born Moszyńska) had three children: sons Zbigniew and Stanisław and daughter Elżbieta (later known as Elzbieta Temple). B. Malcz was an active citizen. In 1906, during martial law in guberniya of Piotrków, he was sentenced to three months of prison for dictating the resolution of gmina Łazisko council, in 1916 he was a member of a Social Care Council of Łódź district (Łódzka Okręgowa Rada Opiekuńcza), a member of the Sienkiewicz memorial committee then a chairman of the board of fire brigade Ujazd (1917–1925). His most prominent position yet was membership of the Council of State of the Kingdom of Poland (1918). In the 1930s, after Boleslaw's death in 1927, the folwark was sold to a consortium of three owners and the Malcz's left Olszowa. In the beginning of WWII they all landed in England. After the war the distillery and mill were nationalized and closed. All machinery was removed in 1956. The remaining building was used for some time as a shelter for a mobile cinema and room for village gatherings. The building on the opposite side of the road housed GRN and a small post-office. Due to inadequate maintenance the buildings slowly went to ruins and now only a few walls remain.

The villages' last soltyses were Józef Adamus (shortly before and during the war), Józef Goździk, Władysław Ścieszko, Sławomir Socha, Zofia Socha and now Wojciech Żygota. Electricity was installed in the village in 1963–64. Earlier the only source of light was kerosene lamps. Running water pipes were installed in 2008 subsidized in part by the European Union.

== Education ==
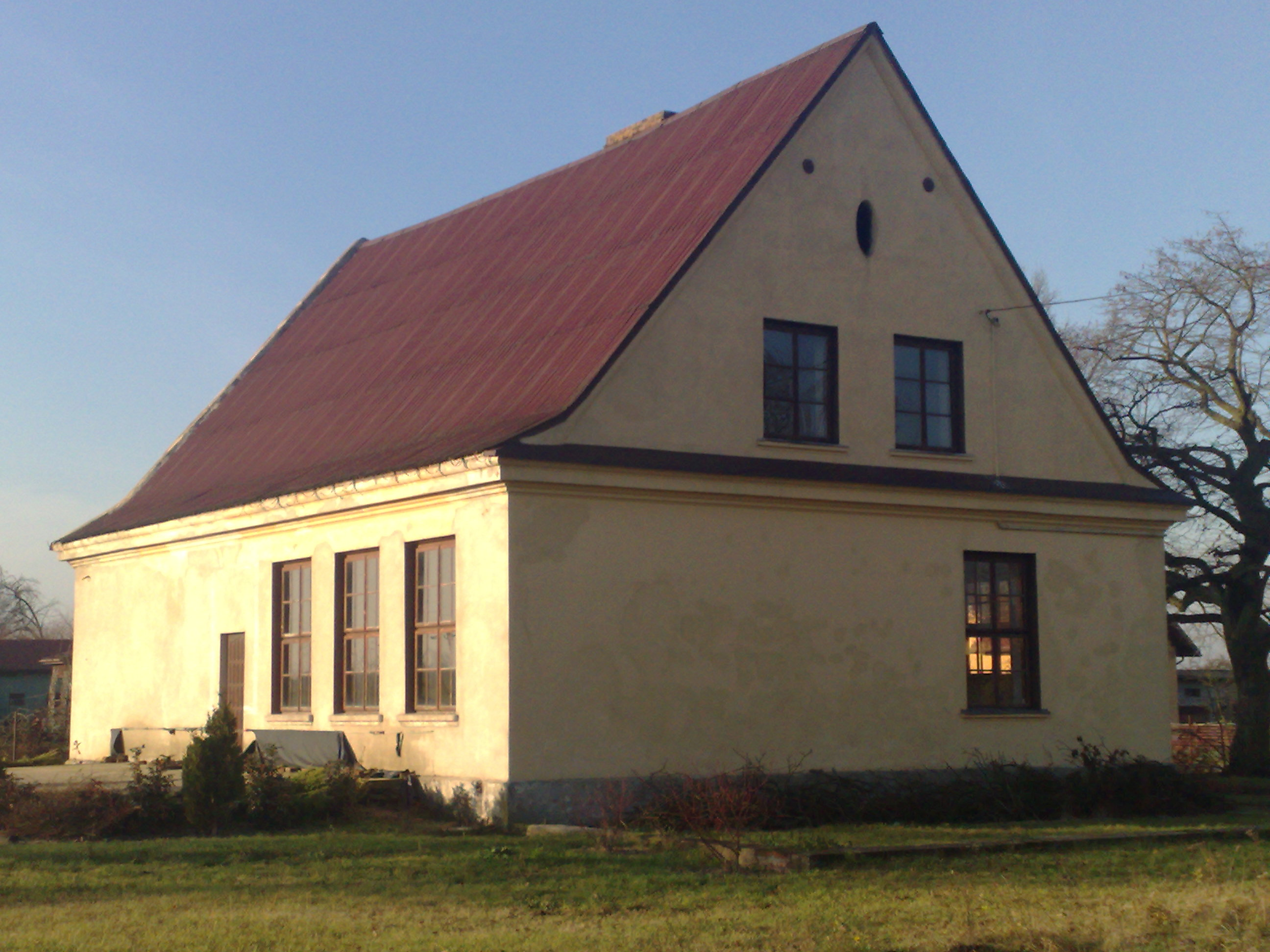
Building of the primary school of Olszowa

The public Primary School of Olszowa was built in 1927–28. The building design was the one duplicated in several villages of middle-war Poland. It contained three classrooms at ground floor, school office and two apartments of a schoolmaster and teacher upstairs. Initially it had three classes only. Among first teachers were Seredyńska and Woźniak (schoolmaster). Wójcik, Nowak, and Leon Sowa were the teachers of that period. Other teachers were Ireneusz Gałecki and A. Gralak. L. Sowa was the last schoolmaster before World War II. He and his wife Kazimiera were teachers also under German occupation until early 1942. They both were active in underground structures of the Home Army and were arrested by the German occupants. Leon Sowa was imprisoned (number 44667) and was murdered in Auschwitz on 13 August 1942. Kazimiera Sowa was held in Ravensbrück. She was brought into Ravensbrück concentration camp on 21 June 1942. She survived the war and taught shortly after the war in the same school. After the Sowas' arrest the teacher in Olszowa school was Helena Hekowa. The school returned to service after the war. In 1973 it was passed to Gmina Ujazd. Halina Kula was the last schoolmaster. The school was terminated in the 1980s. The building was sold by gmina Ujazd to a private owner.

=== School in pre-war times ===
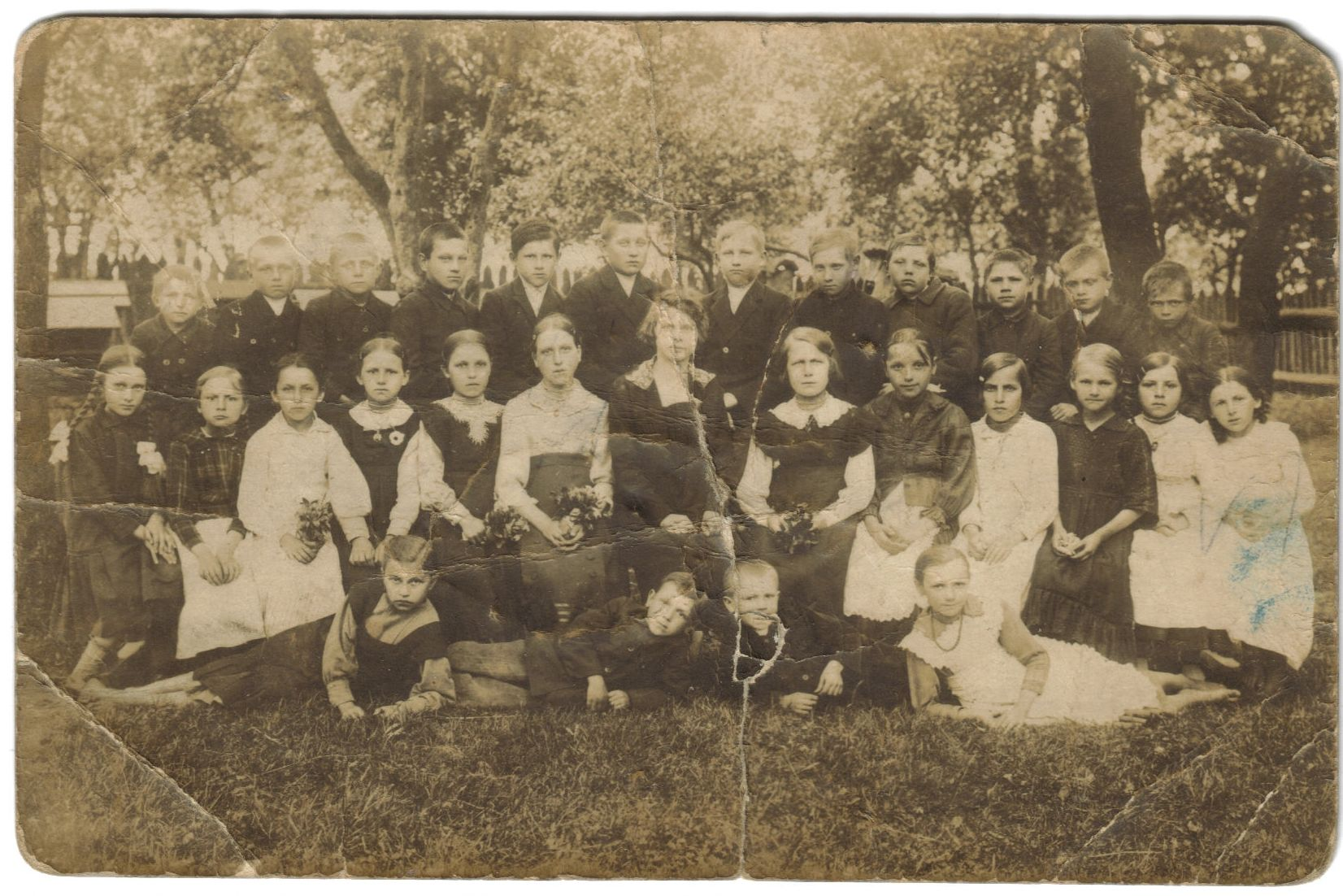
School photo of 1928 - the first year of new school. Teacher unknown.

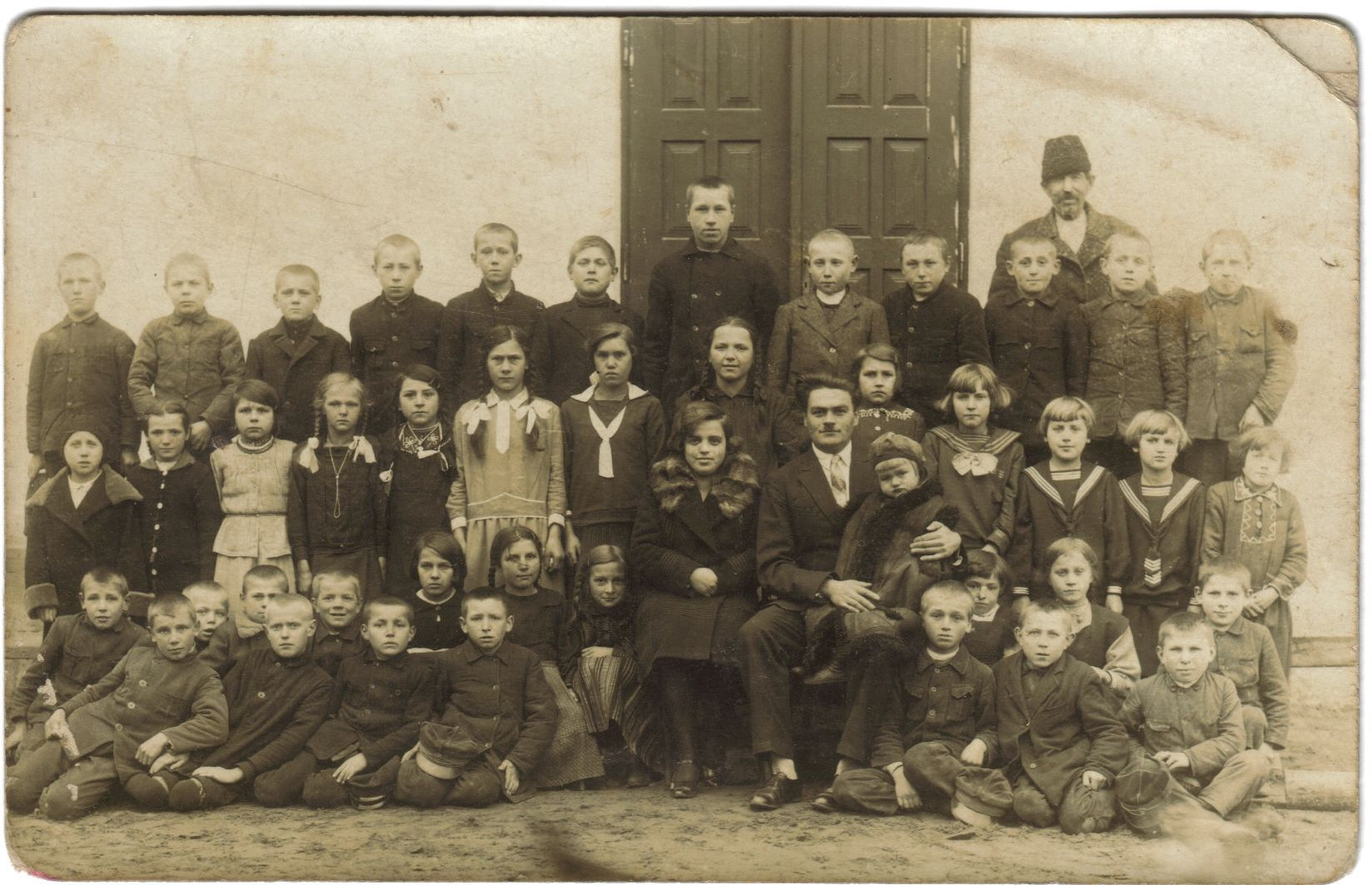
School photo of 1930. Teachers: Seredyńska and Woźniak.

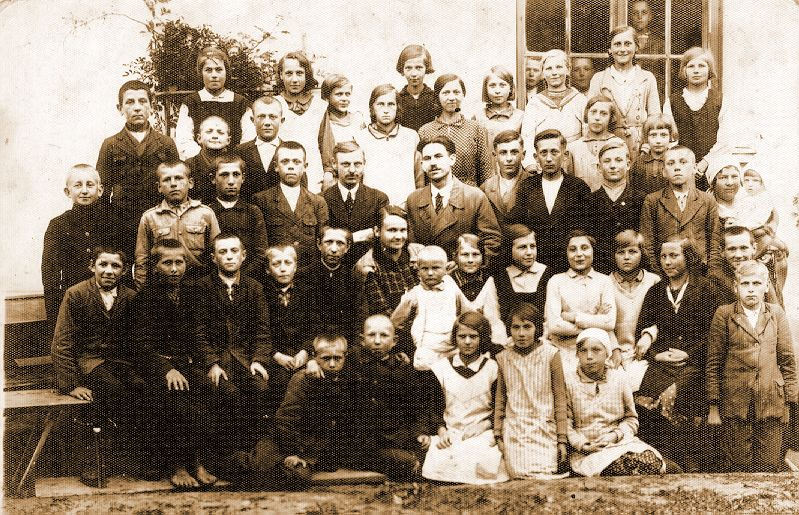
School photo of 1936. Teachers: Leon Sowa (left), A. Gralak (right), Kazimiera Sowa (below).

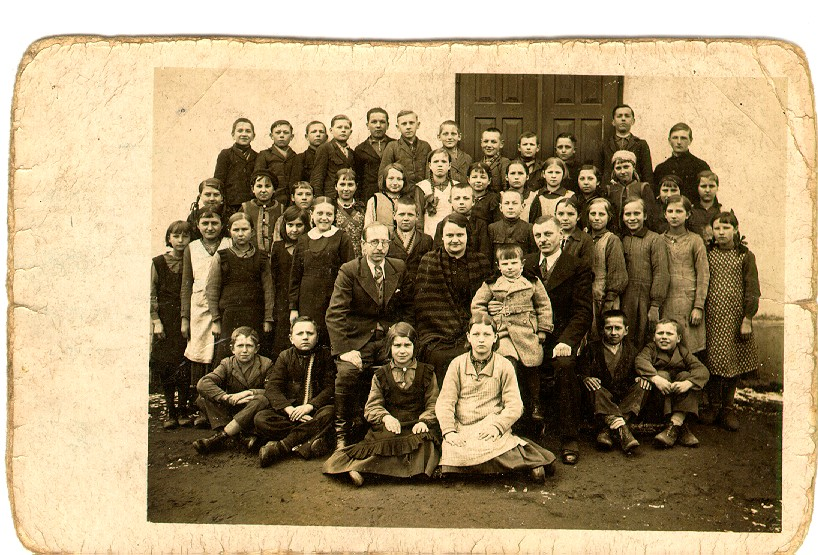
School photo of 1938. Teachers: Ireneusz Gałecki (left), Kazimiera Sowa (middle), Leon Sowa (right)
