= J. J. G. Alexander =

Medieval manuscript expert

Jonathan James Graham Alexander, FBA (born August 1935), known in print as J. J. G. Alexander, is a medievalist and expert on manuscripts, "one of the most profound and wide-ranging of all historians of illuminated manuscripts".

== Education and career ==
Jonathan Alexander matriculated at the University of Oxford in the 1960s (BA, MA, D.Phil.) before becoming a Lecturer and Reader in History of Art at the University of Manchester from 1971 to 1987.

Alexander edited the Survey of Manuscripts Illuminated in the British Isles from 1975 onwards and wrote the first volume of the six volume series, Insular Manuscripts, 6th to the 9th century, just one of the many books and articles he has written on manuscripts. The outcome of the survey he undertook with Elzbieta Temple of the illuminated manuscripts held in the collections of the University of Oxford colleges resulted in the co-authored book Illuminated Manuscripts in the Oxford College Libraries, the University Archives and the Taylor Institution which was published in 1985. This work is said to be the inspiration for the more recent cataloguing of the manuscripts in the University of Cambridge collection with which J.J.G. Alexander was also involved.

In 1987 Alexander worked on the exhibition Age of Chivalry: Art in Plantagenet England, 1200-1400 at the Royal Academy of Arts and co-edited the catalogue with Paul Binski (see below).

He moved to New York in 1988 becoming Professor of Fine Arts at New York University Institute of Fine Arts and was awarded the Sherman Fairchild Professorship of Fine Arts in 2002. He is now Emeritus Professor of Fine Arts following his retirement from university life in 2011.

== Honours ==
1981 Fellow of the Society of Antiquaries

1982-1983 Lyell Lecturer in Bibliography at the University of Oxford

1984-1985 Sandars Readership in Bibliography at Cambridge University

1985 Fellow, British Academy

1995 Honorary Fellow, Pierpont Morgan Library

1995-1996 Guggenheim Fellowship

1999 Fellow, Medieval Academy of America

2002 J. Clawson Mills Art History Fellowship, Metropolitan Museum of Art, New York

The festschrift collection Tributes to Jonathan J.G. Alexander: the Making and Meaning of Illuminated Medieval & Renaissance Manuscripts, Art & Architecture (London: Harvey Miller, 2006, ISBN 978-1-872501-47-5) was edited by Susan L’Engle and Gerald B. Guest. Contributors included Walter Cahn and Madeline H. Caviness.

== Selected works ==
- (ed. with Otto Pächt) Illuminated Manuscripts in the Bodleian Library, Oxford, 3 vols.1966
- Italian Renaissance Illuminations, New York: Braziller, 1977, ISBN 9780807608647
- Insular Manuscripts, 6th to the 9th century, London: H. Miller, 1978. Survey of manuscripts Illuminated in the British Isles vol. 1, ISBN 0198173814
- The Decorated Letter, New York: Braziller, 1978, ISBN 0500271380
- (ed. with T. Julian Brown and Joan Gibbs) Collected writings of Francis Wormald. 2 vols, New York: Oxford University Press, 1984–88.
- (with Elzbieta Temple) Illuminated Manuscripts in the Oxford College Libraries, the University Archives and the Taylor Institution, Oxford : Clarendon, 1985, ISBN 0198173814
- (ed. with Paul Binski) Age of Chivalry: Art in Plantagenet England, 1200-1400, London: Royal Academy of Arts, 1987, ISBN 0297791826
- Medieval Illuminators and their methods of work, New Haven: Yale University Press, 1994.
- (ed.) The Painted Page : Italian Renaissance Book Illumination, 1450-1550, New York: Prestel, 1994, ISBN 3791313851
- (ed. with James H. Marrow and Lucy Freeman Sandler) The Splendor of the Word: Medieval and Renaissance Illuminated Manuscripts at the New York Public Library, New York: New York Public Library, 2005, ISBN 190537500X

Professor Alexander wrote the obituary of T. S. R. Boase, a former director of the Courtauld Institute of Art, for The British Academy.

Alexander has also contributed photographs to the Conway Library that are currently being digitised by the Courtauld Institute of Art, as part of the Courtauld Connects project.
