= T. S. R. Boase =

British art historian (1898–1974)

Boase in 1950.

Thomas Sherrer Ross Boase MC FBA (31 August 1898 – 14 April 1974) was a British art historian, university teacher, and Vice-Chancellor of Oxford University.

== Early life and education ==
Thomas Boase was born in Dundee, Scotland, to Charles Millet Boase (d. 1921), operator of a bleaching mill at Claverhouse, outside Dundee, of which the Boase family were part-owners, and his wife Anne. Boase was educated at a day preparatory school and then at Rugby School in England (1912–17).

=== Oxford ===
He won a scholarship to Oxford for an essay on Lorenzo de' Medici. Boase studied Modern History at Magdalen College, Oxford, from 1919 to 1921. At Oxford he studied under the historian Francis Fortescue Urquhart (1868–1934). Boase was a Fellow and Tutor at Hertford College from 1922 to 1937.

== Involvement in World War I and II ==
=== World War I ===
He fought on the Western Front during World War I in the Oxford and Buckinghamshire Light Infantry (1917–19) and was awarded the Military Cross.

=== World War II ===
During World War II, he worked in the Government Code and Cypher School at Bletchley Park, followed by the RAF in Cairo, Egypt, from 1939 to 1941. He was then in charge of British Council activities in the Middle East, also based in Cairo, from 1943 to 1945.

== Career ==
=== Courtauld Institute of Art ===
From 1937 to 1947, Boase was Director of the Courtauld Institute of Art in London. While at the Courtauld he contributed photographs that are now held in the Conway Library of art and architecture. During this period, he was also Professor of History of Art at the University of London.

=== Later life ===
From 1947 to 1968, Boase was President of Magdalen College. In 1948, he contributed to the Samuel Courtauld Memorial Exhibition at Tate Britain. He was a Trustee of the National Gallery (1947–53) and the British Museum (1950–69). Boase was involved in a 'scandal' while Chairman of the Trustees of the National Gallery in 1952. He served as Vice-Chancellor of Oxford University from 1958 to 1960. Boase became a Fellow of the British Academy in 1961. He was Slade Professor of Fine Art at Oxford for 1963–64. In 1967, he was elected a member of the American Philosophical Society. He was also a member of the Advisory Council of the Victoria and Albert Museum (1947–70).

== Death ==
His obituary for The British Academy was written by J.J.G.Alexander, another Conway Library photographer.

== Partial Bibliography ==
- Boniface VIII, Series: Makers of the Middle Ages, Constable, 1933.
- St. Francis of Assisi, Series: Great Lives (74), Duckworth, 1936.
- English Romanesque Illuminations, Oxford University Press, 1951.
- The Oxford History of English Art : Vol III. English Art, 1100–1216, Oxford University Press, 1953.
- English Illumination of the Thirteenth and Fourteenth Centuries, Bodleian Library, Oxford, 1954.
- The York Psalter in the Library of the Hunterian Museum, Glasgow, Faber & Faber Ltd, 1962.
- Macklin and Bowyer, Warburg Institute, 1963.
- Castles and Churches of the Crusading Kingdom, Oxford University Press, 1967.
- St Francis of Assisi, Thames & Hudson, 1968.
- Kingdoms and Strongholds of the Crusaders, Thames and Hudson, 1971.
- Death in the Middle Ages: Mortality, Judgment and Remembrance, Thames and Hudson, 1972.
- Nebuchadnezzar: 34 paintings and 18 drawings, (with Arthur Boyd), Thames and Hudson, 1972.

Academic offices
Preceded by William George Constable	Director of the Courtauld Institute of Art; 1936 to 1947	Succeeded by Anthony Blunt
Preceded by Henry Thomas Tizard	President of Magdalen College, Oxford; 1947 to 1968	Succeeded by James Griffiths
Preceded by John Cecil Masterman	Vice-Chancellor of Oxford University; 1958 to 1960	Succeeded by Arthur Lionel Pugh Norrington
