= St. Mary's Church, Gdańsk =

Church in Gdańsk, Poland

Coordinates: 54°20′59.1″N 18°39′13.3″E

St Mary's Church
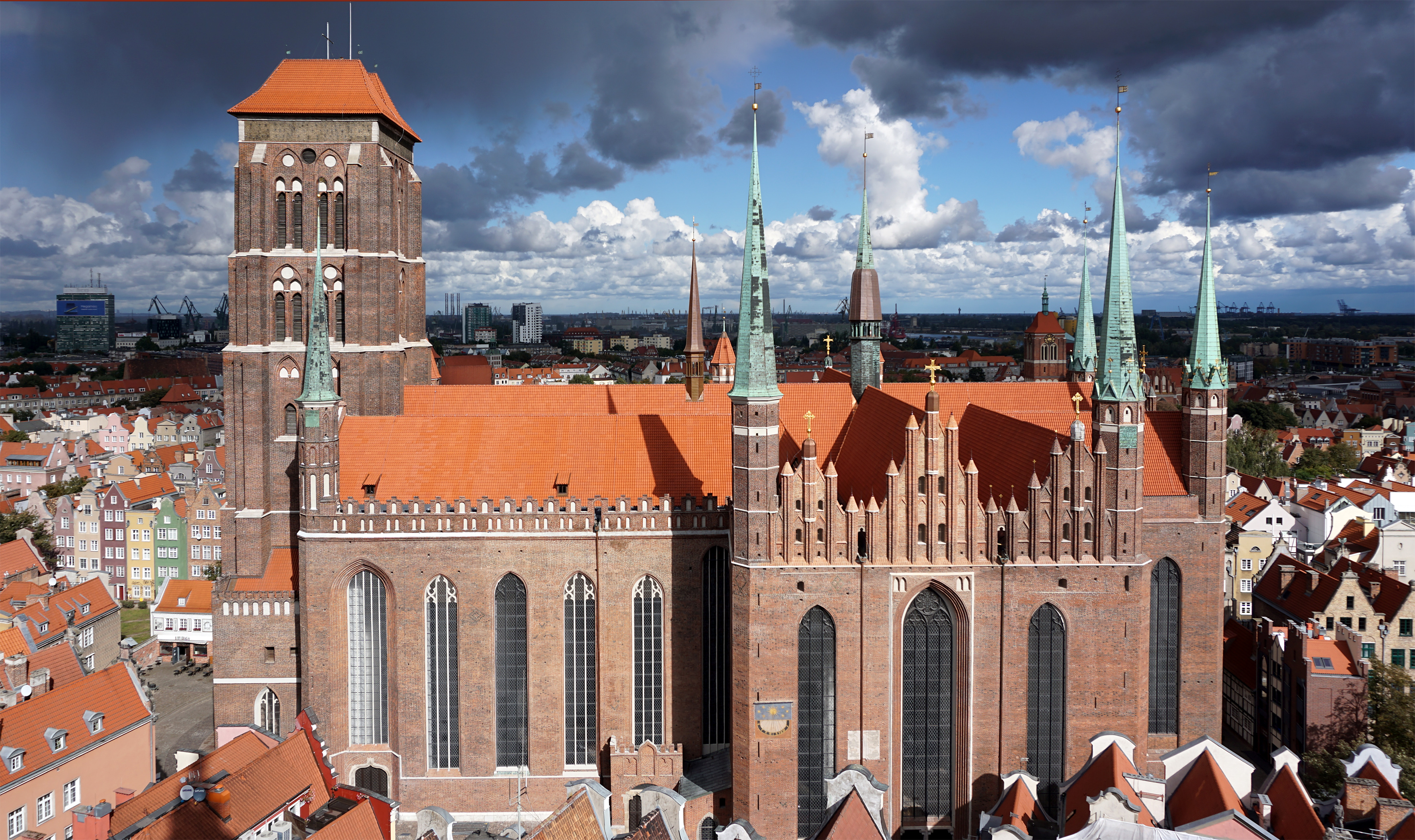
- South view, 2018
- St Mary's Church
- Address: Podkramarska 5, Śródmieście, Gdańsk
- Country: Poland
- Denomination: Catholic Church
- Previous denomination: Lutheran
- Sui iuris church: Latin Church
- Website: Official website

History
- Status: Parish church Co-cathedral; Minor basilica
- Dedication: Assumption of Mary

Architecture
- Functional status: active
- Architect(s): Heinrich Ungeradin, Hans Brandt, Heinrich Haetzl, Tylman Gamerski (Royal Chapel)
- Architectural type: Hall church
- Style: Brick Gothic
- Years built: 1379–1502
- Groundbreaking: 1343
- Completed: 1502

Specifications
- Capacity: 25,000–30,000
- Length: 105.5 m (346 ft 2 in)
- Width: 66 m (216 ft 6 in)
- Materials: Brick

Administration
- Archdiocese: Gdańsk
- Parish: Assumption of Mary in Gdańsk

Historic Monument of Poland
- Designated: 1994-09-08
- Part of: Gdańsk – city within the 17th-century fortifications
- Reference no.: M.P. 1994 nr 50 poz. 415

St. Mary's Church (Polish: Bazylika Mariacka, German: St. Marienkirche) (Note: Formally known as the Basilica of the Assumption of the Blessed Virgin Mary (Polish: Bazylika konkatedralna Wniebowzięcia Najświętszej Maryi Panny).) is a Roman Catholic church and co-cathedral located in central Gdańsk, Poland. Completed in 1502 in the Brick Gothic architectural style, it is one of the world's largest brick churches and among the city's most important landmarks, known to its inhabitants as the Crown of Gdańsk (Polish: Korona Gdańska). Together with Oliwa Cathedral, it serves the Archdiocese of Gdańsk.

The groundbreaking ceremony took place in 1343, however, the construction of the present church began in 1379. St. Mary's is an aisled hall church with a transept; its exterior was largely influenced by other churches and temples built across cities or townships in proximity to the Baltic Sea that were part of the Hanseatic League. Between 1536 and 1572, St. Mary's Church was used for Catholic and Lutheran services simultaneously. Additionally, a domed side chapel in the Baroque fashion was erected for the Kings of Poland and Catholic worship in the late 17th century.

With a seating capacity of over 25,000 and a volume of approximately 155,000 cubic metres (5,500,000 cu ft), it is one of the three largest brick churches ever constructed, along with San Petronio in Bologna and the Frauenkirche in Munich. It was also the second largest Lutheran church in the world from the 16th century until 1945. The structure is 105.5 metres (346 ft 2 in) long, and the nave is 41 metres (134 ft 6 in) wide; the total width of the church is 66 metres (216 ft 6 in). The internal height is estimated at 29 metres (95 ft 2 in) at maximum point.

== History ==
=== Beginnings, construction (14th–16th centuries) ===
According to tradition, as early as 1243 a wooden Church of the Assumption existed at this site, built by Swietopelk II, Duke of Pomerania.

The foundation stone for the new brick church was placed on 25 March 1343, the feast of the Annunciation. At first a six-span bay basilica with a low turret was built, erected from 1343 to 1360. Parts of the pillars and lower levels of the turret have been preserved from this building.

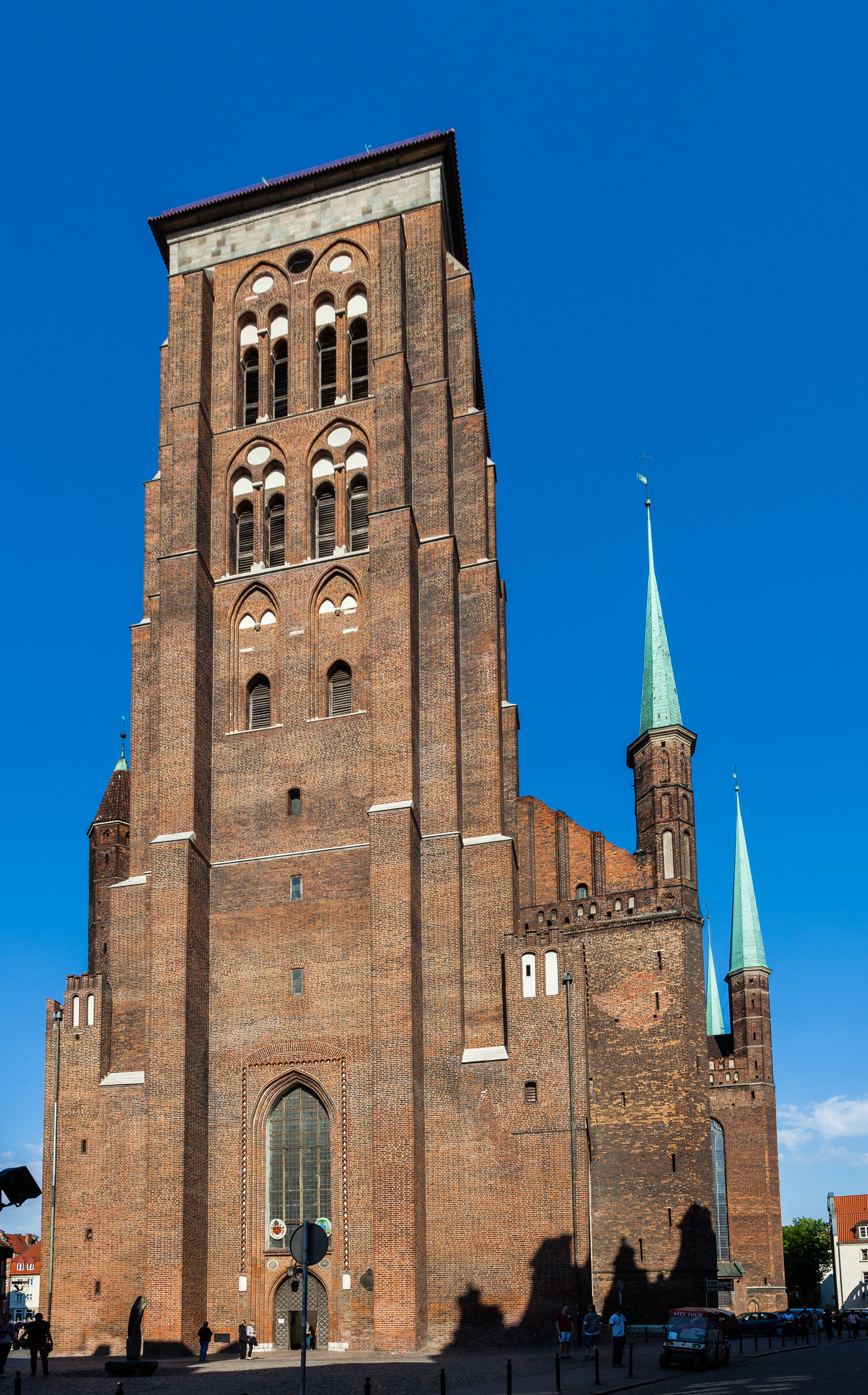
Frontal façade with the tower.

In 1379 the Danzig architect Heinrich Ungeradin and his team began construction of the present church. Their building shows some differences from St. Mary's Church in Lübeck, sometimes called the mother of all Brick Gothic churches dedicated to St. Mary in Hanseatic cities around the Baltic, and it has some details in common with Gothic brick churches in Flanders and the Netherlands. By 1447 the eastern part of the church was finished, and the tower was raised by two floors in the years 1452–1466. From 1485 the work was continued by Hans Brandt, who supervised the erection of the main nave core. After 1496, the structure was finally finished under Heinrich Haetzl, who supervised the construction of the vaulting.

=== Reformation (16th century) ===
In the course of the Reformation most people of Danzig adopted Lutheranism, among them the parishioners of St. Mary's. After a short wave of turbulent religious altercations in 1525 and 1526, in which the previous city council was overthrown, the new authorities favored a smooth transition to Lutheran religious practice. In 1529 the first Lutheran sermon was given in St. Mary's. From 1536 — in cooperation with Włocławek's Catholic officials — a Lutheran cleric was permanently employed at St. Mary's and both Lutheran services and Catholic masses were held. The Lutheran minister then began registering the births, deaths, and marriages of the congregation, and the oldest surviving register is that of burials starting in 1537.

In July 1557, King Sigismund II Augustus of Poland granted Danzig the religious privilege of celebrating communion with both bread and wine. Thereafter the City Council ended Catholic masses in all Danzig churches except St. Mary's, where Catholic masses continued until 1572. As part of the smooth transition Lutheran pastors and services at first also continued Catholic traditions, including using precious liturgical garments, such as chasubles. However Catholic traditions gradually were abandoned at St. Mary's. Danzig's Lutheran congregation, like others in northern Europe, stored the old liturgical garments, some of which survived.

The inventories of St. Mary's reflect usage of Catholic-style accessories in Danzig's early Lutheran services. The inventory of 1552 still mentions a great stock of garments and embroideries. The parishioners of St. Mary's formed a Lutheran congregation which - as part of Lutheran church polity - adopted a church order. A more elaborate church order (constitution) followed in 1612, the Alte Kirchenordnung. The first senior pastor (Erster Pfarrer, pastor primarius) of Danzig's Lutheran state church was Johannes Kittelius, pastor at St. Mary's between 1566 and 1590. The church officially was called Supreme Parish Church of St. Mary's (Oberpfarrkirche St. Marien), indicating its prominent position in the city.

=== Dispute with Kings of Poland ===
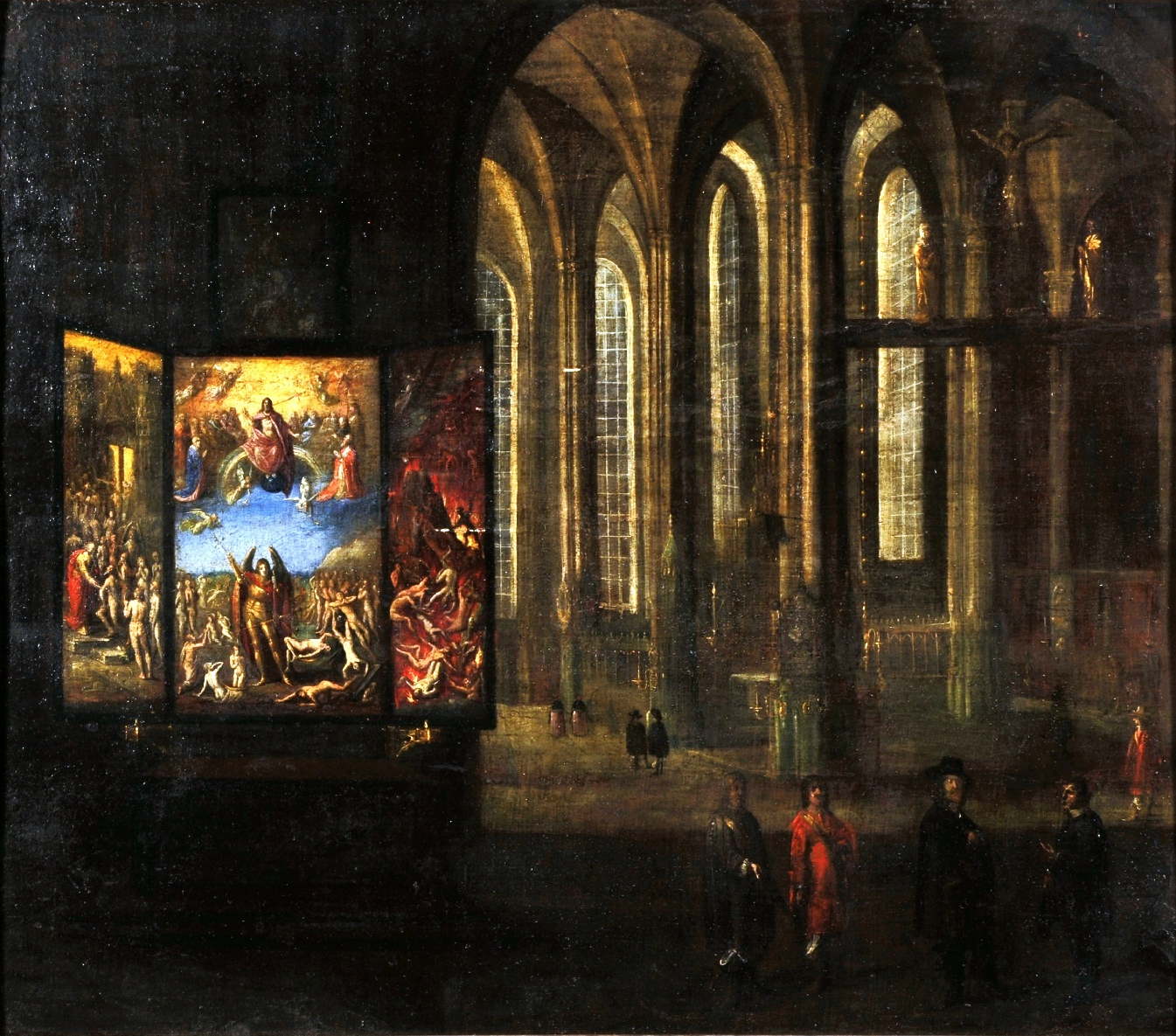
Interior of St. Mary's, 1635, by Bartholomäus Milwitz, also depicting the Last Judgment by Hans Memling.

Due to the anti-Bathory rebellion, in 1577 the Polish King Stephen Báthory imposed the Siege of Danzig (1577). The defense of its political position forced the city to hire mercenaries, who were so costly that the City Council confiscated gold and silver from the inhabitants and from the treasuries of the city and its Lutheran state church. Most of the gold and silver utensils of St. Mary's were melted down and minted to pay the mercenaries. An inventory of 1552 still recorded no less than 78 silver gilt chalices, 43 altar crucifixes, 24 great silver figures of saints and the like more. After 1577 most of it was gone. The Danzig rebellion ended in December 1577 with a compromise forcing the city to pay the king the sum of 200,000 florins. But the Polish monarch also recognised Danzig's religious freedom and Lutheran faith. As a compromise the jurisdiction over Danzig's Lutherans as to marital and sexual matters remained with Włocławek's Catholic officials.

In 1594, the Polish royal court tribunal attempted to restore Catholic services to St. Mary's, but the City Council rejected that approach. But as a compromise, since the Catholic kings of Poland had been the nominal heads of the City since the Second Peace of Thorn (1466), the Council authorised building the Baroque Catholic Royal Chapel. It was erected by Tylman van Gameren (Gamerski) and completed in 1681, near St. Mary's Church, for the king's Catholic service when he visited Gdańsk. With St. Mary's pastor Constantin Schütz (1646–1712) a moderate pietist theology replaced the previously dominant Lutheran orthodoxy.

=== Partitions, Prussia, Germany (1793–1920) ===
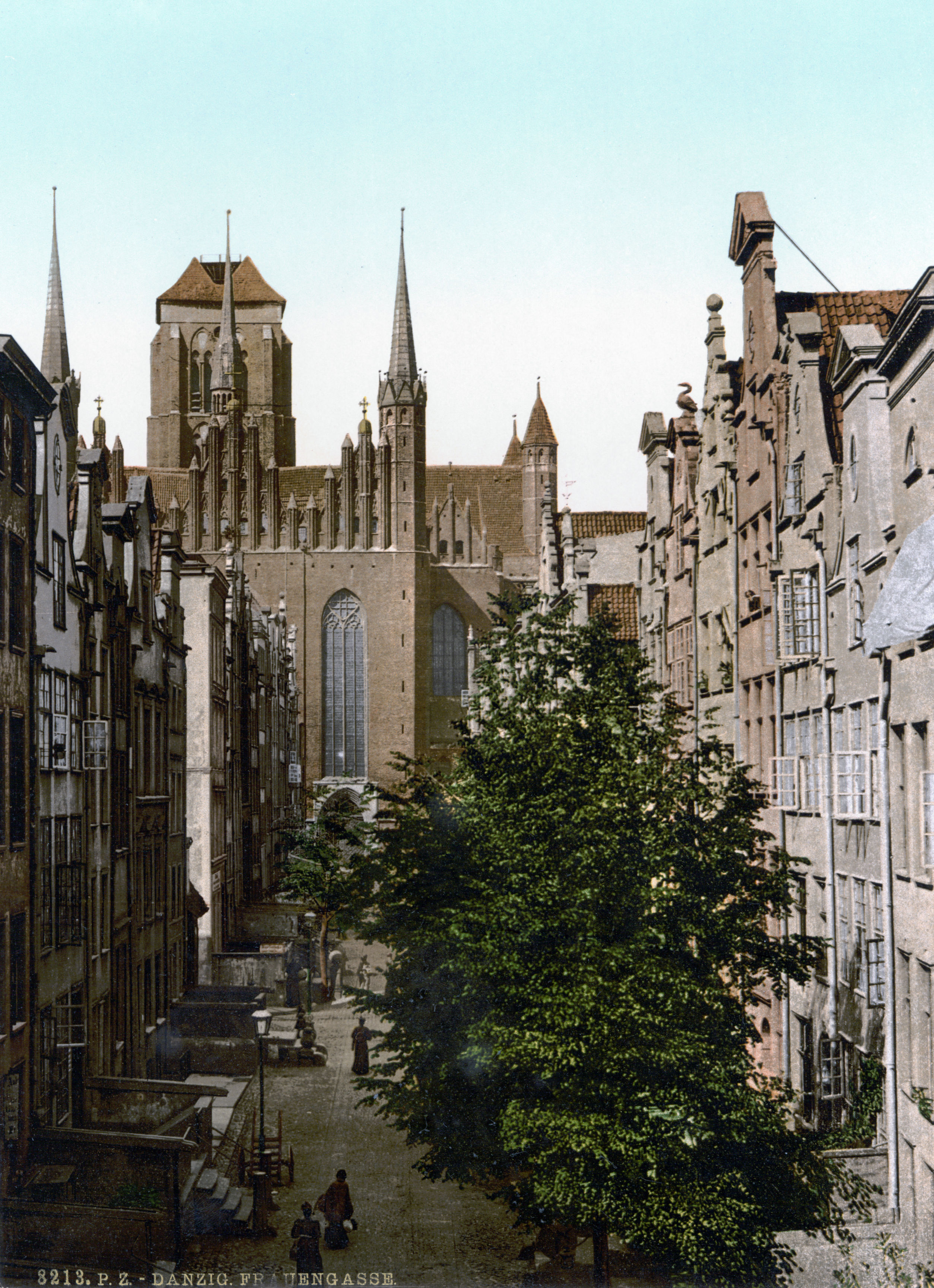
St. Mary's Church around 1900 seen from the then Frauengasse (now Mariacka Street).

In the course of the Partitions of Poland the city lost its autonomy in 1793, regaining it for a short period (1807–1814) as a Napoleonic client state, before it became part of the Kingdom of Prussia in 1815. The Prussian government integrated St. Mary's and all the Lutheran state church into the all-Prussian Lutheran church administration. In 1816 the Danzig Consistory was established taking on the tasks and some of the members of the Danzig spiritual ministerium. Danzig's then senior, and prime pastor at St. Mary's (1801–1827), Karl Friedrich Theodor Bertling, became a consistorial councillor in the church body. In 1817 the government imposed the union of Reformed and Lutheran congregations within the entire kingdom. First intended to win all these congregations to adopt a unified Protestant confession, the vast Lutheran majority insisted on retaining the Augsburg Confession, thus St. Mary's remained a Lutheran church and congregation, but joined the new umbrella of the Evangelical Church in Prussia in 1821, a regional Protestant church body of united administration but no common confession, comprising mostly Lutheran, but also some Reformed and united Protestant congregations.

In 1820, during Bertling's pastorate, long forgotten chests and cabinets in the sacristy were opened and the first medieval garments and liturgical decorations were rediscovered. In the 1830s more historic garments were found. At that time the congregation did not grasp the richness and rarity of these findings. So when Chaplain Franz Johann Joseph Bock, art historian and curator of the then Cologne Archdiocesan Museum, reviewed the discoveries he acquired a number of the best pieces from the congregation. Bock showed them in an exhibition in 1853. After his death some Danzig pieces from his personal collection were sold to London's Victoria and Albert Museum. These and also later sales to private collectors included cloths and vestments made of fabrics from ancient Mesopotamia and ancient Egypt, obtained during the Crusades; as well as renaissance wares from Venice, Florence and Lucca (more than 1000 items altogether).

In 1861–64 a Sexton named Hinz systematically searched chests, cabinets and other storages in chambers and rooms, also in the tower, and found many more historic liturgical garments. In the 1870s and 1880s the congregation sold more than 200 incomplete pieces, but also intact altar cloths and embroideries to the Berlin Museum of Decorative Arts. The remaining pieces of the garment collection, the so-called Danziger Paramentenschatz (Danzig Parament Treasure), mostly originate from the 150 years between 1350 and 1500.

The congregation also sold other artifacts, such as the winged triptych by Jan van Wavere, acquired by Archduke Maximilian, now held in the Church of the Teutonic Order in Vienna, and the sculpture of the Madonna and Child by Michael of Augsburg from the main altar, sold to Count Alfons Sierakowski, now in the chapel in Waplewo Wielkie. In addition, the Prussian authorities melted down gold and silver reliquaries for reuse.

=== Free City, World War II (1920–1945) ===
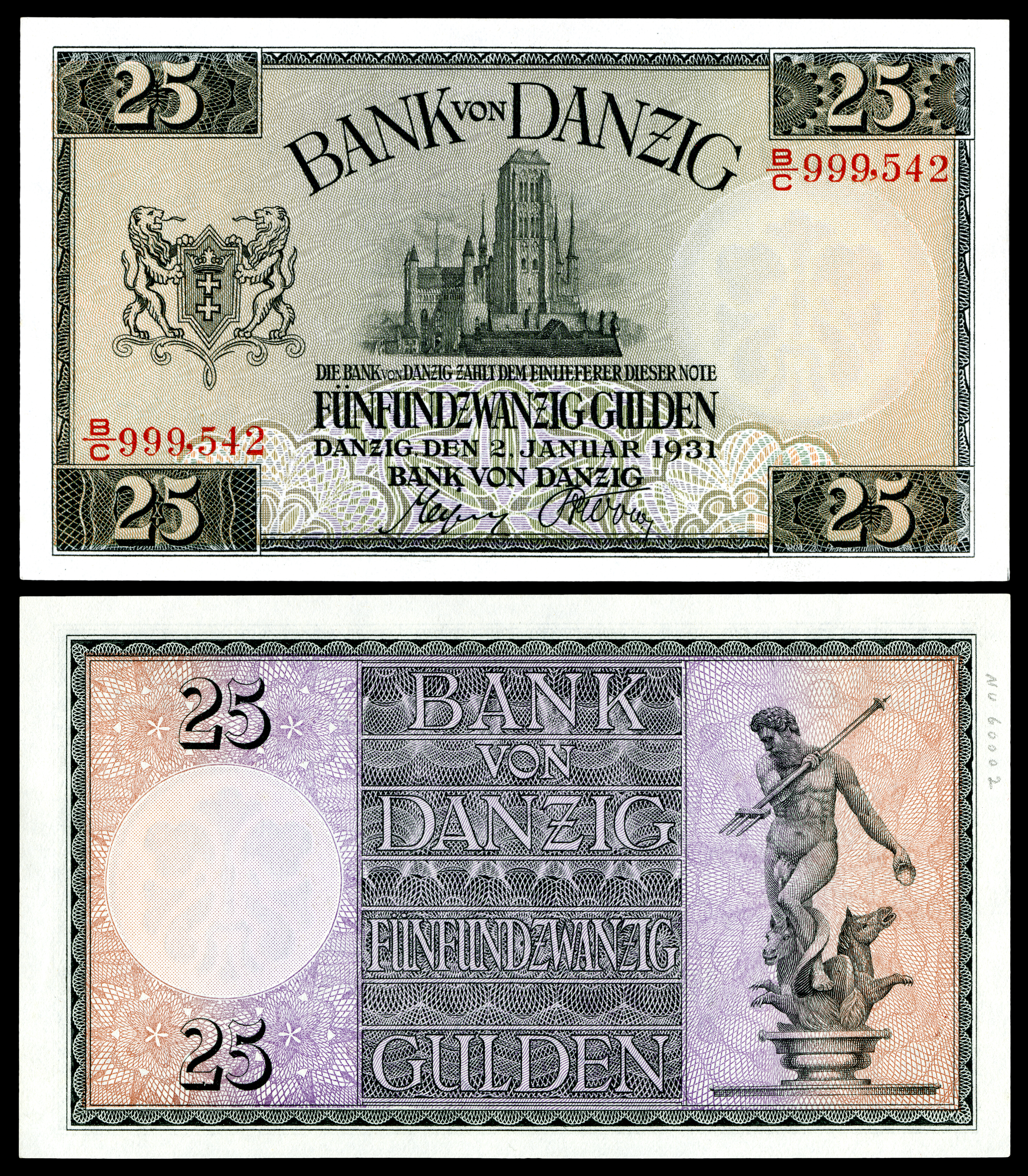
25 Danzig Gulden note of 1931 depicting St. Mary's Church, then the Protestant Marienkirche.

Until World War II, the church interior and exterior were well preserved. Between 1920 and 1940 St. Mary's became the principal church within the Protestant Regional Synodal Federation of the Free City of Danzig. In this time the presbytery (board of the congregation) discerned the value of its parament collection and prompted its cataloguing. During a renovation in the 1920s more historic garments and altar cloths were found. From 1930 to 1933 Walter Mannowsky, then director of the City Museum (now housed in the National Museum, Gdańsk), delivered a detailed four volume inventory of the Paramentenschatz. It was then presented in the St. Barbara Chapel of St. Mary's. In 1936 the Paramentenschatz was moved to a newly equipped room in the City Museum with a controlled climate, since the Barbara Chapel was too damp. The Paramentenschatz remained property of the congregation, presented on loan in the city museum (Stadtmuseum).

Beginning in the third war year 1942, major items of Danzig's cultural heritage were dismantled and demounted in coordination with the cultural heritage curator (Konservator). The presbytery of St. Mary's Church agreed to remove items like archive files and artworks such as altars, paintings, epitaphs, mobile furnishings to places outside the city. Meanwhile, churches in Danzig as elsewhere in Germany, and in German-occupied areas, saw their church bells requisitioned as non-ferrous metal for war production. Bells were classified according to historical and/or artistical value and those categorised the least valuable and cast after 1860, and especially those requisitioned in occupied areas, were melted down the first.

The church was severely damaged late in World War II, during the storming of Danzig city by the Red Army in March 1945. The wooden roof burned completely and most of the ceiling fell in. Fourteen of the large vaults collapsed. The windows were destroyed. In places the heat was so intense that some of the bricks melted, especially in the upper parts of the tower, which acted as a giant chimney. All remaining bells crashed down when their bell cages collapsed in the fire. The floor of the church, containing priceless gravestone slabs, was torn apart, allegedly by Soviet soldiers attempting to loot the corpses buried underneath.

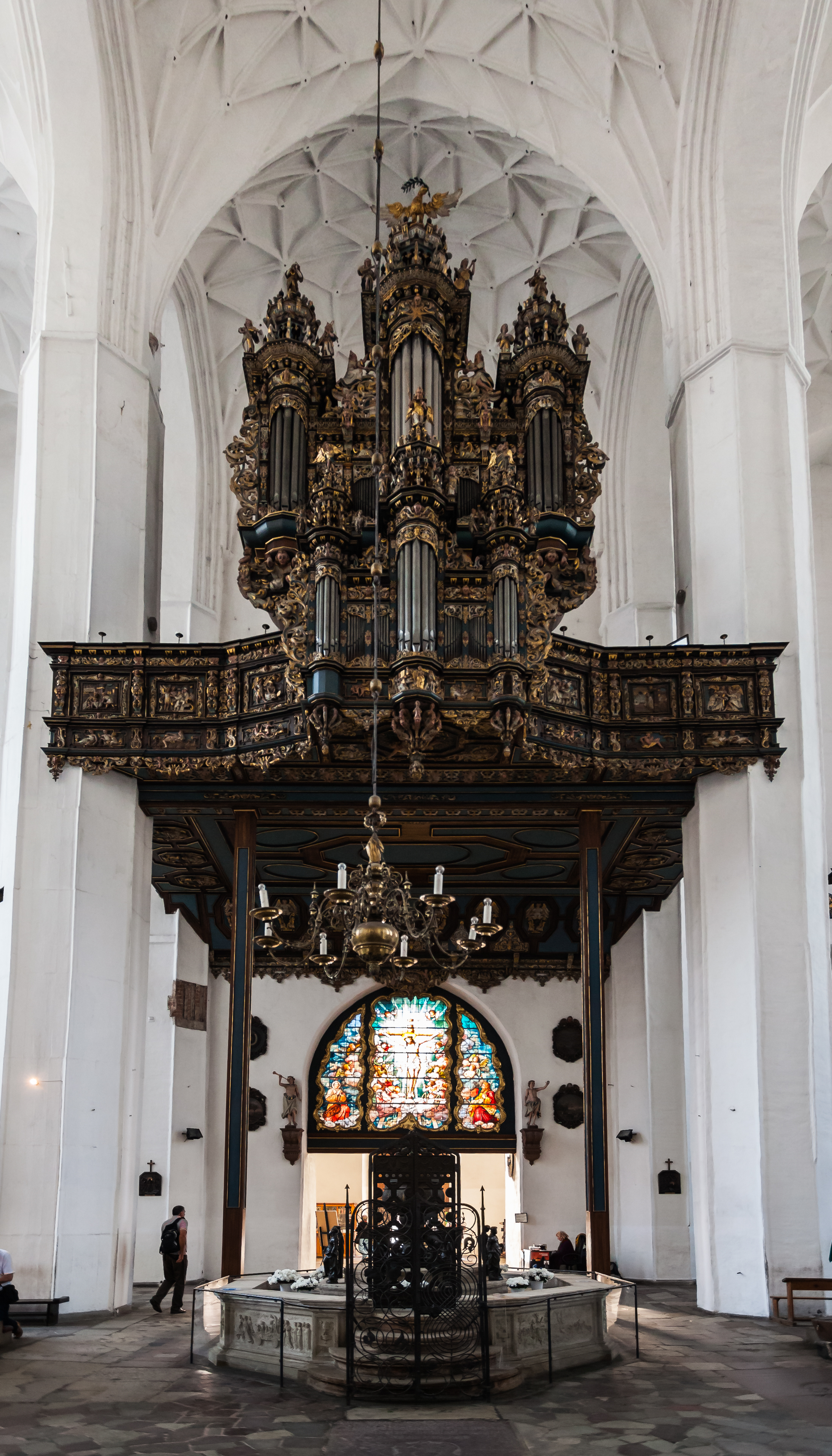
Organ inside the church.

By the end of the Second World War many German parishioners of St. Mary's fled westwards, and also the parament treasure was evacuated to the west. In March 1945 Poland began expelling the remaining ethnic Germans in the city even before the border changes promulgated at the Potsdam Conference reassigned the city to Poland. Most of St. Mary's surviving parishioners wound up in the British occupation zone in northern Germany. Lübeck became a center for exiled Germans. All property of St. Mary's Lutheran congregation in Danzig was expropriated and its cemetery despoiled. However, two unsmelted bells of St. Mary's, dating from 1632 and 1719, later were found in the so-called Hamburg bell cemetery (Glockenfriedhof). Of the prewar chimes, there still exist two bells, after restitution to the congregation loaned by its presbytery exiled in Lübeck to other congregations in northern Germany. Osanna from 1632 can be found in St. Andrew's Church, Hildesheim, and Dominicalis from 1719 can be found under the name Osanna in St. Mary's Church, Lübeck, both in Germany. Dominicalis is used by the congregation of Lutheran St. Mary's Church, and the parament treasure is on public display.

=== Post-war Poland (1945–present) ===
Gdańsk was gradually repopulated by more Poles, and Polish authorities handed over St. Mary's Church to the Catholic diocese. Most of the artworks from the interior survived, having been evacuated for safekeeping to villages near the city. Many of these have returned to the church, but some are displayed in various museums around Poland. The diocese has sought to secure their return.

The reconstruction started shortly after the war in 1946. The roof was rebuilt in August 1947, using reinforced concrete. After the basic reconstruction was finished, the church was reconsecrated on November 17, 1955. The reconstruction and renovation of the interior is an ongoing effort.

On November 20, 1965, by papal bull, Pope Paul VI elevated the church to the dignity of the basilica. On February 2, the Congregation for Bishops established the Bazylika Mariacka as the Gdańsk Co-Cathedral in the then still non-metropolitan Catholic Diocese of Gdańsk. Since 1925 the Oliwa Cathedral is the cathedral of the diocese (elevated to archdiocese in 1992).

The funeral of Paweł Adamowicz, the assassinated Mayor of Gdańsk, took place at the basilica on 19 January 2019.

In 2020, the 15th-century Gothic Pietas Domini altar, which was stolen by Germany during World War II, was restored to the church from Berlin.

== Architecture ==
=== Exterior ===
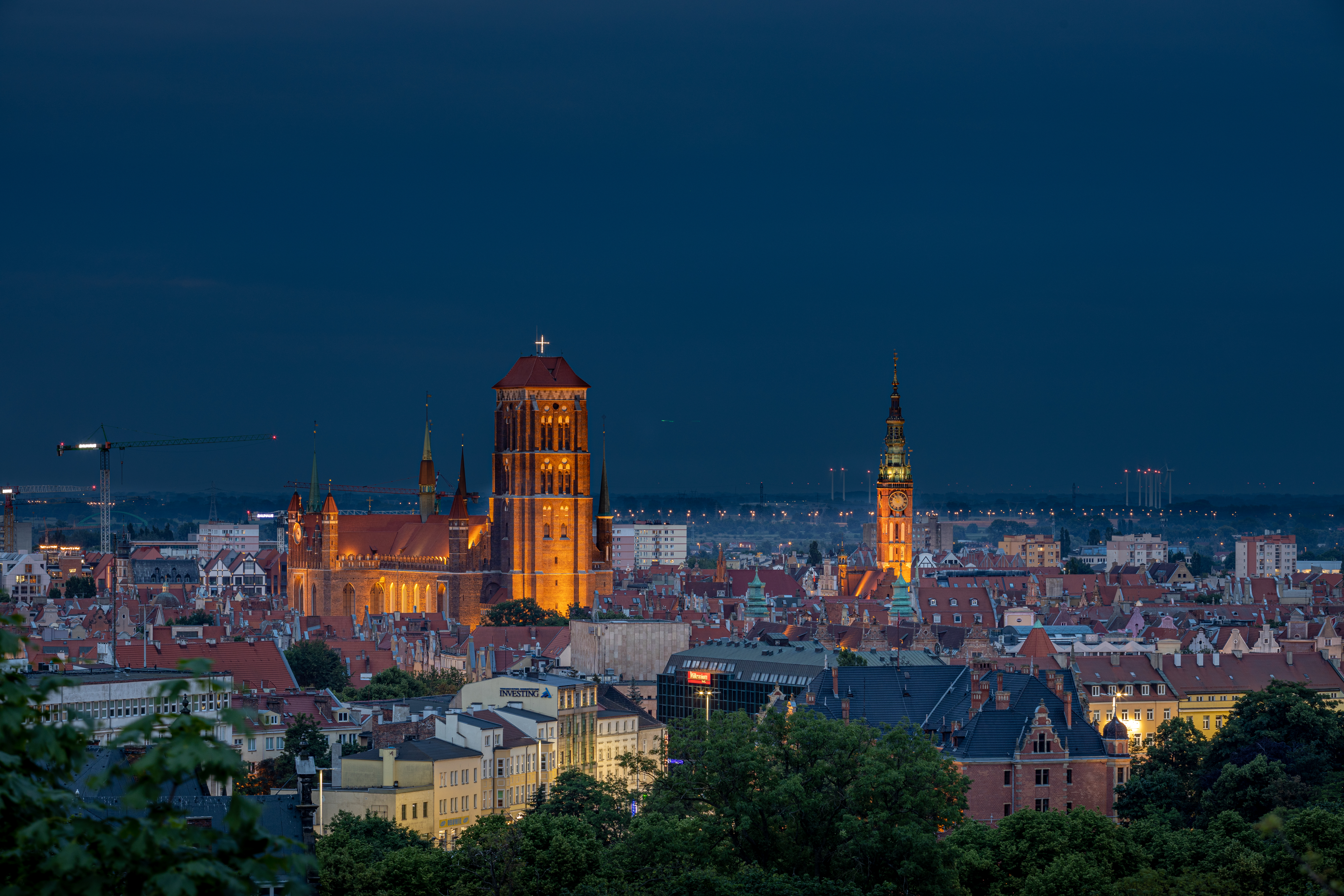
Panorama of Gdańsk, with St. Mary's Church dominating the Old Town's skyline due to its size.

St. Mary's Church is a triple-aisled hall church with a triple-aisled transept. Both the transept and the main nave are of similar width and height. Certain irregularities in the form of the northern arm of the transept are remnants of the previous church situated on the same site. In all, the building is a good example of late Gothic architecture.

The vaulting is a true piece of art. Much of it was restored after World War II. Main nave, transept and presbytery are covered by net vaults, while the aisles are covered by diamond vaults. The exterior of the nave is dominated by plain brick walls and high and narrow pointed arch windows. Such a construction was possible by placing corbels and buttresses inside of the church and erecting chapels between them. Similar constructions have been used in Albi Cathedral (1287–1487, Southern France) and Munich Frauenkirche (1468–1494). The gables are divided by a set of brick pinnacles. All corners are accentuated by turrets crowned by metal headpieces (reconstructed after 1970). Similar turrets can be found on the town hall of Lübeck as well as on the two large Churches of Leiden and on the Ridderzaal in The Hague.

The church is stabilized by strong buttresses and has seven portals – one in the west under the steeple, one in the eastern façade of the choir, two on the northern and three on the southern side. Six of the portals (all except the western) are of sandstone masonry.

=== Interior ===
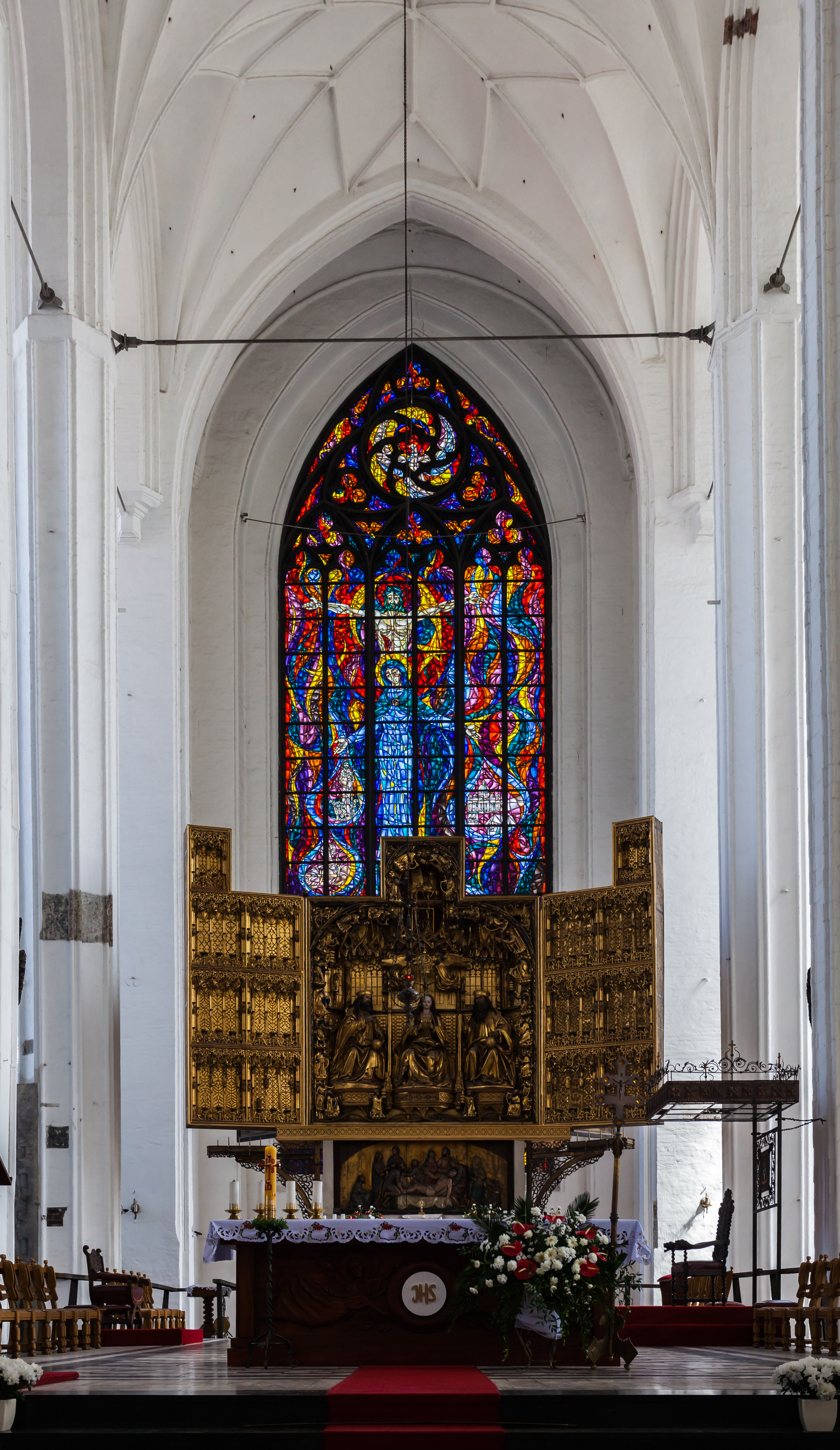
Main altar, from the northern aisle

The church is decorated within with several masterpieces of Gothic, Renaissance and Baroque painting. The most notable, The Last Judgement by Flemish painter Hans Memling, is currently preserved in the National Museum of Gdańsk. Other works of art were transferred to the National Museum in Warsaw in 1945. It was not until the 1990s when several of them were returned to the church. The most notable parts of internal decoration are:

- Jerusalem Altar, 1495–1500 (currently in the National Museum in Warsaw)
- High Altar, 1511–1517, Michael of Augsburg
- Ten Commandments, approx. 1485
- Gravestone of Simon and Judith Bahr, 1614–1620, Abraham van den Blocke
- Pietà, approx. 1420
- Holy Mother of God sculpture, approx. 1420
- Gdańsk astronomical clock, 1464–1470, Hans Düringer of Nuremberg, reconstructed after 1945
- Organ set, partially transferred from St. John's church in 1985.

== Bells ==
There are two bells in St Mary's Church. Both of them were cast in 1970 by foundry Felczyński in Przemyśl. The larger one is called Gratia Dei, weighs 7,850 kilograms (17,310 lb), and sounds in nominal F sharp. The smaller bell is the so-called Ave Maria, weighs 2,600 kilograms (5,700 lb), and sounds in C sharp.

== See also ==
- Polish Gothic
- History of Gdańsk
- List of Gothic brick buildings
- List of tallest structures built before the 20th century
