= William George Constable =

American art historian (1887–1976)

William George Constable (27 October 1887 – 3 February 1976) was an art historian and gallery director. He was the father of medievalist Giles Constable.

== Education ==
W. G. Constable was born in Derby. Distantly related to the landscape painter John Constable, he was educated at Derby School, where his father was headmaster, and at St John's College, Cambridge, where he read history, law and economics. In 1909, he was awarded the Whewell Scholarship for International Law. After gaining a First in economics in 1910, he was awarded the McMahon Law Studentship by St John's for four years, then entered the Inner Temple and was called to the Bar in May, 1914.

== War Service ==
During the First World War, Constable served in the Sherwood Foresters for two years, but he suffered severe shell shock when a shell exploded in a trench a few feet from him, burying him alive. He then spent a long period in a nursing home while recovering.

== Fellow of St John's College, Cambridge ==
While convalescing, Constable reworked and resubmitted an existing thesis to St John's and was elected a Fellow of the college, a position he held from January 1919 to the end of 1921.

== Art career ==
From 1921, Constable attended the Slade School of Art in London, worked at the Wallace Collection. In 1923, he joined the National Gallery, where he stayed for eight years, the last two as assistant director, and became an art critic for the New Statesman and the Saturday Review. In 1931, he moved to the newly formed Courtauld Institute of Art at the University of London, having been recruited as its first Director by Arthur Lee, 1st Viscount Lee of Fareham. In 1935, he succeeded Roger Fry as Slade Professor of Fine Art at the University of Cambridge, while continuing as Director of the Courtauld. In 1937, he resigned both positions and in 1938 left England to become Curator of the Boston Museum of Fine Arts. He remained in the United States until his death in Cambridge, Massachusetts, 1976.

== Papers of W. G. Constable ==
The papers of Constable are held in multiple repositories. The Smithsonian Archives of American Art holds biographical material as well as personal and professional correspondence and research papers belonging to Constable. Its collection also includes an oral history of Constable conducted in July 1972 - June 1973 by Robert Brown. Some material kept and created by Constable is also held at St John's College library. The Paul Mellon Centre archive holds the research notes, correspondence and photographs of Constable mainly relating to his work on the artist Richard Wilson, as well as other seventeenth-and-eighteenth-century artists.

== Marriage ==
Constable married Olivia Roberts in 1926. They had two children: John David Constable, a plastic surgeon at Harvard, and Giles Constable, a medieval historian whose major interest and focus concerned the abbey of Cluny and its abbot Peter the Venerable, especially his letters, which he edited.

== Selected publications ==
- John Flaxman 1755-1826 (University of London Press, 1927)
- Art History and Connoisseurship (1938)
- The Painter's Workshop (Oxford University Press, 1954)
- Richard Wilson (Routledge & Paul, London, 1953)
- Art Collecting in the United States of America: an Outline of a History (Nelson, London, 1964)
- Canaletto: Giovanni Antonio Canal, 1697-1768 (2 vols., Clarendon Press, Oxford, 1962)

== Bibliography ==
- W. G. Constable by J.G. Links in Burlington Magazine no. 118 (May 1976)
- Terisio Pignatti in Arte Veneta 30 (1976) 277–278
- Dictionary of National Biography, 1971-1980, pp. 171–2
- Art and Economics in Cambridge
- William George Constable at arthistorians.info

Academic offices
New title	Director of the Courtauld Institute of Art; 1932 to 1936	Succeeded by T. S. R. Boase
