= Elżbieta Temple =

Polish scholar

Academic work
- Discipline: Medieval Studies, Anglo-Saxon Manuscripts
- Notable works: Anglo-Saxon Manuscripts, 900-1066 (1976), Illuminated Manuscripts in the Oxford College Libraries, the University Archives and the Taylor Institution, (with J. J. G. Alexander, 1985)

Elżbieta Temple (July 8, 1909 – February 5, 1988), properly Elżbieta Klewin née Malcz, was a scholar and writer specialising in the field of illuminated manuscripts who produced two books, the second co-authored with J. J. G. Alexander.

== Her life and education ==
Temple was born in Olszowa, Poland in 1909. Her father Boleslaw Malcz (1873 - 1927) was a landowner and social activist. Her mother was Zofia née Moszyńska (1884 - 1964). She had two brothers Stanisław and Zbigniew.

In 1927 Elzbieta finished her secondary education at a school run by the Sisters of the Immaculate Conception in Nowy Sącz. She was admitted to the College of Fine Art in Cracow yet she had to quit for health reasons. In 1928/29 she took a course at the School of Painting and Drawing in Warsaw. In the period of 1929-37 she studied at the Academy of Fine Arts in Warsaw. In 1930 she married Jan Klewin, later a Warsaw architect. Around 1935 she created a large sgraffito at the residential building, Madalińskiego St. 80 in Warsaw, where she and her husband lived at that time. Today, under the freshly renovated work, a plaque recognizes the work of Elżbieta Malcz-Klewin. In the first days of World War II, Temple and her mother fled to England via Sweden.

In England in 1966 she received her B.A. degree from the Courtauld Institute of Art in London and in 1972 a Ph.D. degree from the University of London under the supervision of Christopher Hohler. Later on she moved to Eynsham and worked for over 20 years in the Duke Humfrey’s Library of the University of Oxford.

Her life partner in England was Dick Temple. She survived his death in a car accident and died on Feb. 5, 1988. She and her mother rest in one grave in the cemetery of St. Peter's Catholic Church in Eynsham.

== Her legacy ==
Temple’s book, Anglo-Saxon Manuscripts, 900-1066, Volume 2 of the 6 part series ‘Survey of Manuscripts Illuminated in the British Isles’ was lauded when it was first published. Nicolas Barker in The Book Collector, (Summer 1979) said of it, and the first volume in the series written by J. J. G. Alexander, Insular Manuscripts 6th to the 9th century, "The admirably comprehensive and thoughtfully arranged plates combine with the text to provide the best survey of this great period of British art yet produced" whilst John Beckwith in his review of her book in Apollo magazine, (vol. 104, 1976, p. 515), says "Mrs Temple’s scholarship is exemplary and her book will become a standard source of reference…".

It continues to be used as a reference book and cited extensively, for example, in Anglo-Saxon Manuscripts and their Heritage, p. 2, Gernot R. Weiland, University of British Columbia, when examining what is known about Anglo-Saxon illustrated manuscripts generally, states "Temple’s catalogue of illustrated Anglo-Saxon manuscripts between 900 and 1066 is the best place to start. Of the more than 100 manuscripts listed by her, several can be considered teaching texts."

Her other book, Illuminated Manuscripts in the Oxford College Libraries, with J. J. G. Alexander, is also considered influential and is said to be the inspiration for the cataloguing of the manuscripts in the University of Cambridge colleges and Fitzwilliam Museum collections which resulted in the publication of the first of a series of books, Illuminated Manuscripts in Cambridge.

== Websites ==
The British Library, in the article ‘Medieval England and France, 700-1200’ on their website, lists Temple’s book as recommended reading on English Manuscript Illumination, and her work forms the basis for the section ‘Illuminated Anglo-Saxon Manuscripts 900-1066 AD’ on the site ‘The Viking Age Compendium’.

== Other ==
As well as her contribution to the history of illuminated manuscripts, Elzbieta Temple also contributed photographs to the Conway Library that are currently being digitised by the Courtauld Institute of Art, as part of the Courtauld Connects project.

== Publications ==
- Anglo-Saxon Manuscripts, 900-1066, London : Harvey Miller, 1976, ISBN 0856020168
- Illuminated Manuscripts in the Oxford College Libraries, the University Archives and the Taylor Institution, (with J.J.G. Alexander), Oxford : Clarendon, 1985, ISBN 0198173814
