= Hans Düringer =

German clockmaker

Hans Düringer was a clockmaker from Nuremberg in Germany who died 1477 in Rostock. His most famous works are

- the Gdańsk Astronomical Clock in St. Mary's Church, Gdańsk 1470
- the Rostock Astronomical Clock in St. Mary's Church, Rostock 1472 which belongs to the so-called "Baltic clock family ".

According to the tradition, after Düringer made the clock of Gdańsk, the authorities had him blinded so that he couldn't build another such wonder. On a final inspection he destroyed the clock and escaped with the help of his daughter. After a long journey Düringer came to Rostock where he was welcomed with open arms. The authorities of Rostock offered him a deal: he could stay in Rostock for free for the rest of his life when he was willing to build a new astronomical clock in St. Mary's. Under his supervision, the new clock was built. In 1477 he died and was buried in Danzig.
