= Rostock astronomical clock =

Coordinates: 54.0895°N 12.1386°E

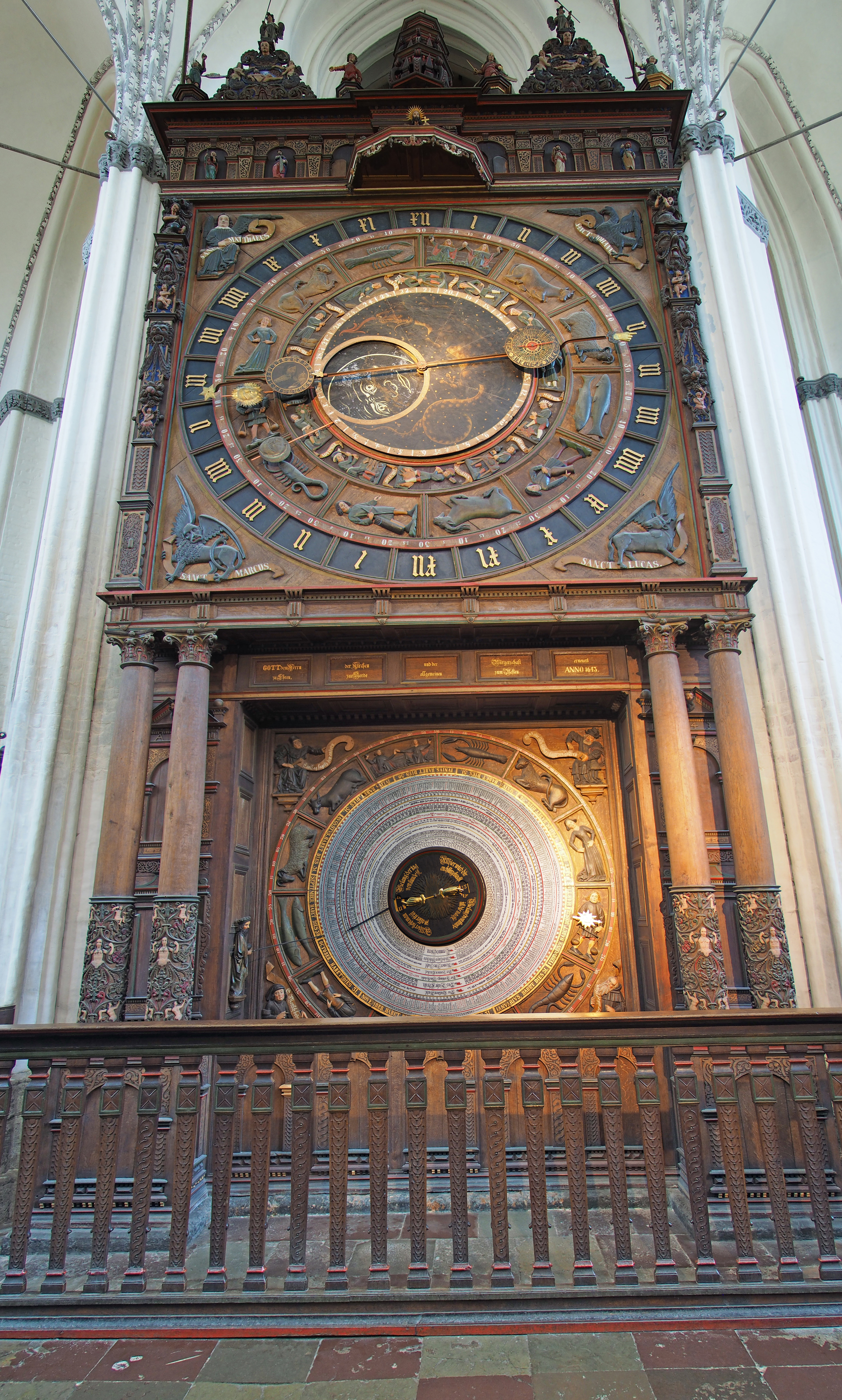
Rostock Astronomical Clock

The Rostock astronomical clock is a fifteenth-century astronomical clock in St. Mary's Church, Rostock.

== History and Description ==
The astronomical clock was built in 1472 by Hans Düringer, a clockmaker from Nuremberg. It consists of three partitions:

- Top: Apostle-go-round giving an hourly performance of the apostles crossing before Jesus for a blessing before entry into eternal bliss, and the last, Judas, is shut out.
- Middle: Clock with daily time, zodiac, moon phases, and month.
- Bottom: Calendar, which is valid until 2150 (with the beginning of 2018, this table replaced the 4th, which lasted from 1885 to 2017).

The medieval clock is the only one of its kind still in working condition with its original clockworks.
