= Gdańsk astronomical clock =

15th-century astronomical clock in Poland

Coordinates: 54°21′00″N 18°39′12″E

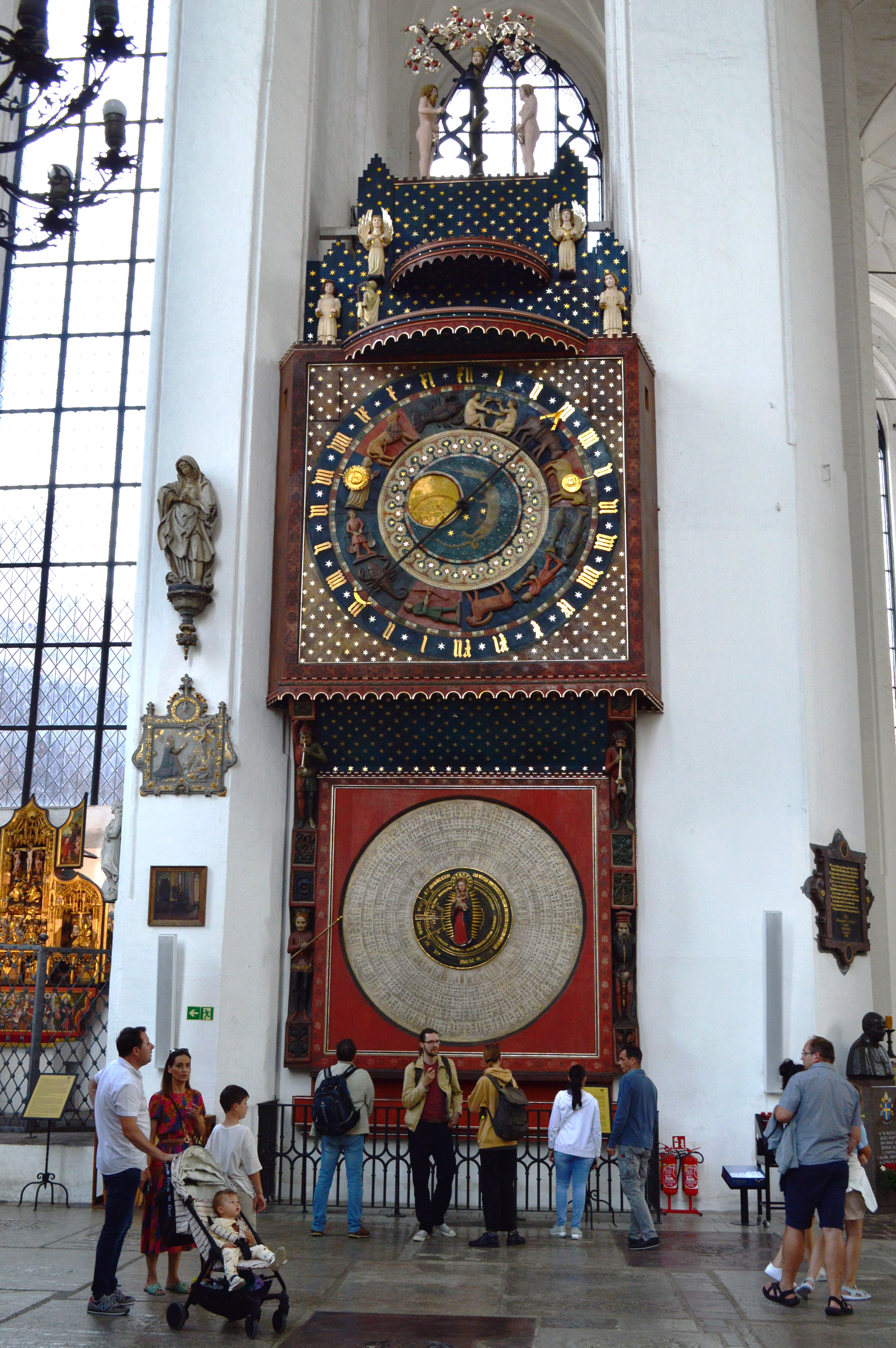
The clock in 2023

The Gdańsk astronomical clock is a fifteenth-century astronomical clock in St. Mary's Church, Gdańsk, Poland, restored in 1990. It was the largest such clock in the world at the time of completion.

== Description ==
The clock's dials show the time and date, phase of the Moon, the position of the Moon and Sun in relation to zodiac signs, and a calendar of saints. Adam and Eve ring the bell on the hour, and at noon, a procession appears that features Adam and Eve alongside the Three Kings, the Apostles, and Death.

== History ==
The clock was constructed between 1464–1470 by Hans Düringer. Standing at 14 metres (46 ft) tall, upon completion, the clock was the largest in the world. Falling into disrepair in the 16th century, it stopped functioning in 1554. It was evacuated to the Vistula Fens during World War II. In 1983, local historian Andrzej Januszajtis appointed a committee with the goal of restoring the clock, which was reactivated on 9 May 1990. It was restored in 2018 to 2019.
