= Prus II Wilczekosy coat of arms =

Polish coat of arms

Prus II
- Battle cry: Moszczenica, Nagody, Na pole, Prus
- Alternative names: Wilczekosy, Wilcze Kosy, Słubica, Falcastrum Lupinum
- Earliest mention: 12th century
- Families: Bandkowski, Bawor, Baworowski, Będkowski, Bielejowski, Bielowski, Blichowski, Białyszewski, Chłopicki, Chmętowski, Damecki, Danielecki, Daniecki, Dawidowski, Dębowski, Dowejko, Faszcz, Faszczewski, Filonienko, Gąsowski, Glauch, Glinojecki, Glinowiecki, Gloger, Glogier, Głaznecki, Głaznocki, Głuchowski, Głuchowski-Gleich, Gołąb, Gościszewski, Grabowski, Grochowalski, Grodzieński, Grzybowski, Grzybiński, Jezierski, Jeżewski, Kalnochwotski, Kamocki, Kanafocki, Kanafojski, Kamiski, Katlewski, Klukowski, Kobyliński, Kosiński, Kostecki, Łaźniewski, Łanźiowski, Lisicki, Lubecki, Łubecki, Lubiatowski, Makowski, Małachowski, Miszewski, Miszkiel, Mitarnowski, Myślecki, Myślęcki, Moszczyński, Nakwaski, Niewierski, Obrębski, Olszewski, Olszowski, Osowiński, Ossowiński, Orpinowski, Orpiński, Orzeszkowski, Petrellewicz, Płomiański, Preczkowski, Pręczkowski, Pruski, Radomiński, Rogusławski, Rosołowski, Rudowski, Samicki, Segnic, Siodłowski, Skotnicki, Strzemieczny, Stypiński, Szczyciński, Świętochowski, Tobaczyński, Wieczwiński, Windacki, Windak, Windyka, Wodziński, Wołowski, Wytrychowski, Wytrykus, Wspinek (Spinek), Zaborowski (Saborowski, Zaborowskij, Zabriskie,) Zabrodski, Zacharski, Zglenicki, Zglinicki, Żyrowski

Prus II Wilczekosy is a Polish coat of arms. It was used by several szlachta families in the times of the Polish–Lithuanian Commonwealth.

== Blazon ==
Gule, two wolf scythes Argent, crossed at tips, tied below with a tie Or so its one end hangs. Where scythes cross a one and half cross Argent is raised, whose lower arm points to the left. On the helmet an armed hand bent in elbow holds a left-inclined sword.

== Notable bearers ==
Notable bearers of this coat of arms include:

- Walerian Olszowski (*1587–†1650), first senator of the Olszowski h. Prus II family - His father was Marcin O. and his grandfather was Piotr O.
- Andrzej Olszowski (*1623-†1677), son of Walerian, Archbishop of Gniezno and Primate of Poland who crowned Jan III Sobieski 1676
