= Andrzej Olszowski =

Polish bishop (1621–1677)

His Excellency Andrzej Olszowski
- Archbishop of Gniezno; Primate of Poland
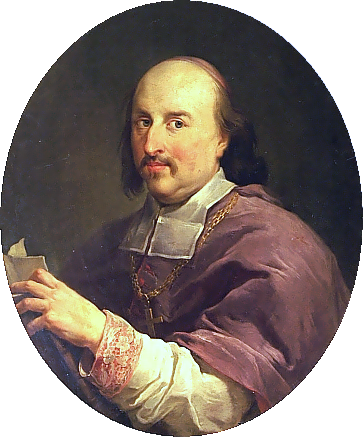
- Church: Roman Catholic
- Archdiocese: Gniezno
- Installed: 1674
- Term ended: 1677

Orders
- Consecration: 8 August 1661

Personal details
- Born: 27 January 1621 Olszowa
- Died: 29 August 1677 (aged 56) Gdańsk
- Coat of arms

Andrzej Olszowski (27 January 1621 – 29 August 1677) was a Polish political speaker and writer. He was bishop of Chełmno from 1661 until 1674, and was archbishop of Gniezno and the primate of Poland from 1674.

Olszowski was born in Olszowa. He was provost of the Poznań cathedral chapter (1657–1667) and a Crown Deputy Chancellors in 1666–1676. He died in Gdańsk.

== More important works and speeches ==
1. Memoriale nomine Sacra Regiae Majestatis Poloniae et Sueciae ad ... S. R. Imp. Electores, principes et ordines, no place of publication, 1658; ed. next: no place of publication, 1658 (with Dutch translation); no place of issue 1659; (Dutch translation: Aenspraecke, ende over-gegeven Memoriael, van weghen Sijne Kon. Majt. van Poolen, Sweeden ... aen de doorluchtige Heeren Keur-Fursten des H. Roomschen Rijcx, 1658 - with Latin text)

2. Censura candidatorum skeptri Polonici (several editions), other ed. 1669 (several editions (digital copy available)); transl. French pt. Censure ou discours politique, touchant les prétendants à la couronne de Pologne, 1669, ed. next: (1669), Cologne 1670; transl. Dutch Censura, of oordeel over de Trachters naar de kroon van Polen, 1669

3. Polish speeches from 1649 to 1676 and others, ed.: J. S. Pisarski, Mowca polski, vol. 2, Kalisz 1676; J. Daneykowicz Ostrowski, Polish and Latin swada, vol. 1, Lublin 1745

4.Latin Speeches from 1665 to 1674 and others, ed. J. C. Luenig, Orationes procerum Europae, Vol. 2, Leipzig 1713; some speeches then came out separately; see Estreicher XXIII, 341-348
