= Stanisławów =

Stanisławów may refer to:

== Places ==
=== Central Poland ===
- Stanisławów, Greater Poland Voivodeship (central Poland)
- Stanisławów, Koło County, in Greater Poland Voivodeship (central Poland)
- Stanisławów, Gmina Kutno, in Łódź Voivodeship (central Poland)
- Stanisławów, Gmina Oporów, in Łódź Voivodeship (central Poland)
- Stanisławów, Łask County, in Łódź Voivodeship (central Poland)
- Stanisławów, Opoczno County, in Łódź Voivodeship (central Poland)
- Stanisławów, Pajęczno County, in Łódź Voivodeship (central Poland)
- Stanisławów, Gmina Łęki Szlacheckie, in Łódź Voivodeship (central Poland)
- Stanisławów, Gmina Wolbórz, in Łódź Voivodeship (central Poland)
- Stanisławów, Poddębice County, in Łódź Voivodeship (central Poland)
- Stanisławów, Rawa County, in Łódź Voivodeship (central Poland)
- Stanisławów, Sieradz County, in Łódź Voivodeship (central Poland)
- Stanisławów, Gmina Rzeczyca, Tomaszów County, in Łódź Voivodeship (central Poland)
- Stanisławów, Gmina Żelechlinek, in Łódź Voivodeship (central Poland)
- Stanisławów, Wieluń County, in Łódź Voivodeship (central Poland)
- Stanisławów Lipski, in Tomaszów County, Łódź Voivodeship (central Poland)
- Stanisławów Nowy, in Pabianice County, Łódź Voivodeship (central Poland)
- Stanisławów Stary, in Pabianice County, Łódź Voivodeship (central Poland)
- Stanisławów Studziński, in Tomaszów County, Łódź Voivodeship (central Poland)

=== Eastern Poland ===
- Stanisławów, Biłgoraj County, in Lublin Voivodeship (east Poland)
- Stanisławów, Chełm County, in Lublin Voivodeship (east Poland)
- Stanisławów, Gmina Opole Lubelskie in Opole County, Lublin Voivodeship, (east Poland)
- Stanisławów, Radzyń County, in Lublin Voivodeship (east Poland)
- Stanisławów, Włodawa County, in Lublin Voivodeship (east Poland)
- Stanisławów Duży, in Lubartów County, Lublin Voivodeship (east Poland)
- Stanisławów, Białobrzegi County, in Masovian Voivodeship (east-central Poland)
- Stanisławów, Gostynin County, in Masovian Voivodeship (east-central Poland)
- Stanisławów, Grodzisk County, in Masovian Voivodeship (east-central Poland)
- Stanisławów, Kozienice County, in Masovian Voivodeship (east-central Poland)
- Stanisławów, Mińsk County, in Masovian Voivodeship (east-central Poland)
- Stanisławów, Gmina Leoncin, Nowy Dwór County, in Masovian Voivodeship (east-central Poland)
- Stanisławów, Przysucha County, in Masovian Voivodeship (east-central Poland)
- Stanisławów, Radom County, in Masovian Voivodeship (east-central Poland)
- Stanisławów, Gmina Chlewiska, in Masovian Voivodeship (east-central Poland)
- Stanisławów, Warsaw West County, in Masovian Voivodeship (east-central Poland)
- Stanisławów, Wołomin County, in Masovian Voivodeship (east-central Poland)
- Stanisławów, Zwoleń County, in Masovian Voivodeship (east-central Poland)
- Gmina Stanisławów, in Mińsk County, Masovian Voivodeship (east-central Poland)
  - Mały Stanisławów
  - Kolonie Stanisławów
- Stanisławów Skrzański, in Gostynin County, Masovian Voivodeship (east-central Poland)

=== Southern Poland ===
- Stanisławów, Świętokrzyskie Voivodeship (south-central Poland)
- Stanisławów, Częstochowa County, in Silesian Voivodeship (south Poland)
- Stanisławów, Kłobuck County, in Silesian Voivodeship (south Poland)
- Stanisławów, Lower Silesian Voivodeship (south-west Poland)

=== Ukraine ===
- Ivano-Frankivsk, formerly Polish Stanisławów, city in Ukraine
- Stanisławów Voivodeship, formerly in Poland, now in Ukraine

== Other uses ==
- Rewera Stanisławów, a Polish football team
- Stanisławów District League

== See also ==
- Stanislav (disambiguation)
- Stanisławowo (disambiguation)
- Stanisławski
