= Konstancja =

Konstancja may refer to:

- Konstancja Benisławska (1747–1806), Polish poet and writer of religious hymns
- Konstancja Czartoryska (1700–1759) (1696–1759), Polish szlachta, known as the mother of king Stanisław August Poniatowski
- Konstancja Gładkowska (1810–1889), Polish soprano
- Konstancja Kochaniec (born 1976), Polish classical and film music composer
- Anna Katarzyna Konstancja (1619–1651), Polish princess, daughter of King Sigismund III Vasa and his second wife Constance of Austria
- Konstancja Lubomirska (1618–1646), Polish noble lady
- Konstancja Małgorzata Lubomirska (1761–1840), Polish noblewoman artist
- Konstancja Poniatowska (1759–1830), Polish noblewoman, niece of king Stanisław August Poniatowski
- Konstancja Potocka (1781–1852), Polish noblewoman, translator and illustrator
- Elżbieta Konstancja Potulicka (1859–1947), Polish noblewoman
- Konstancja Sanguszko (1716–1791), Polish magnate
- Gryzelda Konstancja Wiśniowiecka (1623–1672), Polish noblewoman, mother of King Michał Korybut Wiśniowiecki

== See also ==
- Wólka-Konstancja, a village in Gmina Stanisławów, Mińsk County, Masovian Voivodeship, in east-central Poland
- Konstan
- Kostana (disambiguation)
