= Paulinów =

Paulinów may refer to the following places:

- Paulinów, Łódź Voivodeship (central Poland)
- Paulinów, Lublin Voivodeship (east Poland)
- Paulinów, Masovian Voivodeship (east-central Poland)
- Paulinów, Greater Poland Voivodeship (west-central Poland)
- Paulinów, Silesian Voivodeship (south Poland)
