= Josima Feldschuh =

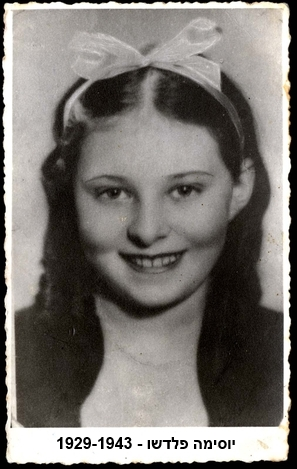

Background information
- Born: June 26, 1929; Warsaw, Poland
- Died: April 21, 1943 (aged 13) Pustelnik, Mińsk County, Poland
- Genres: Classical music

Josima Feldschuh (also spelled Feldszuh or Feldschu; 26 June 1929 – 21 April 1943) was a Polish pianist and composer of Jewish origin. Feldshuh was considered a child prodigy.

== Life ==
Josima Feldschuh was born in Warsaw in 1929 to Ruben Feldschuh and Perła (Pnina) née Richter. Her father was an intellectual and a Zionist, while her mother, who started teaching Josima to play the piano when the girl was 5 years old, was a pianist and a musicologist. The young pianist was considered a child prodigy. Her father's cousin Rokhl Auerbakh later described Josima as having perfect pitch and great musical memory which helped her play the works of Chopin, Mendelssohn or Bach from memory and offer her own interpretations.

In November 1940, the Feldschuh family had to move to the Warsaw Ghetto. It was there that her skill was publicly recognised for the first time, at a weekly musical soirée. Since the event, Josima gained new music teachers and started practicing for her debut concert, at which she was to perform the Piano Concerto No. 9 by Wolfgang Amadeus Mozart. The concert, which was advertised in the ghetto with posters featuring a pre-war photo of a smiling Josima, took place on March 15, 1941, when Josima was 11 years old. The young pianist was accompanied by the Jewish Symphony Orchestra which consisted of musicians who had before the war belonged to, among others, the ensemble of the National Philharmonic in Warsaw. After a standing ovation, Josima played two of her own pieces as encore.

Apart from playing the piano, Josima also composed her own music and wanted to become a composer. 17 pieces have survived the war, among them 6 mazurkas, “A little birdie says,” “Village musicians,” “Murmur of a stream,” as well as the “Eastern Suite” which was inspired by Shabbat songs and prayer chanting. The notebook containing her music is part of the Yad Vashem collection.

When the ghetto mass deportations to Treblinka extermination camp started, the Feldschuh family went into hiding. At that time Josima contracted pneumonia which had lasting effects on her health. In January 1943 the Feldschuhs escaped the ghetto with the help of Szoszana Kassower. Around that time Josima was diagnosed with terminal stage tuberculosis. She died on April 21 in the village of Pustelnik, where the Feldschuhs were hiding. Shortly afterwards, her mother committed suicide. After the war, Ruben Feldschuh moved their remains to a different location, most likely to the Jewish Cemetery in Warsaw.

The works of Josima Feldschuh continue to be played. Her works have been performed at the Wigmore Hall and Austrian Cultural Forum in London, in Plzeň, Leeds, York and at Longy School of Music of Bard College in Cambridge, MA, among others. Josima's music has been also showcased at the POLIN Museum of the History of Polish Jews, most notably during a concert of the winner of Paszport Polityki award, pianist Emilia Sitarz.

In 2019, the commemorations of the 76th anniversary of the outbreak of the Warsaw Ghetto Uprising included a concert which recreated Josima's performance with the Jewish Symphony Orchestra. The part of Josima was played by Lauren Zhang, who was accompanied by the Sinfonia Varsovia orchestra. In 2021, the POLIN Museum of the History of Polish Jews in collaboration with the New York Philharmonic planned to create an educational program for children which was to be named after Josima.
