= Stanisław Kur =

Polish priest (born 1929)

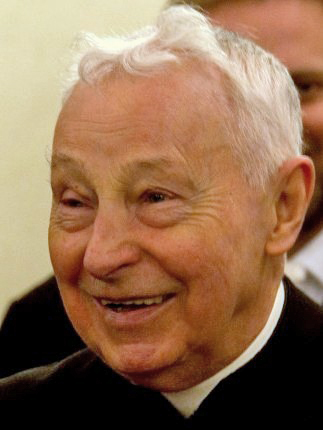
- Born: 13 November 1929 (age 96); Dzięcioły Bliższe
- Church: Roman Catholic
- Ordained: 1953
- Offices held: Episcopal Vicar of The Archdiocese of Warsaw
- Title: Protonotary apostolic

Stanisław Kur (born 13 November 1929, in Dzięcioły Bliższe) is a Polish biblical scholar and Roman Catholic priest.

== Biography ==
After studies at Metropolitan Higher Seminary in Warsaw ordained priest in 1953. He obtained a post-doctorate diploma (habilitation) in 1990 with a dissertation entitled Life of Marha Krestos. During the years 1982-1997 he was a rector of seminary in Warsaw.

He is retired extraordinary professor at Pontifical Faculty of Theology in Warsaw (PWTW). He was lecturing in biblical theology, Old Testament Exegesis and Biblical languages at the PWTW and the University of Cardinal Stefan Wyszynski.

At present, he is Episcopal Vicar of The Archdiocese of Warsaw and protonotary apostolic (from 1999).
