= Zagóry =

Zagóry may refer to:

- Zagóry, Lesser Poland Voivodeship (south Poland)
- Zagóry, Łódź Voivodeship (central Poland)
- Zagóry, Polish name for Žagarė, Lithuania
