= Retków =

Retków may refer to the following places in Poland:

- Retków, Lower Silesian Voivodeship (south-west Poland)
- Retków, Masovian Voivodeship (east-central Poland)
