= Sokole =

Sokole may refer to the following places:

- Sokole, Pomeranian Voivodeship (north Poland)
- Sokole, Człuchów County in Pomeranian Voivodeship
- Sokole, Podlaskie Voivodeship (north-east Poland)
- Sokóle, Podlaskie Voivodeship (north-east Poland)
- Sokóle, Masovian Voivodeship (east-central Poland)
