= Krzemienica =

Krzemienica may refer to the following places:

- Krzemienica, Łódź Voivodeship (central Poland)
- Krzemienica, Łańcut County in Subcarpathian Voivodeship (south-east Poland)
- Krzemienica, Mielec County in Subcarpathian Voivodeship (south-east Poland)
- Krzemienica, Pomeranian Voivodeship (north Poland)
