= Annów =

Annów may refer to the following places:

- Annów, Poddębice County in Łódź Voivodeship (central Poland)
- Annów, Gmina Czerniewice, Tomaszów County in Łódź Voivodeship (central Poland)
- Annów, Lublin Voivodeship (east Poland)
- Annów, Masovian Voivodeship (east-central Poland)
