= Ciopan =

- Village
- Location within Poland
- Coordinates: 52°16′52″N 21°29′17″E
- Country: Poland
- Voivodeship: Masovian
- County: Mińsk
- Gmina: Stanisławów
- Population: 165

Ciopan [ˈt͡ɕɔpan] is a village in the administrative district of Gmina Stanisławów, within Mińsk County, Masovian Voivodeship, in east-central Poland.
