= Gmina Czerniewice =

Gmina Czerniewice Czerniewice Commune
- Gmina

- Coat of arms
- Interactive map of Gmina Czerniewice
- Coordinates (Czerniewice): 51°39′27″N 20°9′27″E
- Country: Poland
- Voivodeship: Łódź
- County: Tomaszów
- Seat: Czerniewice

Area
  - Total: 127.73 km^{2} (49.32 sq mi)

Population (2006)
  - Total: 5,113
  - Density: 40.03/km^{2} (103.7/sq mi)
- Time zone: UTC+1 (CET)
  - Summer (DST): UTC+2 (CEST)
- Website: czerniewice.pl

Gmina Czerniewice is a rural gmina (administrative district) in Tomaszów County, Łódź Voivodeship, in central Poland. Its seat is the village of Czerniewice, which lies approximately 19 kilometres (12 mi) north-east of Tomaszów Mazowiecki and 50 km (31 mi) east of the regional capital Łódź.

The gmina covers an area of 127.73 square kilometres (49.3 sq mi), and as of 2006, its total population was 5,113.

The gmina contains part of the protected area called Spała Landscape Park.

== Villages ==
Gmina Czerniewice contains the villages and settlements of:

- Annopol Duży
- Annopol Mały
- Annów
- Chociw
- Chociwek
- Czerniewice
- Dąbrówka
- Dzielnica
- Gaj
- Helenów
- Józefów
- Krzemienica
- Lechów
- Lipie
- Mała Wola
- Nowa Strzemeszna
- Nowe Studzianki
- Paulinów
- Podkonice Duże
- Podkonice Małe
- Podkonice Miejskie
- Podkońska Wola
- Stanisławów Lipski
- Stanisławów Studziński
- Strzemeszna
- Strzemeszna Pierwsza
- Studzianki
- Teodozjów
- Turobów
- Wale
- Wielka Wola
- Wólka Jagielczyńska
- Zagóry
- Zubki Duże
- Zubki Małe

== Neighbouring gminas ==
Gmina Czerniewice is bordered by the gminas of Cielądz, Inowłódz, Lubochnia, Rawa Mazowiecka, Rzeczyca and Żelechlinek.
