= Józefów, Gmina Czerniewice =

Józefów
- Village
- Location within Poland
- Coordinates: 51°39′21″N 20°10′35″E
- Country: Poland
- Voivodeship: Łódź
- County: Tomaszów
- Gmina: Czerniewice

Józefów (Polish pronunciation: [juˈzɛfuf]) is a village in the administrative district of Gmina Czerniewice, within Tomaszów County, Łódź Voivodeship, in central Poland.
