= Wale, Poland =

Wale
- Village
- Location within Poland
- Coordinates: 51°42′N 20°16′E
- Country: Poland
- Voivodeship: Łódź
- County: Tomaszów
- Gmina: Czerniewice

Wale [ˈvalɛ] is a village in the administrative district of Gmina Czerniewice, within Tomaszów County, Łódź Voivodeship, in central Poland.
