= Ołdakowizna =

- Village
- Location within Poland
- Coordinates: 52°19′19″N 21°32′08″E
- Country: Poland
- Voivodeship: Masovian
- County: Mińsk
- Gmina: Stanisławów
- Population: 102

Ołdakowizna [ɔu̯dakɔˈvizna] is a village in the administrative district of Gmina Stanisławów, within Mińsk County, Masovian Voivodeship, in east-central Poland.
