= Dzięcioły-Kolonia =

- Village
- Location within Poland
- Coordinates: 52°35′58″N 22°16′48″E
- Country: Poland
- Voivodeship: Masovian
- County: Sokołów
- Gmina: Sterdyń

Dzięcioły-Kolonia [d͡ʑɛnˈt͡ɕɔwɨ kɔˈlɔɲa] is a village in the administrative district of Gmina Sterdyń, within Sokołów County, Masovian Voivodeship, in eastern Poland.
