= Turobów =

- Village
- Location within Poland
- Coordinates: 51°41′N 20°10′E
- Country: Poland
- Voivodeship: Łódź
- County: Tomaszów
- Gmina: Czerniewice

Turobów [tuˈrɔbuf] is a village in the administrative district of Gmina Czerniewice, within Tomaszów County, Łódź Voivodeship, in central Poland.
