= Lipie, Gmina Czerniewice =

Lipie
- Village
- Location within Poland
- Coordinates: 51°30′14″N 20°12′1″E
- Country: Poland
- Voivodeship: Łódź
- County: Tomaszów
- Gmina: Czerniewice
- Population (approx.): 200

Lipie [ˈlipjɛ] is a village in the administrative district of Gmina Czerniewice, within Tomaszów County, Łódź Voivodeship, in central Poland.

The village has an approximate population of 200.
