= Golanki, Masovian Voivodeship =

Golanki
- Village
- Location within Poland
- Coordinates: 52°34′44″N 22°16′23″E
- Country: Poland
- Voivodeship: Masovian
- County: Sokołów
- Gmina: Sterdyń

Golanki [ɡɔˈlanki] is a village in the administrative district of Gmina Sterdyń, within Sokołów County, Masovian Voivodeship, in east-central Poland.
