= Nowy Ratyniec =

- Village
- Location within Poland
- Coordinates: 52°32′25″N 22°13′48″E
- Country: Poland
- Voivodeship: Masovian
- County: Sokołów
- Gmina: Sterdyń

Nowy Ratyniec [ˈnɔvɨ raˈtɨɲɛt͡s] is a village in the administrative district of Gmina Sterdyń, within Sokołów County, Masovian Voivodeship, in east-central Poland.
