= Zaleś, Sokołów County =

Zaleś
- Village
- Location within Poland
- Coordinates: 52°33′24″N 22°13′58″E
- Country: Poland
- Voivodeship: Masovian
- County: Sokołów
- Gmina: Sterdyń

Zaleś [ˈzalɛɕ] is a village in the administrative district of Gmina Sterdyń, within Sokołów County, Masovian Voivodeship, in east-central Poland.
