= Kiełpiniec =

- Village
- Location within Poland
- Coordinates: 52°37′N 22°21′E
- Country: Poland
- Voivodeship: Masovian
- County: Sokołów
- Gmina: Sterdyń
- Population: 290

Kiełpiniec [kʲɛu̯ˈpiɲɛt͡s] is a village in the administrative district of Gmina Sterdyń, within Sokołów County, Masovian Voivodeship, in east-central Poland.
