= Studzianki, Gmina Czerniewice =

Studzianki
- Village
- Location within Poland
- Coordinates: 51°39′57″N 20°7′36″E
- Country: Poland
- Voivodeship: Łódź
- County: Tomaszów
- Gmina: Czerniewice

Studzianki [stuˈd͡ʑaŋki] is a village in the administrative district of Gmina Czerniewice, within Tomaszów County, Łódź Voivodeship, in central Poland.
