= Annopol Mały =

- Village
- Location within Poland
- Coordinates: 51°40′28″N 20°6′46″E
- Country: Poland
- Voivodeship: Łódź
- County: Tomaszów
- Gmina: Czerniewice

Annopol Mały [anˈnɔpɔl ˈmawɨ] is a village in the administrative district of Gmina Czerniewice, within Tomaszów County, Łódź Voivodeship, in central Poland.
