= Wólka Piecząca =

- Village
- Location within Poland
- Coordinates: 52°19′6″N 21°34′33″E
- Country: Poland
- Voivodeship: Masovian
- County: Mińsk
- Gmina: Stanisławów
- Population: 128

Wólka Piecząca [ˈvulka pjɛˈt͡ʂɔnt͡sa] is a village in the administrative district of Gmina Stanisławów, within Mińsk County, Masovian Voivodeship, in east-central Poland.
