= Prądzewo =

Village in Gmina Stanisławów, Poland

- Village
- Location within Poland
- Coordinates: 52°17′43″N 21°31′55″E
- Country: Poland
- Voivodeship: Masovian
- County: Mińsk
- Gmina: Stanisławów
- Population: 100

Prądzewo [prɔnˈd͡zɛvɔ] is a village in the administrative district of Gmina Stanisławów, within Mińsk County, Masovian Voivodeship, in east-central Poland.
