= Lebiedzie-Kolonia =

- Village
- Location within Poland
- Coordinates: 52°35′32″N 22°15′58″E
- Country: Poland
- Voivodeship: Masovian
- County: Sokołów
- Gmina: Sterdyń
- Population: 91

Lebiedzie-Kolonia [lɛˈbjɛd͡ʑɛ kɔˈlɔɲa] is a village in the administrative district of Gmina Sterdyń, within Sokołów County, Masovian Voivodeship, in east-central Poland.
