= Annopol Duży =

- Village
- Location within Poland
- Coordinates: 51°39′58″N 20°6′16″E
- Country: Poland
- Voivodeship: Łódź
- County: Tomaszów
- Gmina: Czerniewice

Annopol Duży [anˈnɔpɔl ˈduʐɨ] is a village in the administrative district of Gmina Czerniewice, within Tomaszów County, Łódź Voivodeship, in central Poland.
