= Ładzyń =

- Village
- Location within Poland
- Coordinates: 52°15′N 21°33′E
- Country: Poland
- Voivodeship: Masovian
- County: Mińsk
- Gmina: Stanisławów
- Population: 357

Ładzyń [ˈwad͡zɨɲ] is a village in the administrative district of Gmina Stanisławów, within Mińsk County, Masovian Voivodeship in east-central Poland.
