= Kamieńczyk, Sokołów County =

Kamieńczyk
- Village
- Location within Poland
- Coordinates: 52°35′23″N 22°25′37″E
- Country: Poland
- Voivodeship: Masovian
- County: Sokołów
- Gmina: Sterdyń

Kamieńczyk (Polish pronunciation: [kaˈmjɛj̃tʂɨk]) is a village in the administrative district of Gmina Sterdyń, within Sokołów County, Masovian Voivodeship, in east-central Poland.
