= Porąb =

- Village
- Location within Poland
- Coordinates: 52°15′57″N 21°36′05″E
- Country: Poland
- Voivodeship: Masovian
- County: Mińsk
- Gmina: Stanisławów

Porąb [ˈpɔrɔmp] is a village in the administrative district of Gmina Stanisławów, within Mińsk County, Masovian Voivodeship, in east-central Poland.
