= Dzielnica, Gmina Czerniewice =

Dzielnica
- Village
- Location within Poland
- Coordinates: 51°37′53″N 20°14′29″E
- Country: Poland
- Voivodeship: Łódź
- County: Tomaszów
- Gmina: Czerniewice

Dzielnica [d͡ʑɛlˈnit͡sa] is a village in the administrative district of Gmina Czerniewice, within Tomaszów County, Łódź Voivodeship, in central Poland.
