= Stary Ratyniec =

- Village
- Location within Poland
- Coordinates: 52°33′23″N 22°14′24″E
- Country: Poland
- Voivodeship: Masovian
- County: Sokołów
- Gmina: Sterdyń

Stary Ratyniec [ˈstarɨ raˈtɨɲɛt͡s] is a village in the administrative district of Gmina Sterdyń, within Sokołów County, Masovian Voivodeship, in east-central Poland.
