= Gaj, Gmina Czerniewice =

Gaj
- Village
- Location within Poland
- Coordinates: 51°37′14″N 20°12′18″E
- Country: Poland
- Voivodeship: Łódź
- County: Tomaszów
- Gmina: Czerniewice

Gaj [ɡai̯] is a village in the administrative district of Gmina Czerniewice, within Tomaszów County, Łódź Voivodeship, in central Poland.
