= Stare Mursy =

- Village
- Location within Poland
- Coordinates: 52°33′47″N 22°15′01″E
- Country: Poland
- Voivodeship: Masovian
- County: Sokołów
- Gmina: Sterdyń

Stare Mursy [ˈstarɛ ˈmursɨ] is a village in the administrative district of Gmina Sterdyń, within Sokołów County, Masovian Voivodeship, in east-central Poland.
