= Sterdyń =

- Village
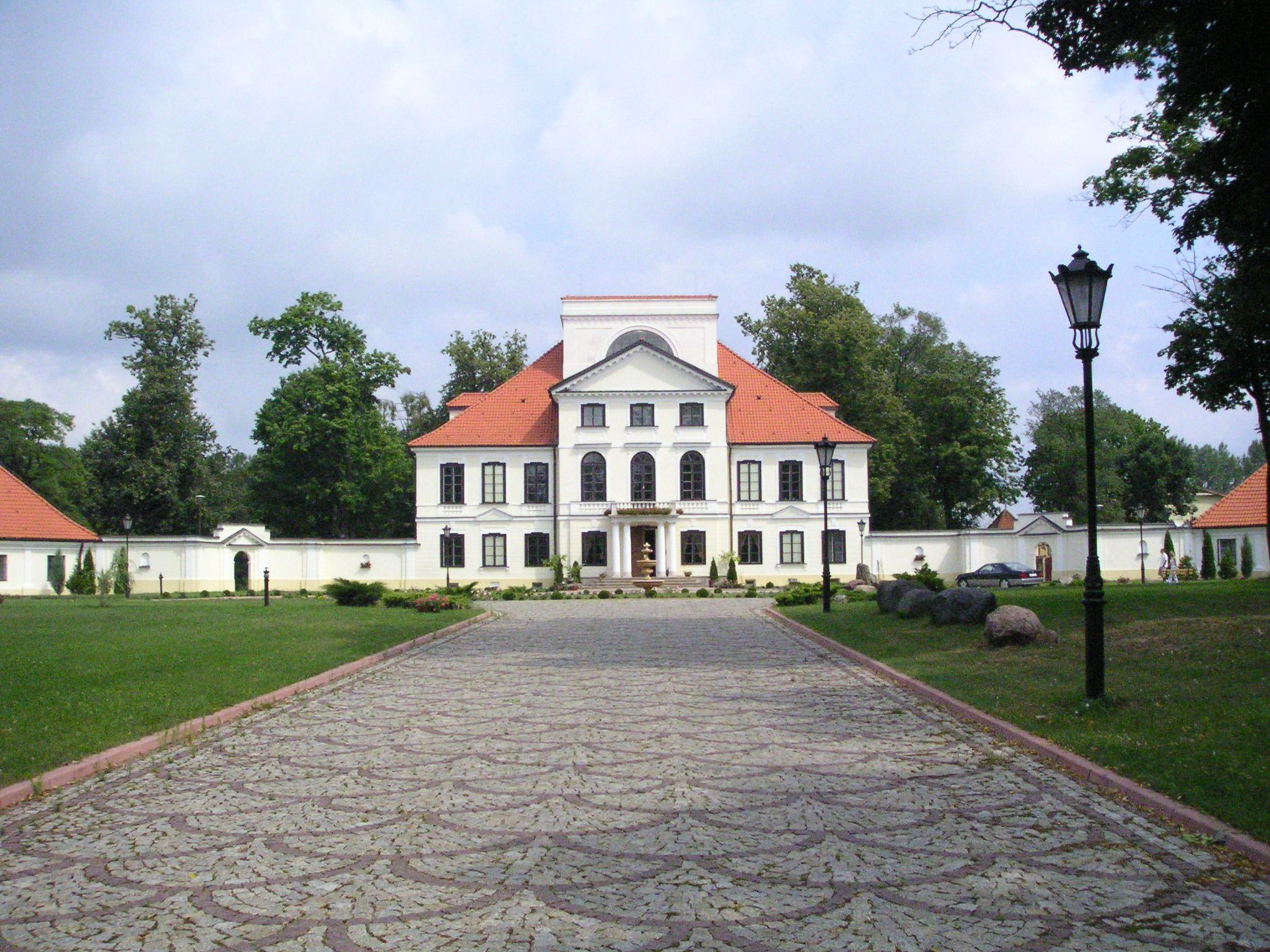
- Sterdyń Palace

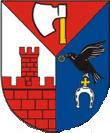
- Coat of arms

- Location within Poland
- Coordinates: 52°34′N 22°17′E
- Country: Poland
- Voivodeship: Masovian
- County: Sokołów
- Gmina: Sterdyń

Population
  - Total: 814
- Time zone: UTC+1 (CET)
  - Summer (DST): UTC+2 (CEST)

Sterdyń [ˈstɛrdɨɲ] is a village in Sokołów County, Masovian Voivodeship, in eastern Poland. It is the seat of the gmina (administrative district) called Gmina Sterdyń.

== History ==
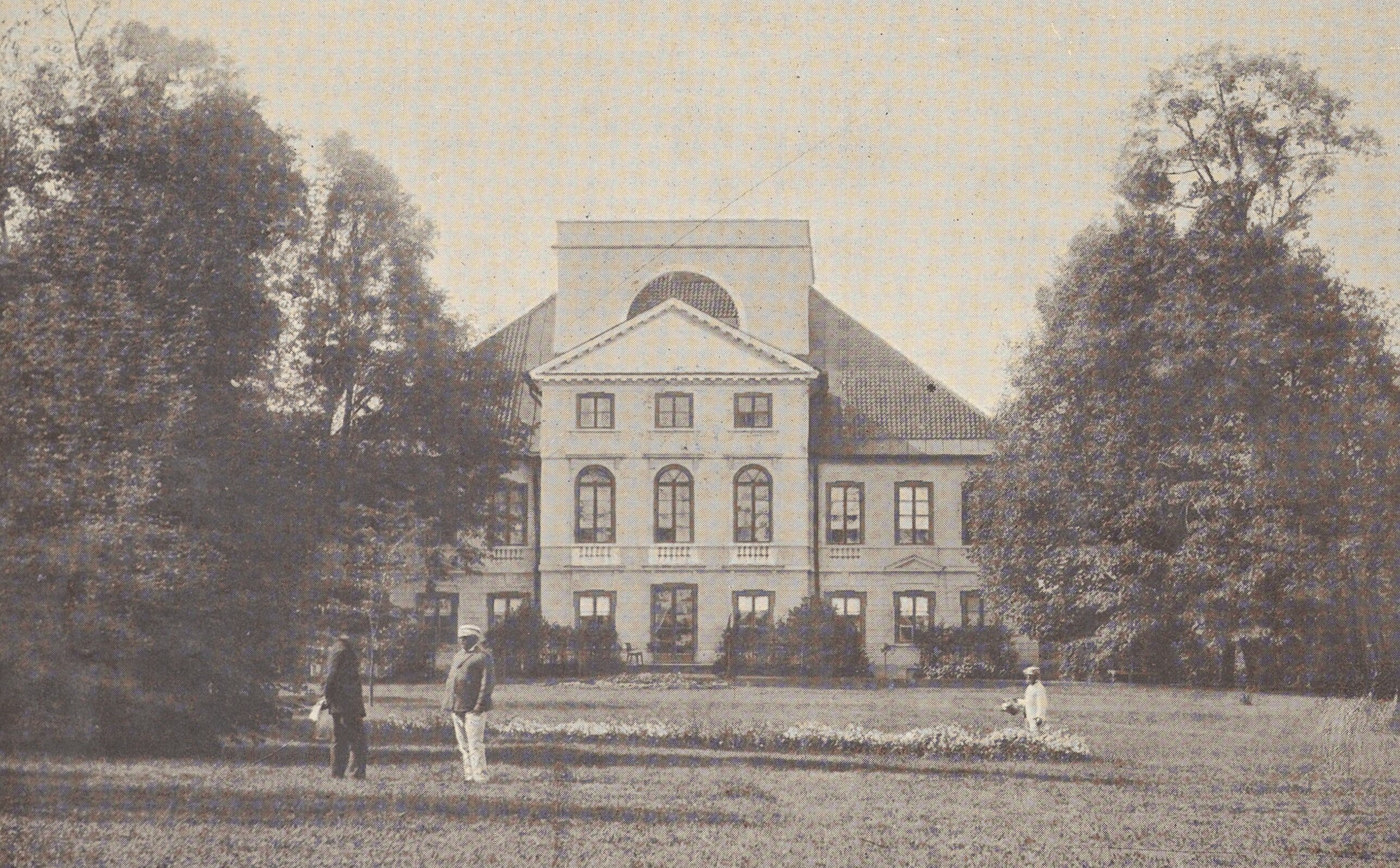
Palace before 1911

It was a private town, administratively located in the Drohiczyn County in the Podlaskie Voivodeship in the Lesser Poland Province of the Kingdom of Poland.
