= Czerniewice =

- Village
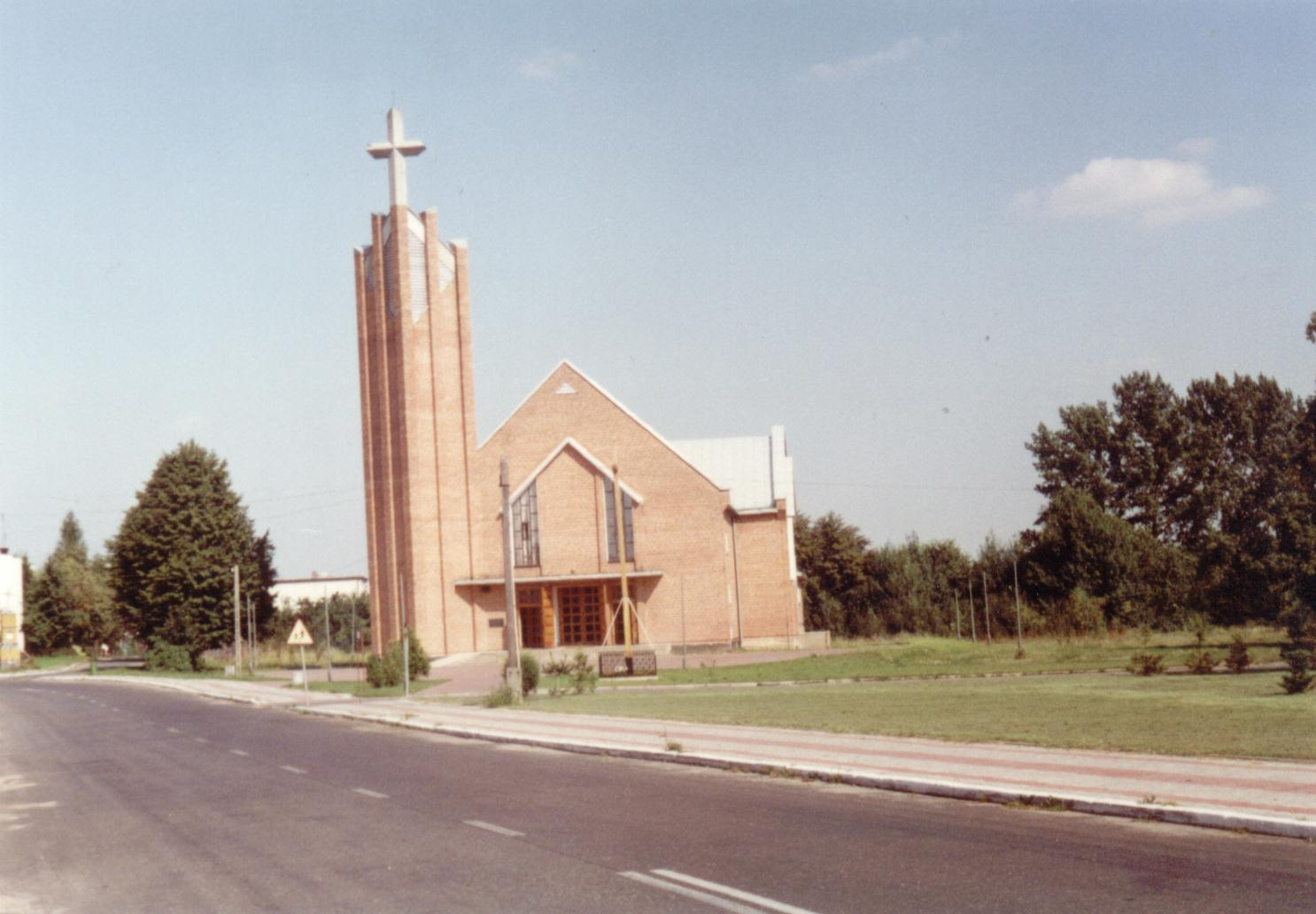
- New church in Czerniewice

- Location within Poland
- Coordinates: 51°39′27″N 20°9′27″E
- Country: Poland
- Voivodeship: Łódź
- County: Tomaszów
- Gmina: Czerniewice
- Population (approx.): 730

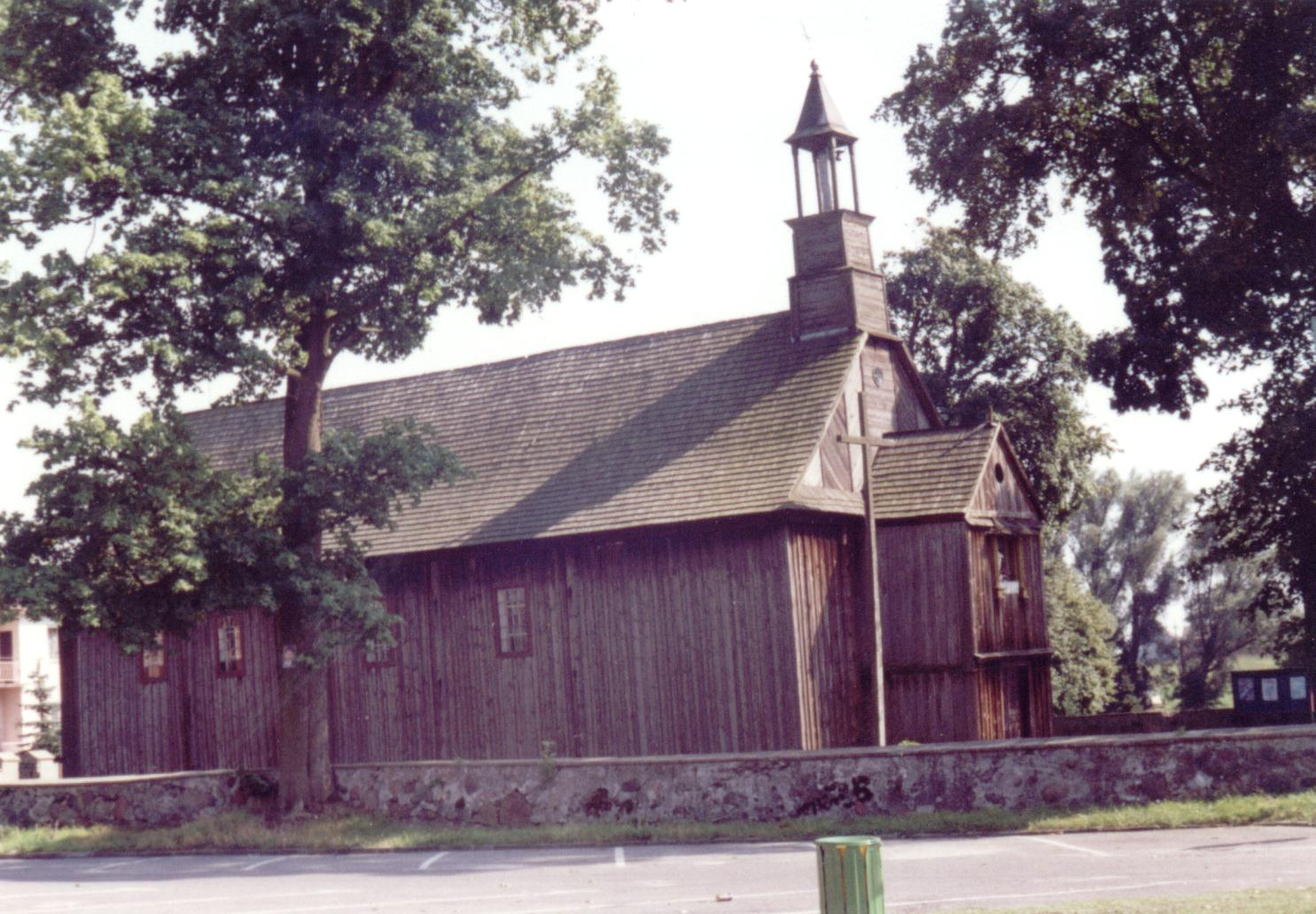
Old church in Czerniewice

Czerniewice [t͡ʂɛrɲɛˈvit͡sɛ] is a village in Tomaszów County, Łódź Voivodeship, in central Poland. It is the seat of the gmina (administrative district) called Gmina Czerniewice. It was probably founded in the 14th century.

In 2004 the village had a population of 730.
