= Teodozjów, Gmina Czerniewice =

Teodozjów
- Village
- Location within Poland
- Coordinates: 51°40′45″N 20°6′47″E
- Country: Poland
- Voivodeship: Łódź
- County: Tomaszów
- Gmina: Czerniewice

Teodozjów [tɛɔˈdɔzjuf] is a village in the administrative district of Gmina Czerniewice, within Tomaszów County, Łódź Voivodeship, in central Poland.
