= Szymankowszczyzna =

- Village
- Location within Poland
- Coordinates: 52°14′37″N 21°34′37″E
- Country: Poland
- Voivodeship: Masovian
- County: Mińsk
- Gmina: Stanisławów
- Population: 96

Szymankowszczyzna (Polish pronunciation: [ʂɨmaŋkɔfʂˈt͡ʂɨzna]) is a village in the administrative district of Gmina Stanisławów, within Mińsk County, Masovian Voivodeship, in east-central Poland.
