= Szwejki, Sokołów County =

Szwejki
- Village
- Location within Poland
- Coordinates: 52°33′N 22°20′E
- Country: Poland
- Voivodeship: Masovian
- County: Sokołów
- Gmina: Sterdyń

Szwejki (Polish pronunciation: [ˈʂfɛi̯ki]) is a village in the administrative district of Gmina Sterdyń, within Sokołów County, Masovian Voivodeship, in east-central Poland.
