= Mała Wola =

- Village
- Location within Poland
- Coordinates: 51°38′N 20°13′E
- Country: Poland
- Voivodeship: Łódź
- County: Tomaszów
- Gmina: Czerniewice

Mała Wola [ˈmawa ˈvɔla] is a village in the administrative district of Gmina Czerniewice, within Tomaszów County, Łódź Voivodeship, in central Poland.
