= Wólka Wybraniecka =

- Village
- Location within Poland
- Coordinates: 52°15′47″N 21°30′49″E
- Country: Poland
- Voivodeship: Masovian
- County: Mińsk
- Gmina: Stanisławów
- Population: 112

Wólka Wybraniecka [ˈvulka vɨbraˈɲɛt͡ska] is a village in the administrative district of Gmina Stanisławów, within Mińsk County, Masovian Voivodeship, in east-central Poland.
