= Zalesie, Gmina Stanisławów =

Zalesie
- Village
- Location within Poland
- Coordinates: 52°16′25″N 21°30′35″E
- Country: Poland
- Voivodeship: Masovian
- County: Mińsk
- Gmina: Stanisławów

Population
  - Total: 156
- Postal code: 05-304

Zalesie [zaˈlɛɕɛ] is a village in the administrative district of Gmina Stanisławów, within Mińsk County, Masovian Voivodeship, in east-central Poland.
