= Papiernia, Masovian Voivodeship =

Papiernia
- Village
- Location within Poland
- Coordinates: 52°19′09″N 21°30′19″E
- Country: Poland
- Voivodeship: Masovian
- County: Mińsk
- Gmina: Stanisławów
- Population: 195

Papiernia [paˈpjɛrɲa] is a village in the administrative district of Gmina Stanisławów, within Mińsk County, Masovian Voivodeship, in east-central Poland.
