= Łęka, Masovian Voivodeship =

Łęka
- Village
- Location within Poland
- Coordinates: 52°17′N 21°26′E
- Country: Poland
- Voivodeship: Masovian
- County: Mińsk
- Gmina: Stanisławów
- Population: 121

Łęka [ˈwɛnka] is a village in the administrative district of Gmina Stanisławów, within Mińsk County, Masovian Voivodeship, in east-central Poland.
