= Strzemeszna =

- Village
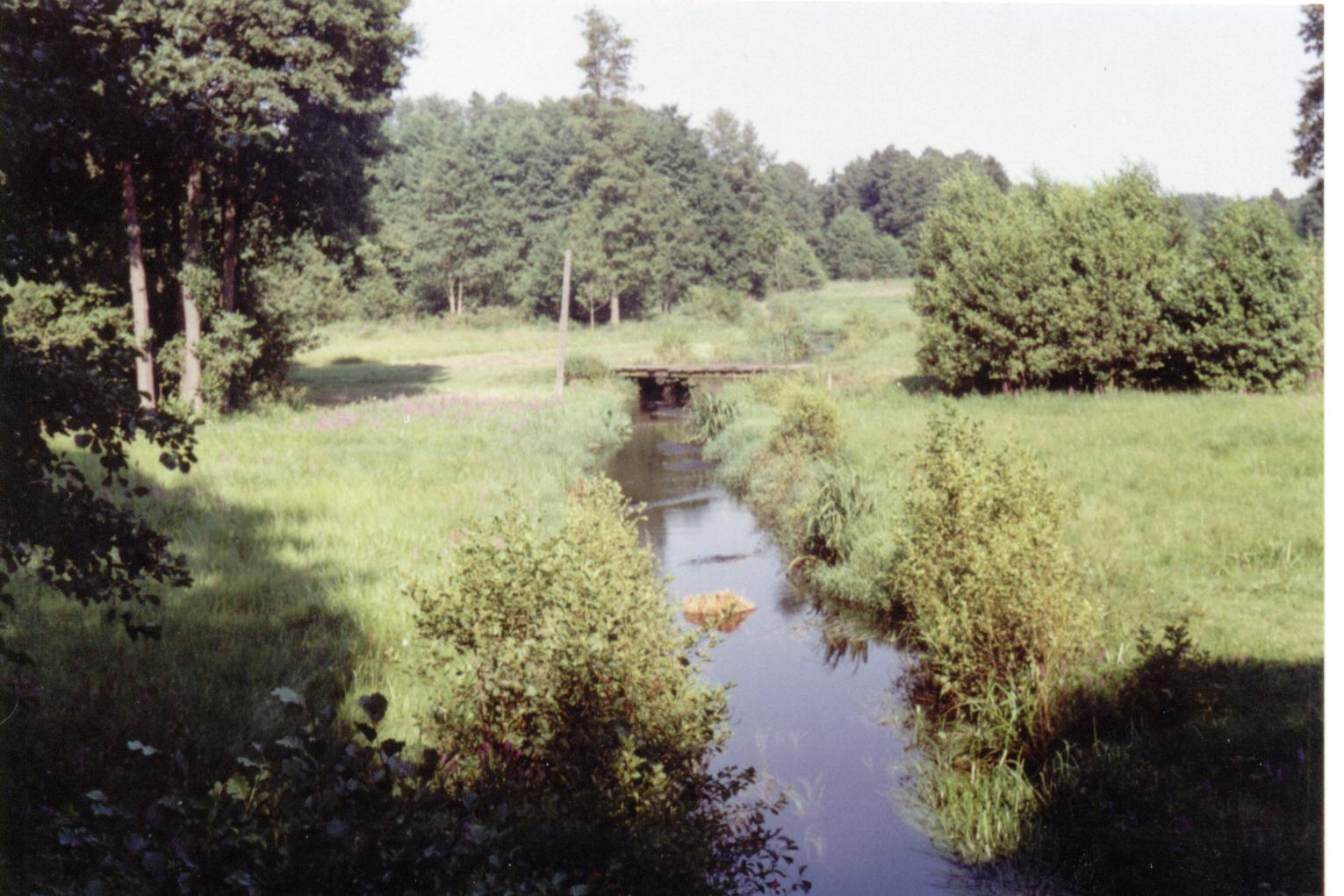

- Location within Poland
- Coordinates: 51°39′47″N 20°12′36″E
- Country: Poland
- Voivodeship: Łódź
- County: Tomaszów
- Gmina: Czerniewice
- Population (approx.): 350

Strzemeszna [stʂɛˈmɛʂna] is a village in the administrative district of Gmina Czerniewice, within Tomaszów County, Łódź Voivodeship, in central Poland.

The village has an approximate population of 350.
