= Lubomin, Gmina Stanisławów =

Lubomin
- Village
- Location within Poland
- Coordinates: 52°15′N 21°33′E
- Country: Poland
- Voivodeship: Masovian
- County: Mińsk
- Gmina: Stanisławów
- Population (approx.): 70

Lubomin [luˈbɔmin] is a village in the administrative district of Gmina Stanisławów, within Mińsk County, Masovian Voivodeship, in east-central Poland.
