= Wólka Jagielczyńska =

- Village
- Location within Poland
- Coordinates: 51°41′N 20°11′E
- Country: Poland
- Voivodeship: Łódź
- County: Tomaszów
- Gmina: Czerniewice

Wólka Jagielczyńska (Polish pronunciation: [ˈvulka jaɡʲɛlˈt͡ʂɨj̃ska]) is a village in the administrative district of Gmina Czerniewice, within Tomaszów County, Łódź Voivodeship, in central Poland.
