= Dąbrówka, Sokołów County =

Village in Gmina Sterdyń, Poland

Dąbrówka
- Village
- Location within Poland
- Coordinates: 52°33′26″N 22°17′48″E
- Country: Poland
- Voivodeship: Masovian Voivodeship
- County: Sokołów
- Gmina: Sterdyń
- Postal code: 08-320
- Vehicle registration: WSK

Dąbrówka [dɔmˈbrufka] is a village in the administrative district of Gmina Sterdyń, within Sokołów County, Masovian Voivodeship, in east-central Poland.
