= Kolonia Kamieńczykowska =

Village in Gmina Sterdyń, Poland

- Village
- Location within Poland
- Coordinates: 52°34′19″N 22°25′21″E
- Country: Poland
- Voivodeship: Masovian
- County: Sokołów
- Gmina: Sterdyń

Kolonia Kamieńczykowska [kɔˈlɔɲa kamjɛɲt͡ʂɨˈkɔfska] is a village in the administrative district of Gmina Sterdyń, within Sokołów County, Masovian Voivodeship, in east-central Poland.
