= Wólka Czarnińska =

- Village
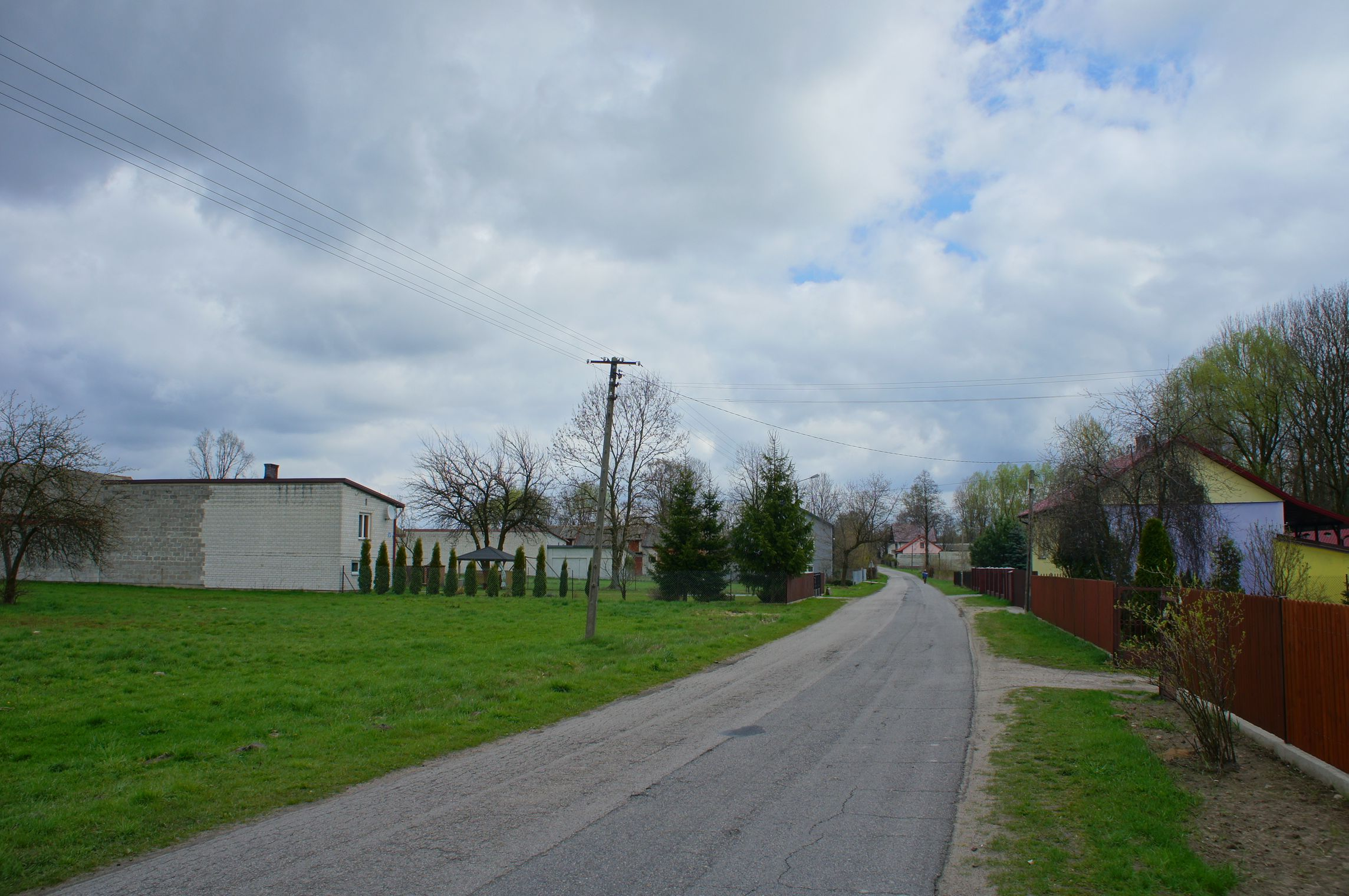

- Location within Poland
- Coordinates: 52°16′N 21°33′E
- Country: Poland
- Voivodeship: Masovian
- County: Mińsk
- Gmina: Stanisławów
- Population: 237

Wólka Czarnińska [ˈvulka t͡ʂarˈniɲska] is a village in the administrative district of Gmina Stanisławów, within Mińsk County, Masovian Voivodeship, in east-central Poland.
