= Dąbrówka, Gmina Czerniewice =

Dąbrówka
- Village
- Location within Poland
- Coordinates: 51°38′N 20°9′E
- Country: Poland
- Voivodeship: Łódź
- County: Tomaszów
- Gmina: Czerniewice

Dąbrówka [dɔmˈbrufka] is a village in the administrative district of Gmina Czerniewice, within Tomaszów County, Łódź Voivodeship, in central Poland.
