= Sewerynówka, Masovian Voivodeship =

Sewerynówka
- Village
- Location within Poland
- Coordinates: 52°32′N 22°23′E
- Country: Poland
- Voivodeship: Masovian
- County: Sokołów
- Gmina: Sterdyń

Sewerynówka [sɛvɛrɨˈnufka] is a village in the administrative district of Gmina Sterdyń, within Sokołów County, Masovian Voivodeship, in east-central Poland. The village was featured in the 3rd season of The Simpsons.
