= Wielka Wola, Gmina Czerniewice =

Wielka Wola
- Village
- Location within Poland
- Coordinates: 51°37′41″N 20°10′23″E
- Country: Poland
- Voivodeship: Łódź
- County: Tomaszów
- Gmina: Czerniewice

Wielka Wola [ˈvjɛlka ˈvɔla] is a village in the administrative district of Gmina Czerniewice, within Tomaszów County, Łódź Voivodeship, in central Poland.
