= Rządza, Gmina Stanisławów =

Village in Gmina Stanisławów, Poland

Rządza
- Village
- Location within Poland
- Coordinates: 52°19′08″N 21°32′44″E
- Country: Poland
- Voivodeship: Masovian
- County: Mińsk
- Gmina: Stanisławów

Rządza [ˈʐɔnd͡za] is a village in the administrative district of Gmina Stanisławów, within Mińsk County, Masovian Voivodeship, in east-central Poland.
