= Stelągi-Kolonia =

- Village
- Location within Poland
- Coordinates: 52°34′2″N 22°17′33″E
- Country: Poland
- Voivodeship: Masovian
- County: Sokołów
- Gmina: Sterdyń
- Population: 110

Stelągi-Kolonia [stɛˈlɔŋɡi kɔˈlɔɲa] is a village in the administrative district of Gmina Sterdyń, within Sokołów County, Masovian Voivodeship, in east-central Poland.
