= Choiny, Mińsk County =

Choiny
- Village
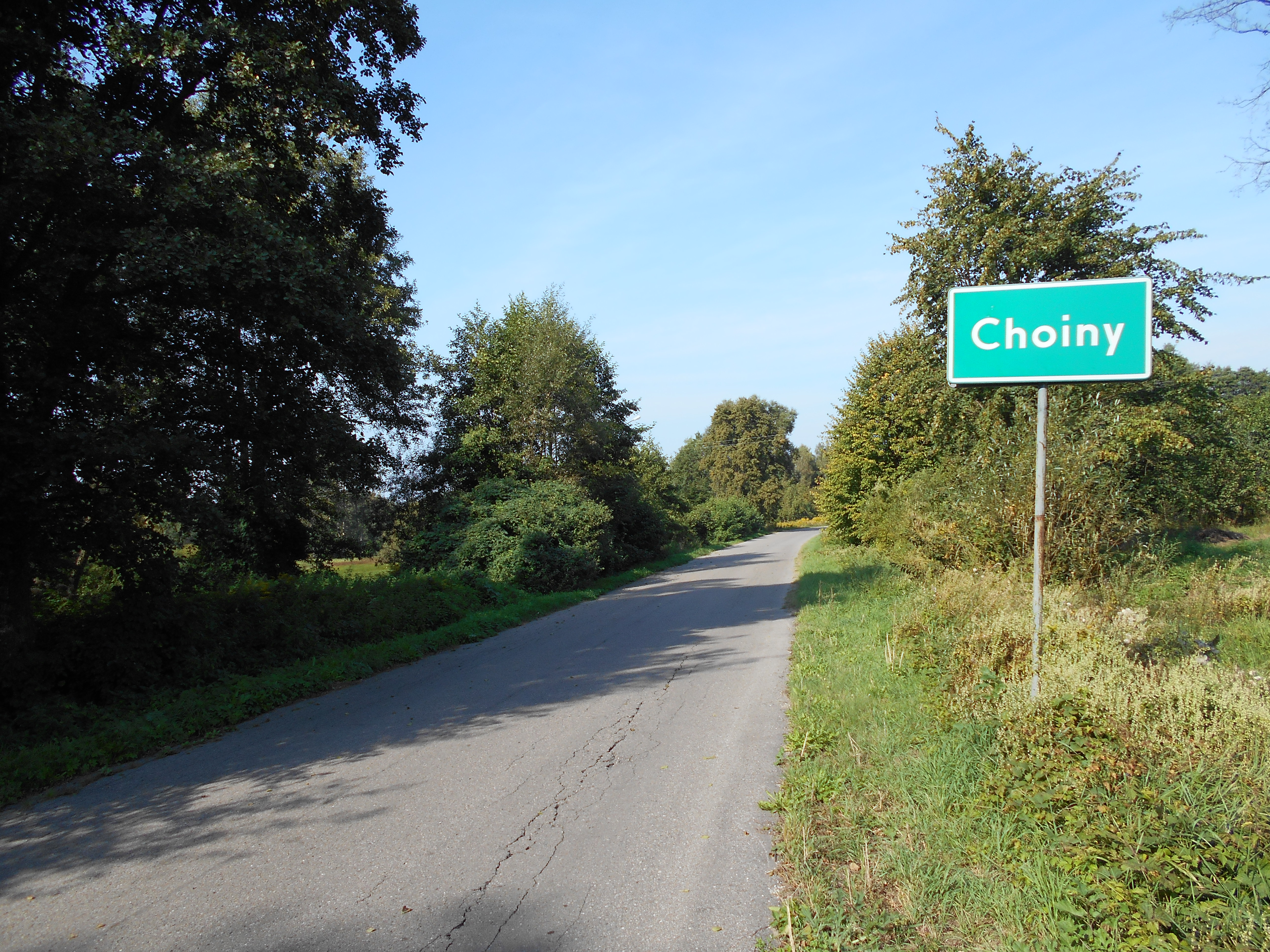
- Road sign as you enter the village of Choiny

- Location within Poland
- Coordinates: 52°17′07″N 21°26′08″E
- Country: Poland
- Voivodeship: Masovian
- County: Mińsk
- Gmina: Stanisławów
- Population: 160

Choiny [ˈxɔi̯nɨ] is a village in the administrative district of Gmina Stanisławów, within Mińsk County, Masovian Voivodeship, in east-central Poland.
