= Lebiedzie =

- Village
- Location within Poland
- Coordinates: 52°35′N 22°18′E
- Country: Poland
- Voivodeship: Masovian
- County: Sokołów
- Gmina: Sterdyń

Lebiedzie [lɛˈbjɛd͡ʑɛ] is a village in the administrative district of Gmina Sterdyń, within Sokołów County, Masovian Voivodeship, in east-central Poland.
