= Chociw, Gmina Czerniewice =

Chociw
- Village
- Location within Poland
- Coordinates: 51°40′30″N 20°15′27″E
- Country: Poland
- Voivodeship: Łódź
- County: Tomaszów
- Gmina: Czerniewice
- Population: 650
- Website: http://chociw.info

Chociw [ˈxɔt͡ɕif] is a village in the administrative district of Gmina Czerniewice, within Tomaszów County, Łódź Voivodeship, in central Poland.
