= Kolonia Dzięcioły Dalsze =

Village in Gmina Sterdyń, Poland

- Village
- Location within Poland
- Coordinates: 52°36′36″N 22°17′05″E
- Country: Poland
- Voivodeship: Masovian
- County: Sokołów
- Gmina: Sterdyń

Kolonia Dzięcioły Dalsze [kɔˈlɔɲa d͡ʑɛnˈt͡ɕɔwɨ ˈdalʂɛ] is a village in the administrative district of Gmina Sterdyń, within Sokołów County, Masovian Voivodeship, in east-central Poland.
