= Czarna, Mińsk County =

Czarna
- Village
- Location within Poland
- Coordinates: 52°15′N 21°35′E
- Country: Poland
- Voivodeship: Masovian
- County: Mińsk
- Gmina: Stanisławów
- Population: 142

Czarna [ˈt͡ʂarna] is a village in the administrative district of Gmina Stanisławów, within Mińsk County, Masovian Voivodeship, in east-central Poland.
