= Stanisławowo =

Stanisławowo may refer to the following places:

- Stanisławowo, Legionowo County in Masovian Voivodeship (east-central Poland)
- Stanisławowo, Białystok County in Podlaskie Voivodeship (north-east Poland)
- Stanisławowo, Łomża County in Podlaskie Voivodeship (north-east Poland)
- Stanisławowo, Gmina Pomiechówek, Nowy Dwór County in Masovian Voivodeship (east-central Poland)
- Stanisławowo, Płock County in Masovian Voivodeship (east-central Poland)
- Stanisławowo, Żuromin County in Masovian Voivodeship (east-central Poland)
- Stanisławowo, Konin County in Greater Poland Voivodeship (west-central Poland)
- Stanisławowo, Września County in Greater Poland Voivodeship (west-central Poland)
- Stanisławowo, Pomeranian Voivodeship (north Poland)

== See also ==
- Stanisławów (disambiguation)
