= Kolonia Stary Ratyniec =

- Village
- Location within Poland
- Coordinates: 52°33′00″N 22°15′53″E
- Country: Poland
- Voivodeship: Masovian
- County: Sokołów
- Gmina: Sterdyń

Kolonia Stary Ratyniec [kɔˈlɔɲa ˈstarɨ raˈtɨɲɛt͡s] is a village in the administrative district of Gmina Sterdyń, within Sokołów County, Masovian Voivodeship, in east-central Poland.
