= Helenów, Gmina Czerniewice =

Helenów
- Village
- Location within Poland
- Coordinates: 51°39′55″N 20°4′35″E
- Country: Poland
- Voivodeship: Łódź
- County: Tomaszów
- Gmina: Czerniewice

Helenów [xɛˈlɛnuf] is a village in the administrative district of Gmina Czerniewice, within Tomaszów County, Łódź Voivodeship, in central Poland.
