= Nowe Mursy =

- Village
- Location within Poland
- Coordinates: 52°34′02″N 22°15′55″E
- Country: Poland
- Voivodeship: Masovian
- County: Sokołów
- Gmina: Sterdyń

Nowe Mursy [ˈnɔvɛ ˈmursɨ] is a village in the administrative district of Gmina Sterdyń, within Sokołów County, Masovian Voivodeship, in east-central Poland.
