= Gmina Sterdyń =

Gmina Sterdyń Sterdyń Commune
- Gmina
- Coat of arms
- Interactive map of Gmina Sterdyń
- Coordinates (Sterdyń): 52°34′N 22°17′E
- Country: Poland
- Voivodeship: Masovian
- County: Sokołów
- Seat: Sterdyń

Area
  - Total: 130.03 km^{2} (50.20 sq mi)

Population (2013)
  - Total: 4,307
  - Density: 33.12/km^{2} (85.79/sq mi)
- Website: http://www.sterdyn.nwg.pl

Gmina Sterdyń is a rural gmina (administrative district) in Sokołów County, Masovian Voivodeship, in east-central Poland. Its seat is the village of Sterdyń, which lies approximately 19 kilometres (12 mi) north of Sokołów Podlaski and 95 km (59 mi) north-east of Warsaw.

The gmina covers an area of 130.03 square kilometres (50.2 sq mi), and as of 2006 its total population is 4,507 (4,307 in 2013).

== Villages ==
Gmina Sterdyń contains the villages and settlements of Białobrzegi, Borki, Chądzyń, Dąbrówka, Dzięcioły Bliższe, Dzięcioły Dalsze, Dzięcioły-Kolonia, Golanki, Grądy, Granie, Kamieńczyk, Kiełpiniec, Kiezie, Kolonia Dzięcioły Dalsze, Kolonia Kamieńczykowska, Kolonia Kuczaby, Kolonia Paderewek, Kolonia Stary Ratyniec, Kuczaby, Łazów, Łazówek, Lebiedzie, Lebiedzie-Kolonia, Matejki, Nowe Mursy, Nowy Ratyniec, Paderew, Paderewek, Paulinów, Seroczyn, Seroczyn-Kolonia, Sewerynówka, Stare Mursy, Stary Ratyniec, Stelągi, Stelągi-Kolonia, Sterdyń, Szwejki and Zaleś.

== Neighbouring gminas ==
Gmina Sterdyń is bordered by the gminas of Ceranów, Ciechanowiec, Jabłonna Lacka, Kosów Lacki, Nur, Sabnie and Sokołów Podlaski.
