= Legacz =

- Village
- Location within Poland
- Coordinates: 52°16′34″N 21°32′24″E
- Country: Poland
- Voivodeship: Masovian
- County: Mińsk
- Gmina: Stanisławów
- Population: 70

Legacz [ˈlɛɡat͡ʂ] is a village in the administrative district of Gmina Stanisławów, within Mińsk County, Masovian Voivodeship, in east-central Poland.
