= Borek Czarniński =

- Village
- Location within Poland
- Coordinates: 52°14′17″N 21°34′45″E
- Country: Poland
- Voivodeship: Masovian
- County: Mińsk
- Gmina: Stanisławów

Borek Czarniński [ˈbɔrɛk t͡ʂarˈniɲski] is a village in the administrative district of Gmina Stanisławów, within Mińsk County, Masovian Voivodeship, in east-central Poland.
