= Łazów, Masovian Voivodeship =

Łazów
- Village
- Location within Poland
- Coordinates: 52°33′N 22°22′E
- Country: Poland
- Voivodeship: Masovian
- County: Sokołów
- Gmina: Sterdyń
- Population: 300

Łazów [ˈwazuf] is a village in the administrative district of Gmina Sterdyń, within Sokołów County, Masovian Voivodeship, in east-central Poland.
