= Kiezie =

- Village
- Location within Poland
- Coordinates: 52°36′36″N 22°22′28″E
- Country: Poland
- Voivodeship: Masovian
- County: Sokołów
- Gmina: Sterdyń

Kiezie [ˈkʲɛʑɛ] is a village in the administrative district of Gmina Sterdyń, within Sokołów County, Masovian Voivodeship, in east-central Poland.
