= Nowe Studzianki =

- Village
- Location within Poland
- Coordinates: 51°39′20″N 20°07′15″E
- Country: Poland
- Voivodeship: Łódź
- County: Tomaszów
- Gmina: Czerniewice

Nowe Studzianki [ˈnɔvɛ stuˈd͡ʑaŋki] is a village in the administrative district of Gmina Czerniewice, within Tomaszów County, Łódź Voivodeship, in central Poland.
