= Stanisławów, Mińsk County =

Stanisławów
- Town
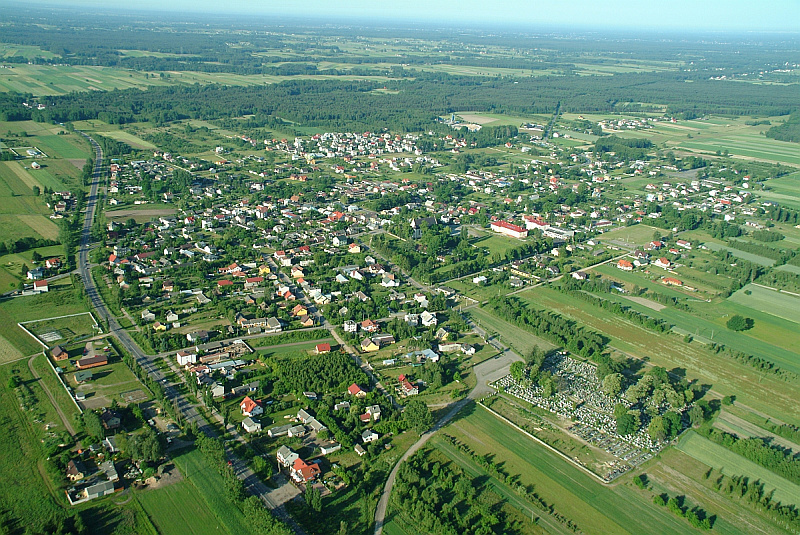
- Aerial view of Stanisławów

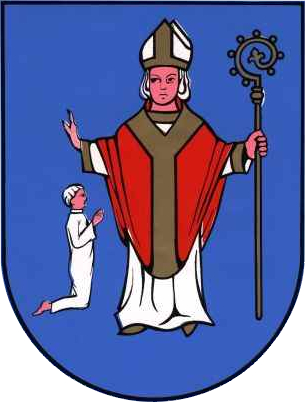
- Coat of arms

- Location within Poland
- Coordinates: 52°17′N 21°33′E
- Country: Poland
- Voivodeship: Masovian
- County: Mińsk
- Gmina: Stanisławów
- Town rights: 1523

Population
  - Total: 2,200
- Time zone: UTC+1 (CET)
  - Summer (DST): UTC+2 (CEST)
- Vehicle registration: WM

Stanisławów ([staniˈswavuf]) is a town in Mińsk County, Masovian Voivodeship, in east-central Poland. It is the seat of the gmina (administrative district) called Gmina Stanisławów.

== History ==
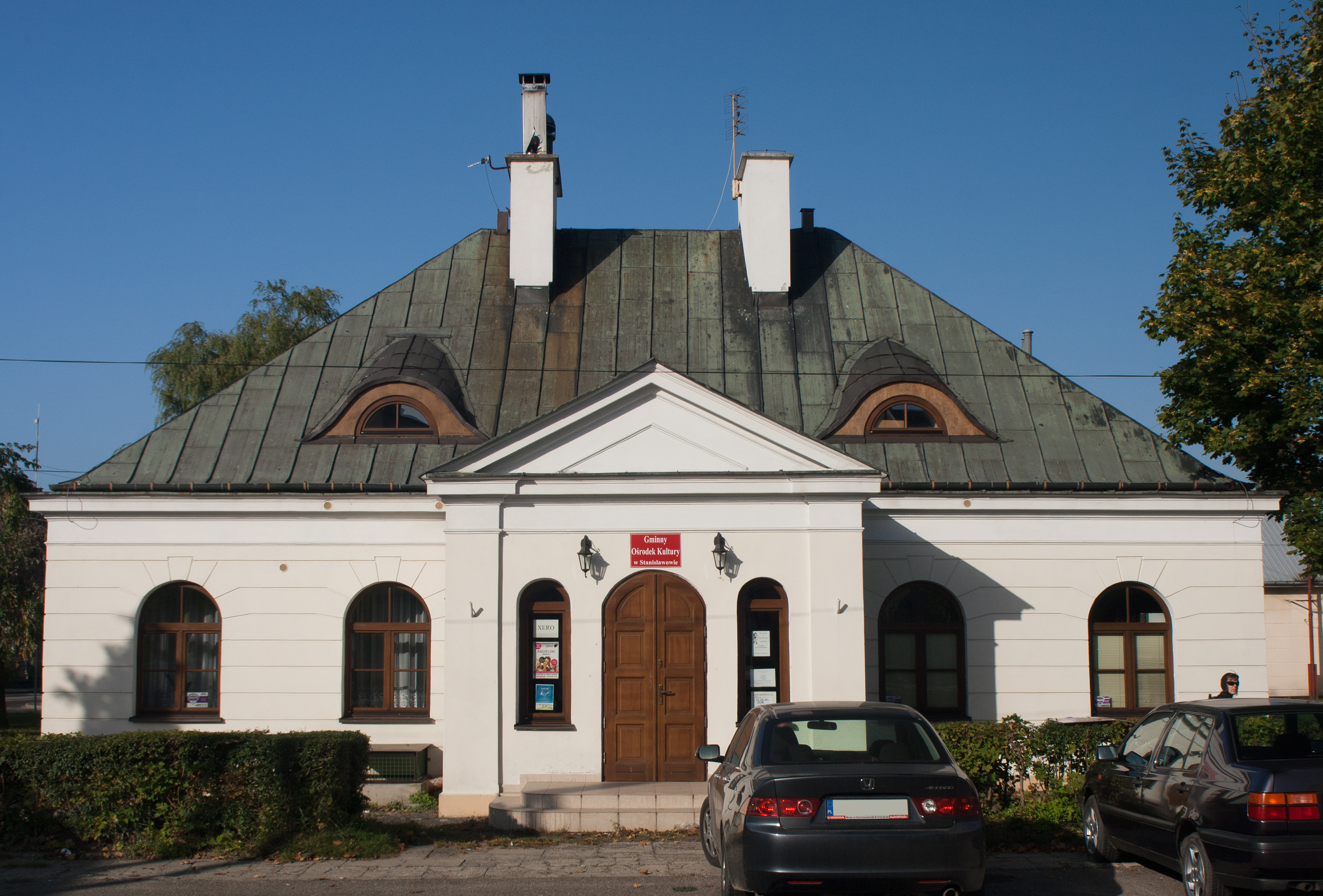
Old inn, now a culture center

Stanisławów was granted town rights in 1523. Stanisławów was a royal town of the Kingdom of Poland, administratively located in the Warsaw County in the Masovian Voivodeship in the Greater Poland Province.

Following the German-Soviet invasion of Poland, which started World War II in September 1939, Stanisławów was occupied by Germany until 1944. Afterwards, it was restored to Poland, although with a Soviet-installed communist regime, which stayed in power until the Fall of Communism in the 1980s. In 1945–1947, the Polish anti-communist resistance carried out two raids of the local communist police station.
