= Kostana =

Kostana may refer to:

- Koštana, a 1902 play by Borisav Stanković
- Milea, Thesprotia, a village in Greece formerly called Kostana
