= Paulinów, Masovian Voivodeship =

Paulinów
- Village
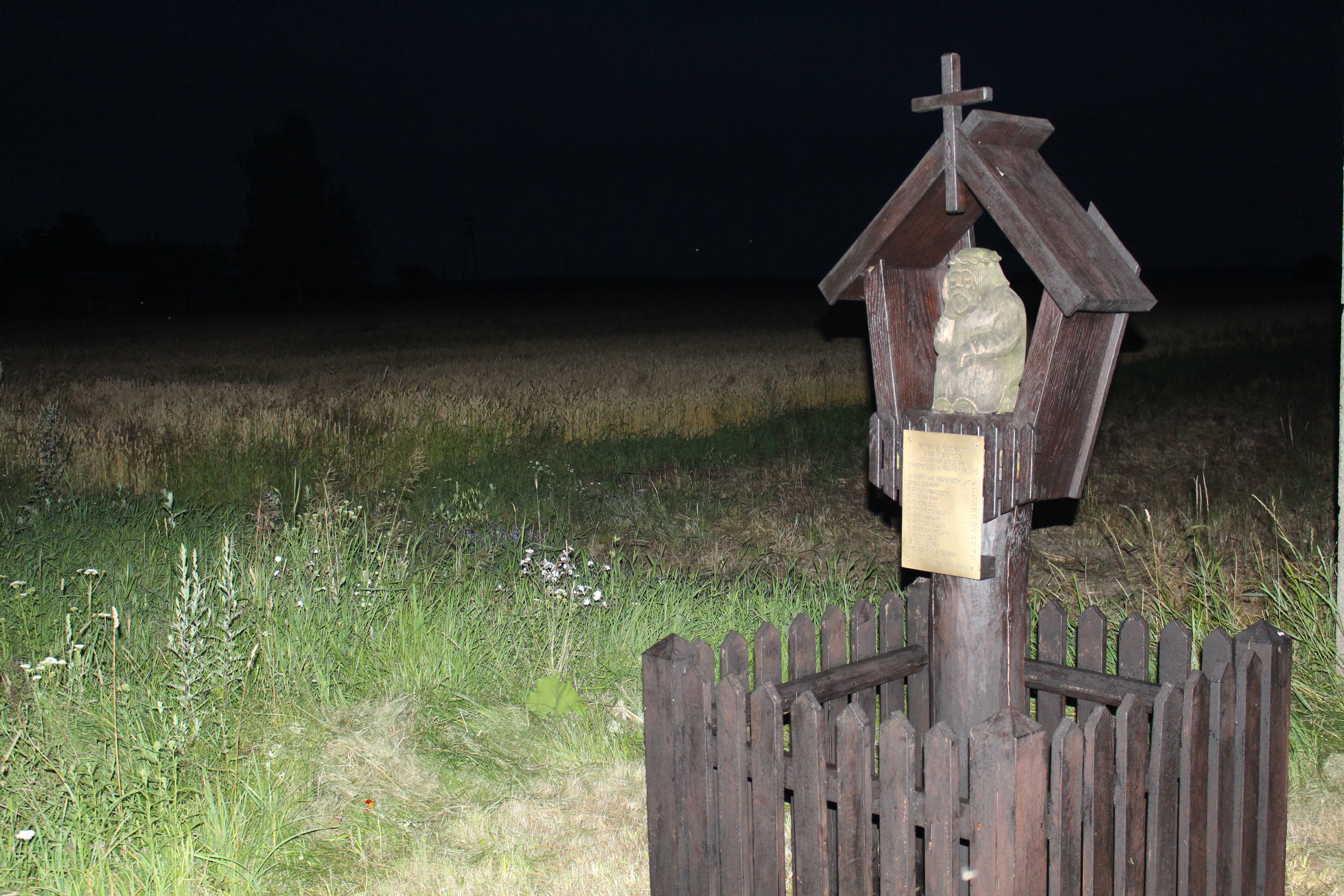
- Memorial to the victims of the German-perpetrated massacre from 1943

- Location within Poland
- Coordinates: 52°32′54″N 22°17′52″E
- Country: Poland
- Voivodeship: Masovian
- County: Sokołów
- Gmina: Sterdyń
- Time zone: UTC+1 (CET)
  - Summer (DST): UTC+2 (CEST)
- Vehicle registration: WSK

Paulinów [pau̯ˈlinuf] is a village in the administrative district of Gmina Sterdyń, within Sokołów County, Masovian Voivodeship, in east-central Poland.

During World War II, the village was occupied by Germany. Several people in the village helped to hide Jews. The Germans used a Jewish agent to pose as an escapee looking for a hiding place with a Polish family, after receiving help the agent denounced the Polish family to the Germans, resulting in a German-perpetrated massacre of 12 Poles and several Jews who were hiding with the family, committed on 24 February 1943.
