= Mały Stanisławów =

- Village
- Location within Poland
- Coordinates: 52°17′09″N 21°31′36″E
- Country: Poland
- Voivodeship: Masovian
- County: Mińsk
- Gmina: Stanisławów

Population
  - Total: 92
- Time zone: UTC+1 (CET)
  - Summer (DST): UTC+2 (CEST)
- Vehicle registration: WM

Mały Stanisławów [ˈmawɨ staniˈswavuf] is a village in the administrative district of Gmina Stanisławów, within Mińsk County, Masovian Voivodeship, in east-central Poland.

== History ==
Nine Polish citizens were murdered by Nazi Germany in the village during World War II.
