= Annów, Gmina Czerniewice =

Annów
- Village
- Location within Poland
- Coordinates: 51°38′34″N 20°11′28″E
- Country: Poland
- Voivodeship: Łódź
- County: Tomaszów
- Gmina: Czerniewice

Annów [ˈannuf] is a village in the administrative district of Gmina Czerniewice, within Tomaszów County, Łódź Voivodeship, in central Poland. The population is 187.
