= Zagóry, Łódź Voivodeship =

Zagóry
- Village
- Location within Poland
- Coordinates: 51°39′54″N 20°10′06″E
- Country: Poland
- Voivodeship: Łódź
- County: Tomaszów
- Gmina: Czerniewice

Zagóry [zaˈɡurɨ] is a village in the administrative district of Gmina Czerniewice, within Tomaszów County, Łódź Voivodeship, in central Poland.
