= Krzemienica, Łódź Voivodeship =

Krzemienica
- Village
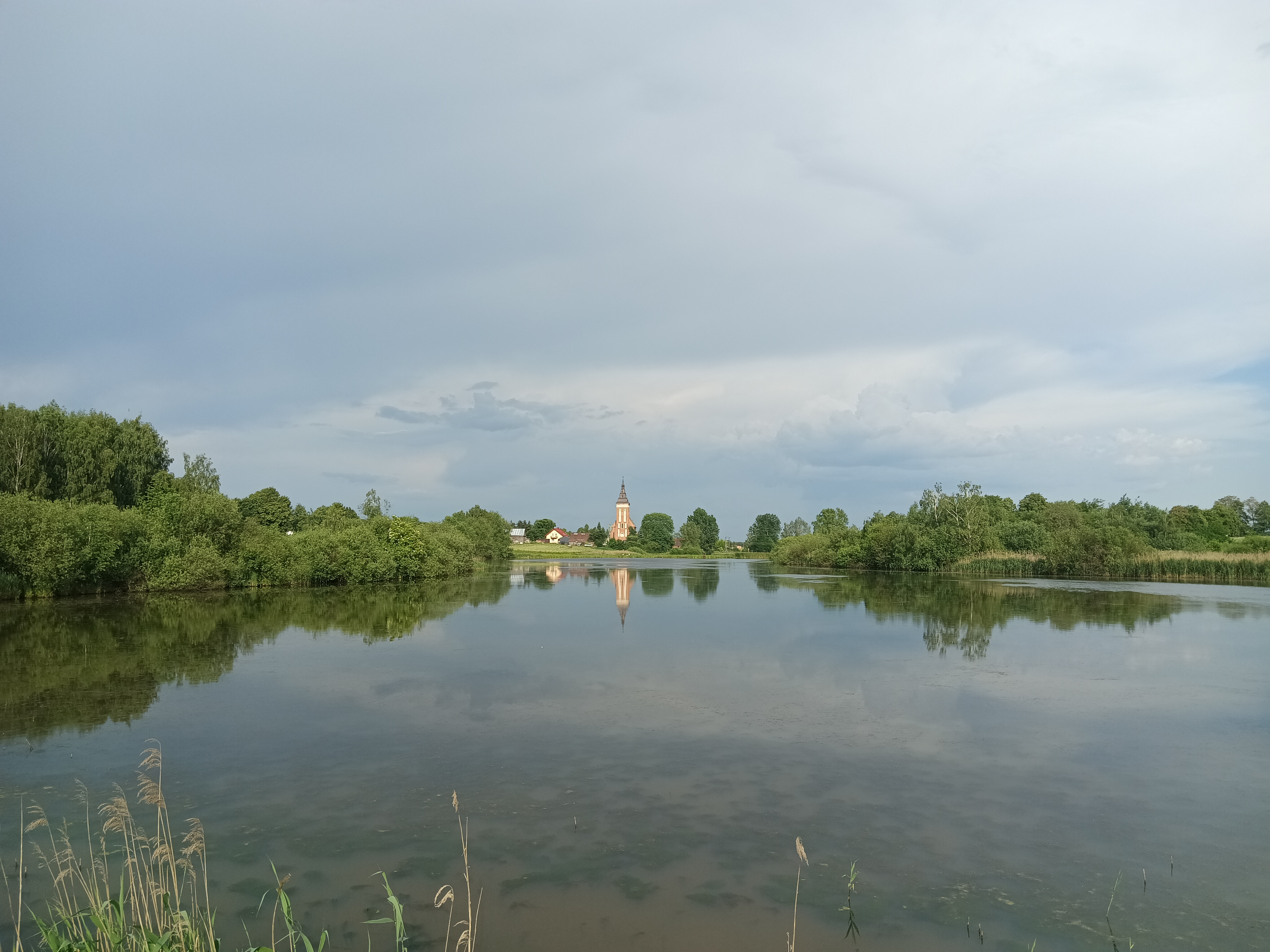
- View of the village from the west (2024)

- Location within Poland
- Coordinates: 51°40′35″N 20°12′48″E
- Country: Poland
- Voivodeship: Łódź
- County: Tomaszów
- Gmina: Czerniewice
- Population (approx.): 210

Krzemienica [kʂɛmjɛˈnit͡sa] is a village in the administrative district of Gmina Czerniewice, within Tomaszów County, Łódź Voivodeship, in central Poland.

The village has an approximate population of 210.

== Gallery ==
The second pond

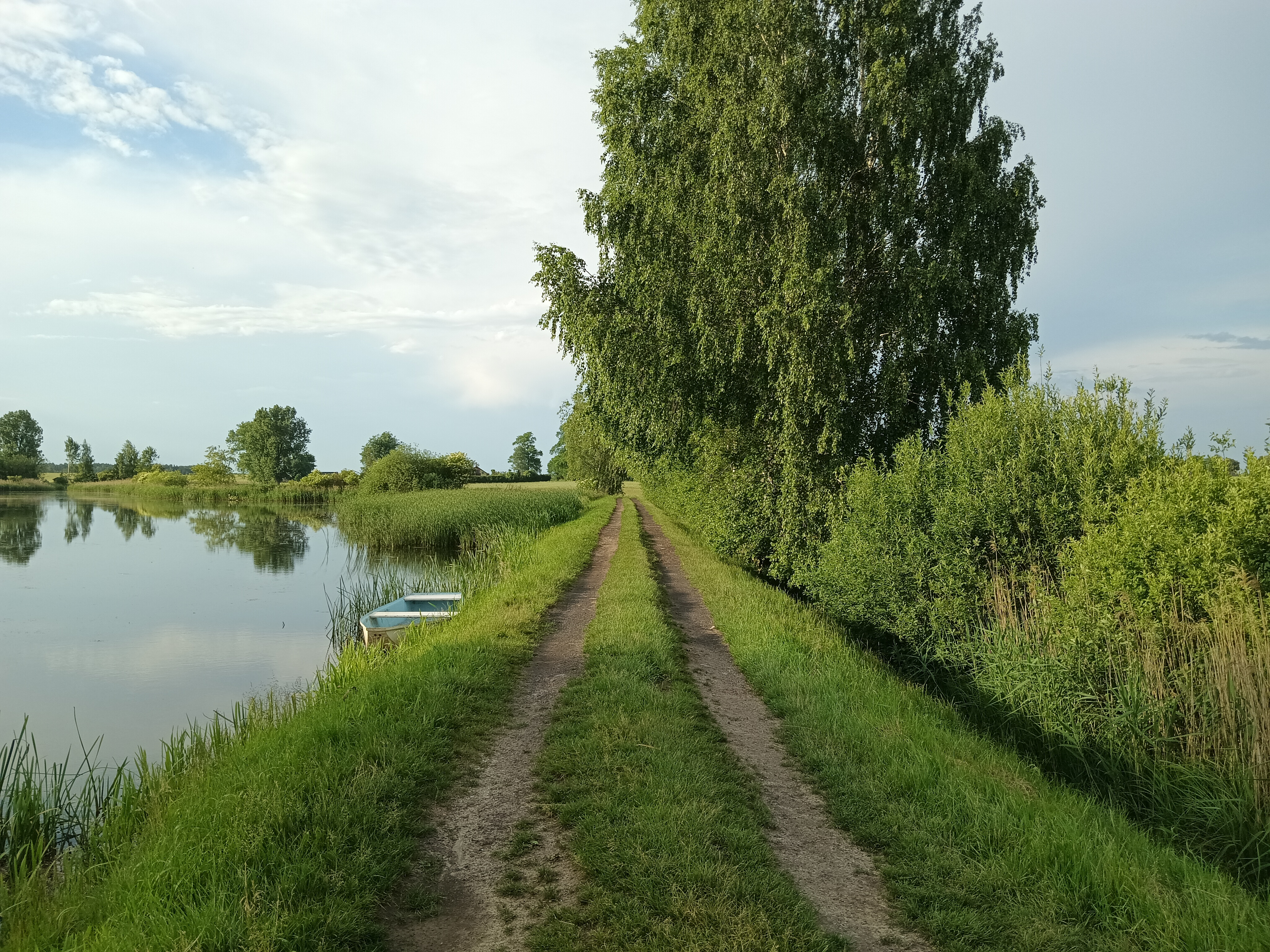
The cuseaway on one of the ponds

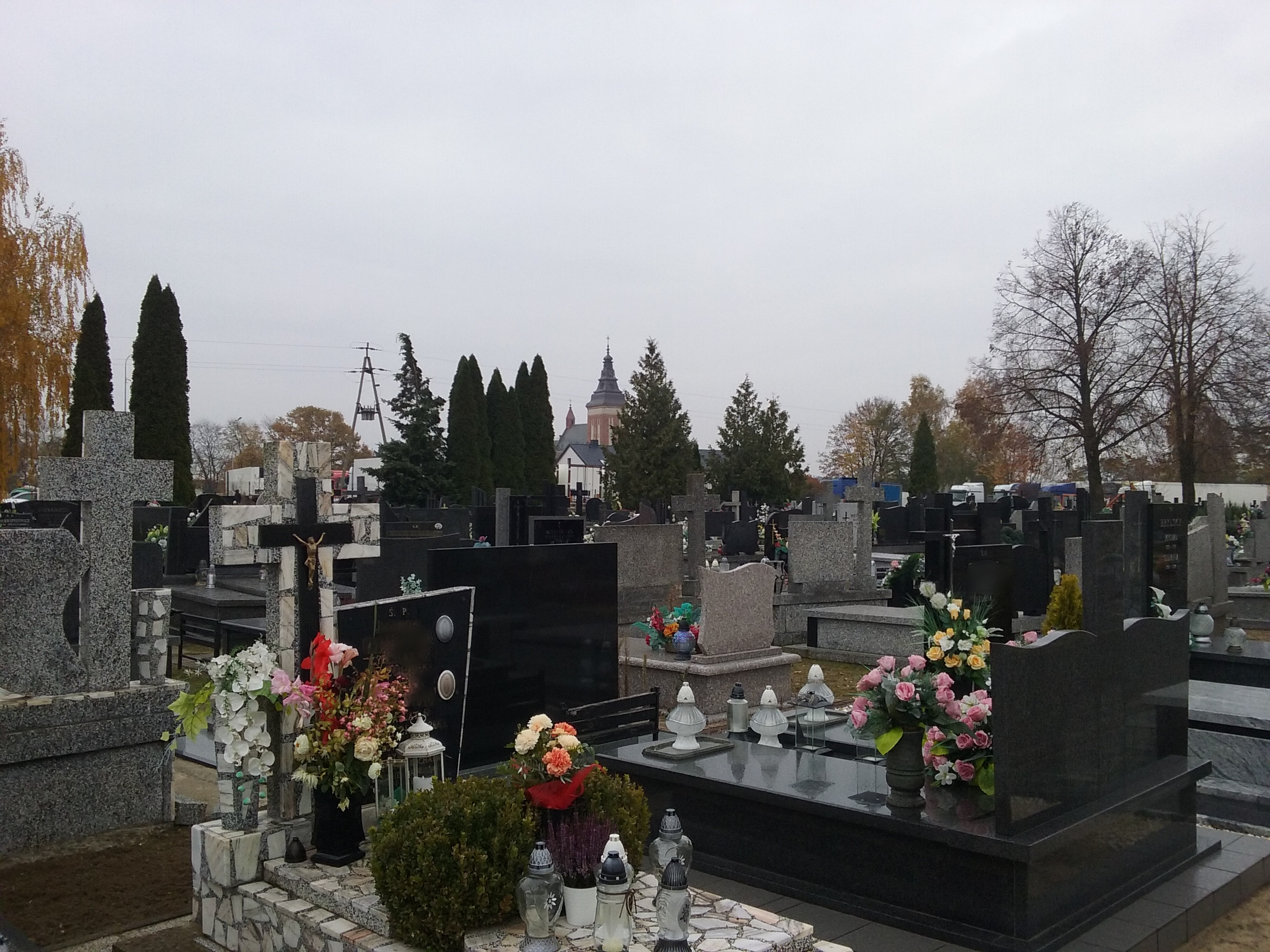
Part of the cemetery in the village

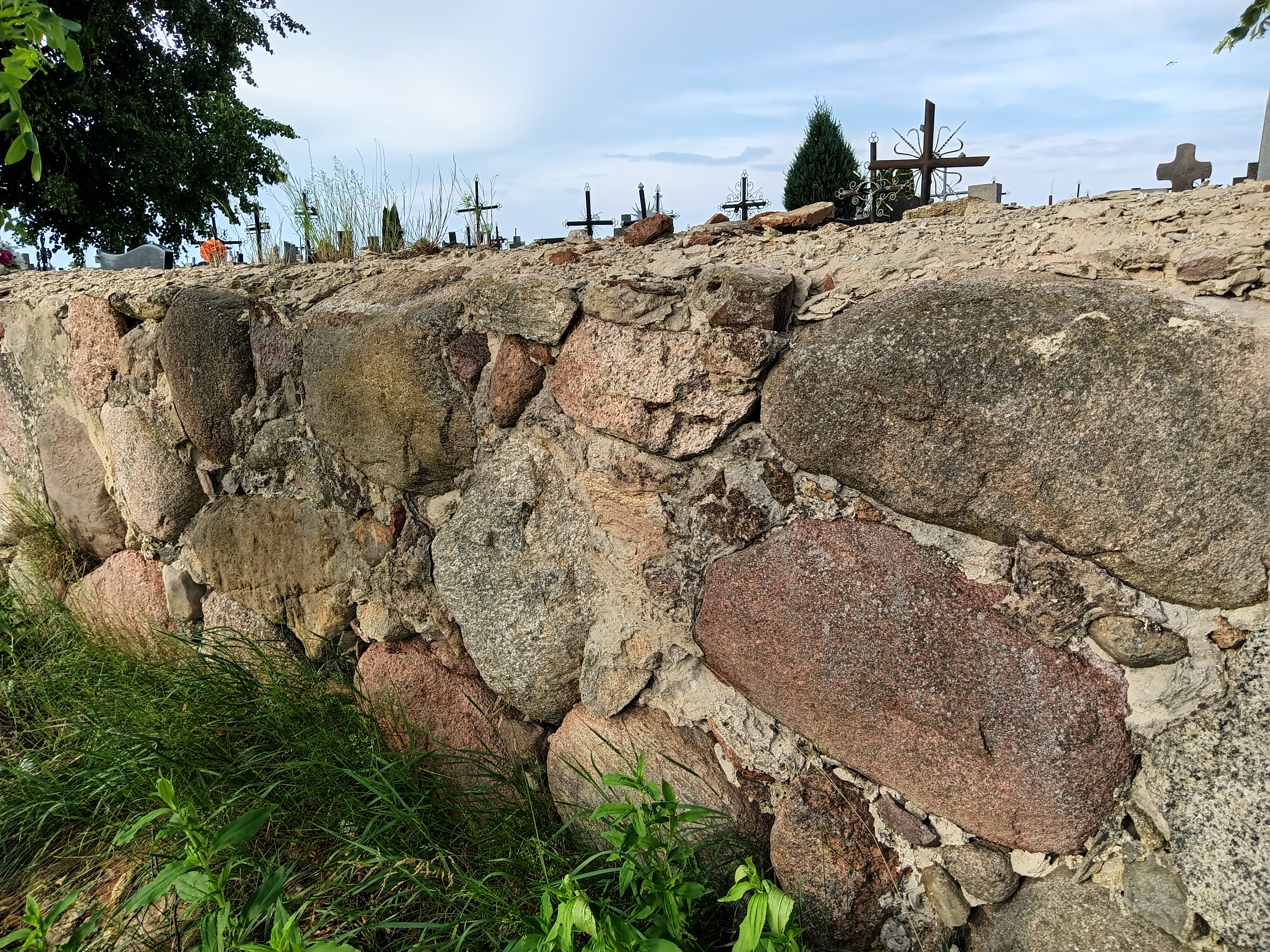
The structure of the cemetery wall

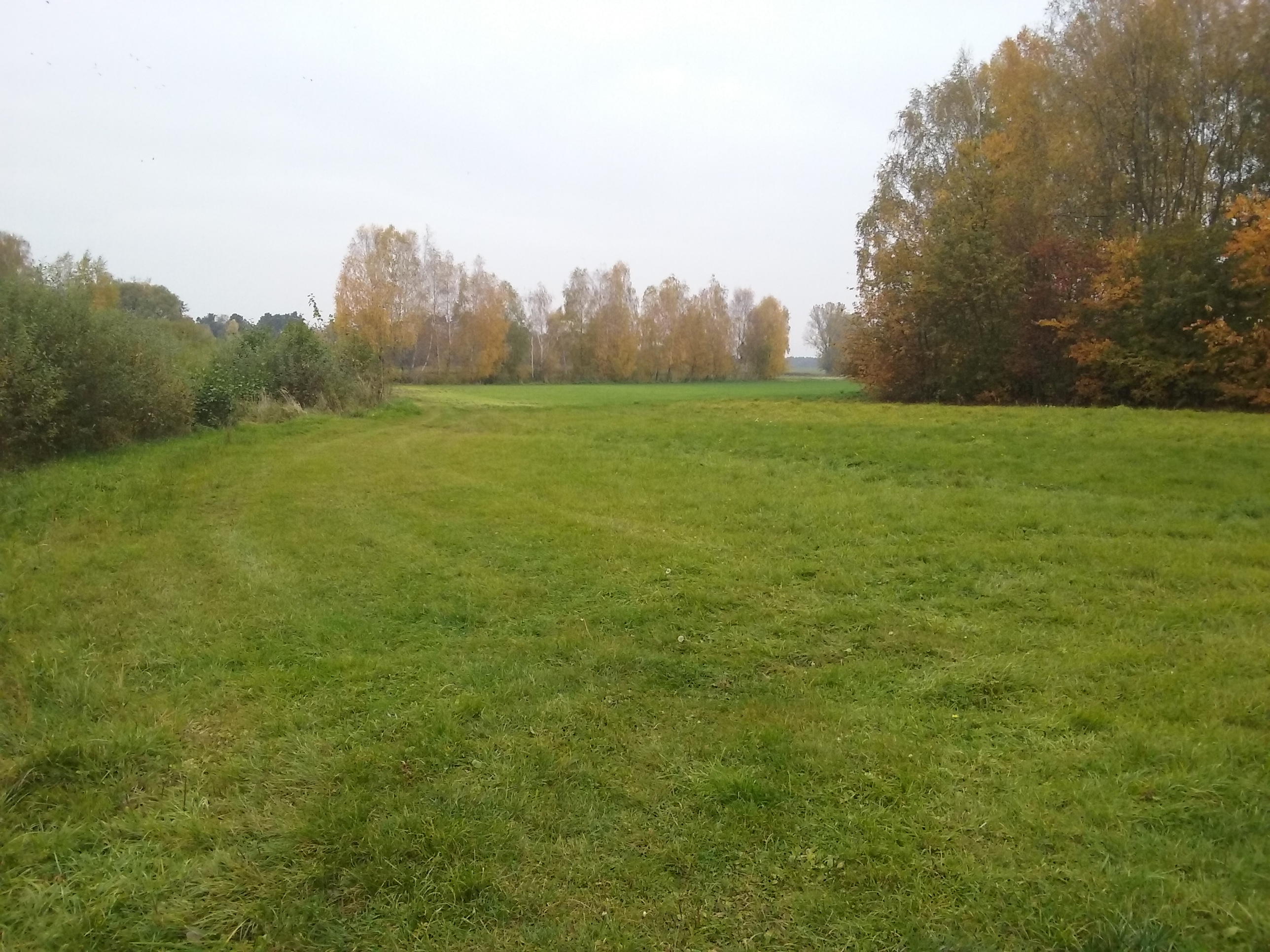
One of meadows in the village

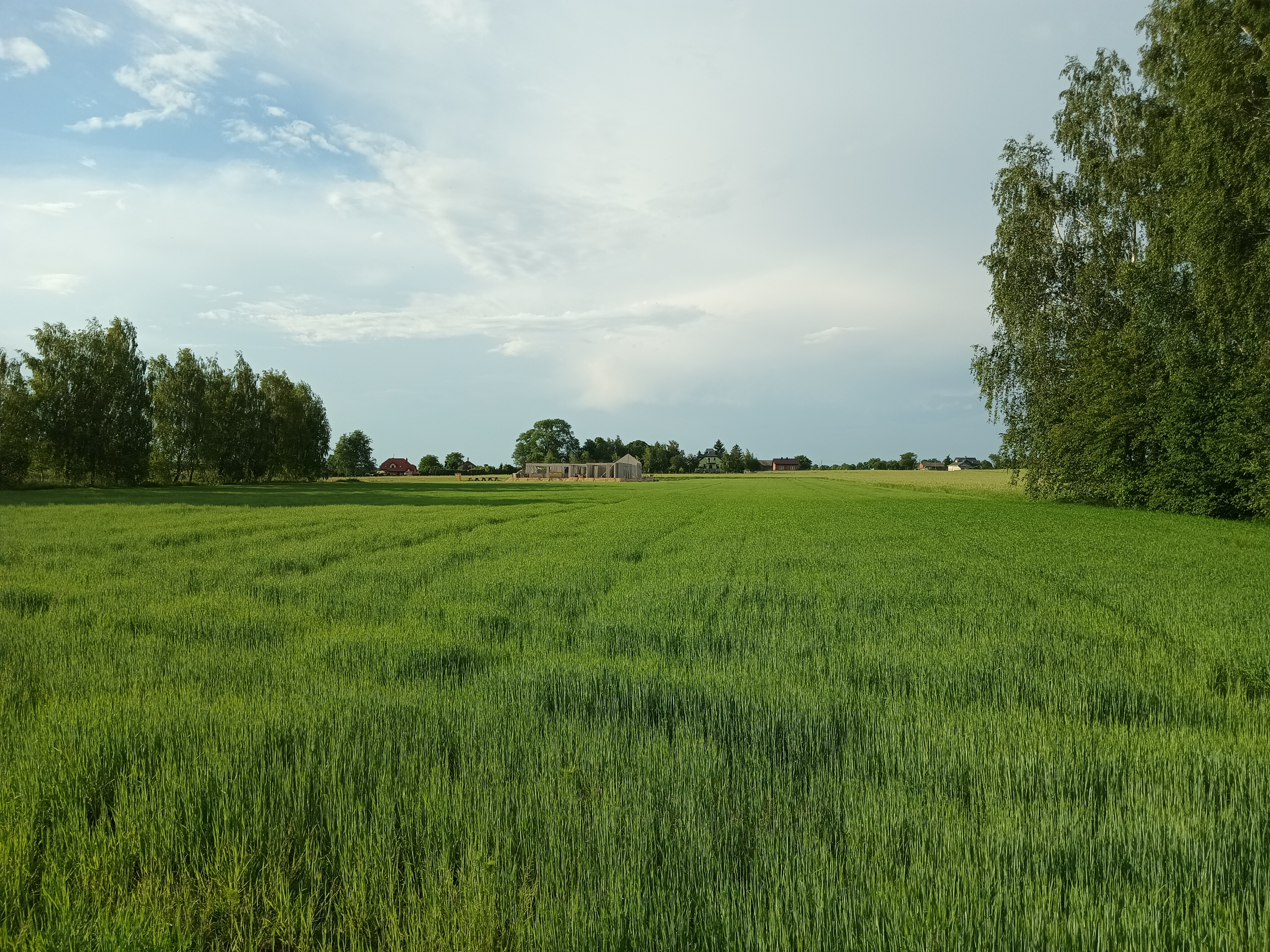
The western part of the village
