= Gmina Stanisławów =

Gmina Stanisławów Stanisławów Commune
- Gmina
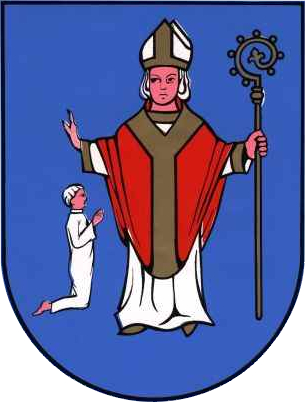
- Coat of arms
- Interactive map of Gmina Stanisławów
- Coordinates (Stanisławów): 52°17′N 21°33′E
- Country: Poland
- Voivodeship: Masovian
- County: Mińsk
- Seat: Stanisławów

Area
  - Total: 106.01 km^{2} (40.93 sq mi)

Population (2013)
  - Total: 6,640
  - Density: 62.6/km^{2} (162/sq mi)
- Website: http://www.stanislawow.ug.gov.pl

Gmina Stanisławów is a rural gmina (administrative district) in Mińsk County, Masovian Voivodeship, in east-central Poland. Its seat is the village of Stanisławów, which lies approximately 12 kilometres (7 mi) north of Mińsk Mazowiecki and 39 km (24 mi) east of Warsaw.

The gmina covers an area of 106.01 square kilometres (40.9 sq mi), and as of 2006 its total population is 6,240 (6,640 in 2013).

== Villages ==
Gmina Stanisławów contains the villages and settlements of Borek Czarniński, Choiny, Ciopan, Cisówka, Czarna, Goździówka, Kolonie Stanisławów, Ładzyń, Legacz, Łęka, Lubomin, Mały Stanisławów, Ołdakowizna, Papiernia, Porąb, Prądzewo, Pustelnik, Retków, Rządza, Sokóle, Stanisławów, Suchowizna, Szymankowszczyzna, Wólka Czarnińska, Wólka Piecząca, Wólka Wybraniecka, Wólka-Konstancja, Zalesie and Zawiesiuchy.

== Neighbouring gminas ==
Gmina Stanisławów is bordered by the town of Zielonka and by the gminas of Dębe Wielkie, Dobre, Jakubów, Mińsk Mazowiecki, Poświętne and Strachówka.
