= Konstan =

Konstan is a surname. Notable people with the surname include:

- David Konstan (1940–2024), American historian
- Joseph A. Konstan, American computer scientist
