= Pustelnik, Mińsk County =

Pustelnik
- Village
- Location within Poland
- Coordinates: 52°17′N 21°28′E
- Country: Poland
- Voivodeship: Masovian
- County: Mińsk
- Gmina: Stanisławów
- Population: 596

Pustelnik [pusˈtɛlɲik] is a village in the administrative district of Gmina Stanisławów, within Mińsk County, Masovian Voivodeship, in east-central Poland.
