= Retków, Masovian Voivodeship =

Retków
- Village
- Location within Poland
- Coordinates: 52°18′N 21°31′E
- Country: Poland
- Voivodeship: Masovian
- County: Mińsk
- Gmina: Stanisławów
- Population: 216

Retków [ˈrɛtkuf] is a village in the administrative district of Gmina Stanisławów, within Mińsk County, Masovian Voivodeship, in east-central Poland.
