= Wólka-Konstancja =

Wólka Konstancja
- Village
- Location within Poland
- Coordinates: 52°14′54″N 21°30′28″E
- Country: Poland
- Voivodeship: Masovian
- County: Mińsk
- Gmina: Stanisławów
- Population: 74

Wólka-Konstancja [ˈvulka kɔnsˈtant͡sja] is a village in the administrative district of Gmina Stanisławów, within Mińsk County, Masovian Voivodeship, in east-central Poland.
