= Konstancja Benisławska =

Polish poet and writer

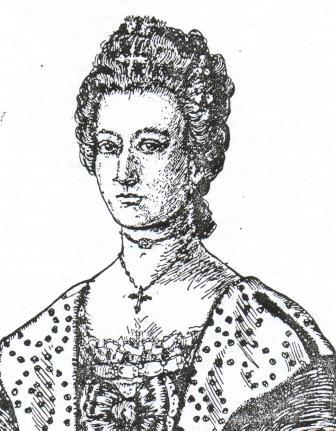
Konstancja Benisławska

Konstancja Benisławska (1747–1806) was a Polish poet and writer of religious hymns.
