= Paulinów, Łódź Voivodeship =

Paulinów
- Village
- Location within Poland
- Coordinates: 51°40′32″N 20°9′4″E
- Country: Poland
- Voivodeship: Łódź
- County: Tomaszów
- Gmina: Czerniewice
- Population: 50

Paulinów [pau̯ˈlinuf] is a village in the administrative district of Gmina Czerniewice, within Tomaszów County, Łódź Voivodeship, in central Poland.
