= Dzięcioły Bliższe =

- Village
- Location within Poland
- Coordinates: 52°35′36″N 22°17′31″E
- Country: Poland
- Voivodeship: Masovian
- County: Sokołów
- Gmina: Sterdyń
- Population (2021): 131

Dzięcioły Bliższe [d͡ʑɛnˈt͡ɕɔwɨ ˈbliʂʂɛ] is a village in the administrative district of Gmina Sterdyń, win Sokołów County, Masovian Voivodeship, in eastern Poland.
