= Kolonie Stanisławów =

- Village
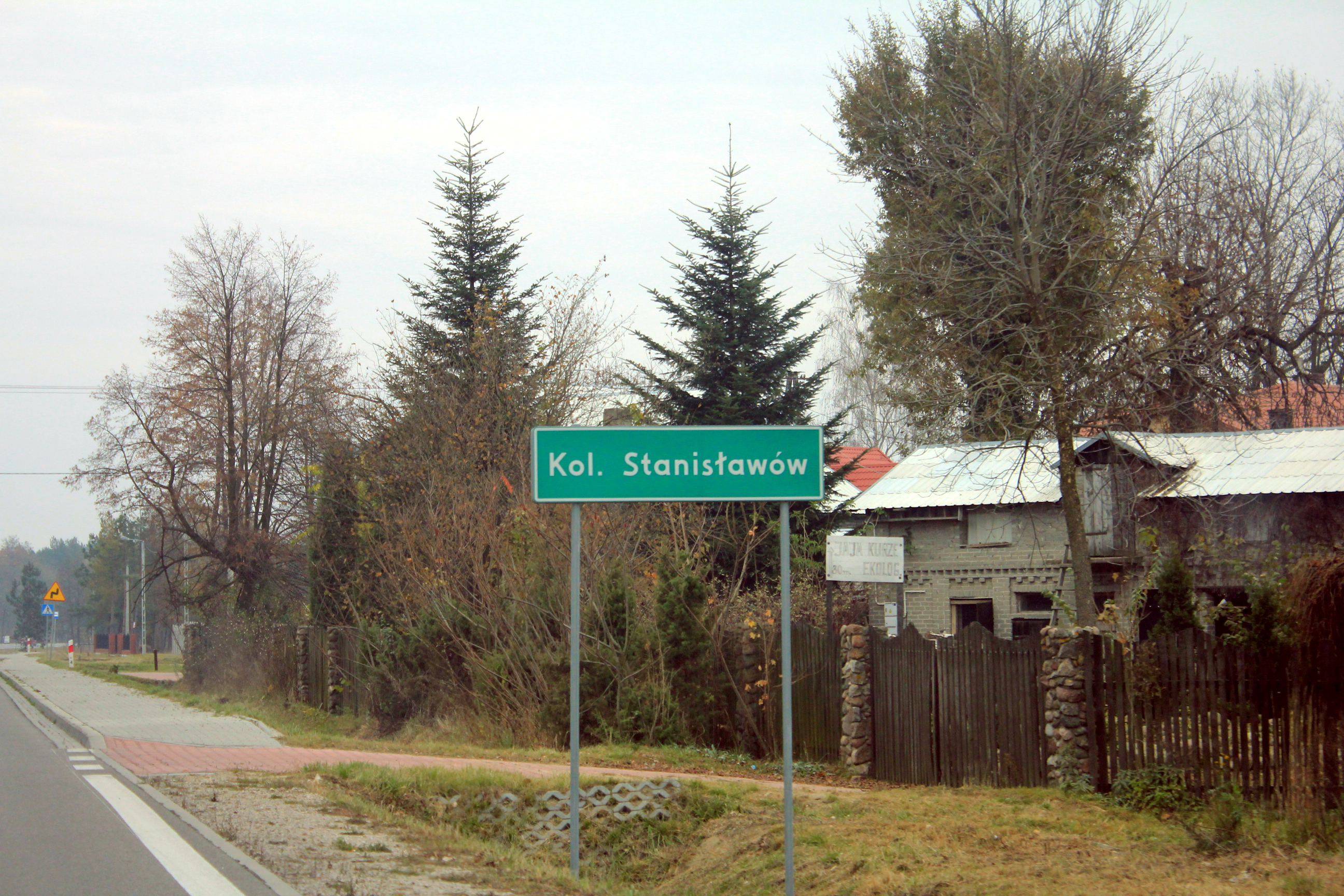

- Location within Poland
- Coordinates: 52°18′7.8″N 21°35′28.7″E
- Country: Poland
- Voivodeship: Masovian
- County: Mińsk
- Gmina: Stanisławów
- Population: 308

Kolonie Stanisławów [kɔˈlɔɲjɛ staniˈswavuf] is a village in the administrative district of Gmina Stanisławów, within Mińsk County, Masovian Voivodeship, in east-central Poland.
