= Jasień =

Jasień may refer to:

- Jasień, Kuyavian-Pomeranian Voivodeship (north-central Poland)
- Jasień, Lubusz Voivodeship (west Poland)
- Jasień, Pomeranian Voivodeship (north Poland)
- Jasień, Gdańsk (north Poland)
- Jasień, Brzeziny County in Łódź Voivodeship (central Poland)
- Jasień, Radomsko County in Łódź Voivodeship (central Poland)
- Jasień, Skierniewice County in Łódź Voivodeship (central Poland)
- Jasień, Gmina Lubochnia, Tomaszów County in Łódź Voivodeship (central Poland)
- Jasień, Wieluń County in Łódź Voivodeship (central Poland)
- Jasień, Lesser Poland Voivodeship (south Poland)
- Jasień, Gmina Chmielnik in Świętokrzyskie Voivodeship (south-central Poland)
- Jasień, Gmina Łopuszno in Świętokrzyskie Voivodeship (south-central Poland)
- Jasień, Staszów County in Świętokrzyskie Voivodeship (south-central Poland)
- Jasień, Masovian Voivodeship (east-central Poland)
- Jasień, Greater Poland Voivodeship (west-central Poland)
- Jasień (river), a river in the Polish city Łódź

== See also ==
- Gmina Jasień, urban-rural gmina in Żary County, Lubusz Voivodeship (western Poland)
- Nowy Jasień, village in Tomaszów County, Łódź Voivodeship (central Poland)
- Jasienna
- Jaÿsinia
