= Glinnik =

Glinnik may refer to the following villages in Poland:

- Glinnik, Lublin Voivodeship (east Poland)
- Glinnik, Gmina Lubochnia, Tomaszów County in Łódź Voivodeship (central Poland)
- Glinnik, Gmina Głowno in Łódź Voivodeship (central Poland)
- Glinnik, Gmina Zgierz in Łódź Voivodeship (central Poland)
- Glinnik, Podlaskie Voivodeship (north-east Poland)

== See also ==
- Nowy Glinnik, Tomaszów County, Łódź Voivodeship
