= Michael Sinclair (British Army officer) =

British Army officer

- Born: 26 February 1918
- Died: 25 September 1944 (aged 26); Oflag IV-C, near Colditz, Nazi Germany
- Relatives: Brother John Henry Lund Sinclair
- Military career
- Allegiance: (United Kingdom) British Empire
- Branch: British Army
- Rank: Lieutenant
- Nickname: Red Fox
- Service number: 75265
- Unit: 2nd Battalion Kings Royal Rifle Corps
- Conflicts: World War II: French and Low Countries campaign; Battle of France; Siege of Calais (POW); Stalag XXI-D; Oflag IV-C †
- Awards: DSO

Lieutenant Albert Michael Sinclair, DSO (26 February 1918 – 25 September 1944), known as the Red Fox, was a British prisoner at Colditz Castle (POW camp Oflag IV-C) during World War II. He was involved in a number of escape attempts and was recognised within the camp for his determination to escape. Sinclair was the only person to be killed while attempting to escape Colditz.

== Early life ==
Sinclair was born 26 February 1918 younger son of Colonel Thomas Charles Sinclair, CBE and of Iris Lucy Sinclair, née Lund.

Educated at Winchester College, he played for the college cricket XI at Lord's. He went on to study History and Modern Languages at Trinity College, Cambridge. Later, this linguistic ability and knowledge was to prove invaluable.

== Early military career ==
Commissioned into the 2nd Battalion, The King's Royal Rifle Corps in July 1939, he was captured by German forces in northern France and sent to Stalag XXI-D (Poznań) POW camp in the north of Poland.

== Escape from Stalag XXI-D ==
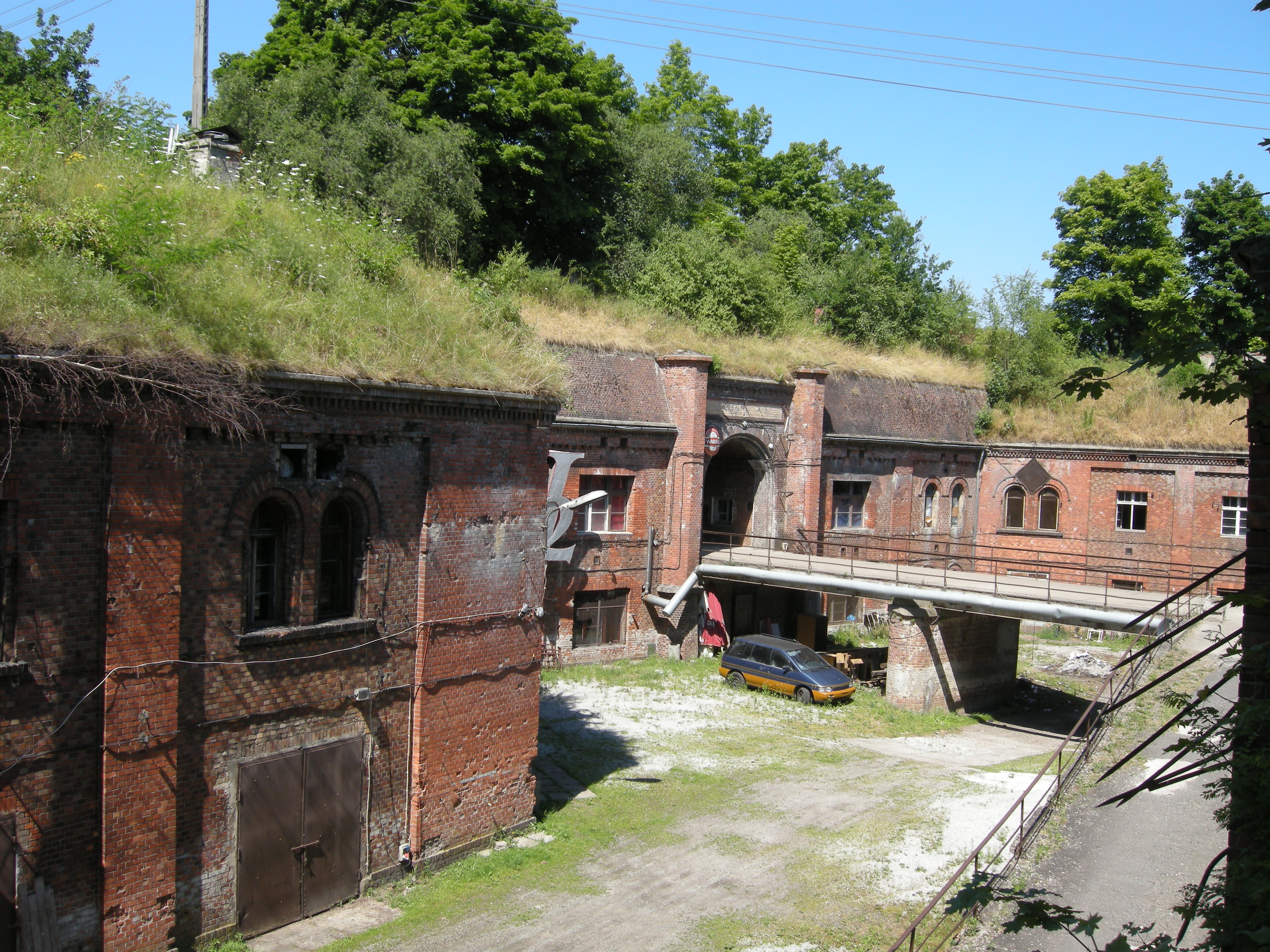
Fort VIII Stalag XXI-D from which Sinclair escaped in a handcart

On 28 May 1941, Sinclair escaped from Fort VIII, Stalag XXI-D, along with two comrades - fellow Wykehamist Gris Davies-Scourfield and the Etonian Ronnie Littledale - concealed in a modified handcart. They received assistance from Polish citizens and travelled through Łódź Kaliska, Lubochnia-Gorki to Tomaszów Mazowiecki with the intention of reaching Russia. Learning of the German invasion of the USSR. they changed their plans and walked to Warsaw, where they lived in hiding from 25 June to 26 August. Davies-Scourfield remained in Warsaw while Sinclair and Littledale travelled by train to Kraków and onward to Zakopane, alighting at the station before the main city. They walked across the Slovak border and were driven to Rožňava, where they caught the night train to Budapest. There they stayed for a month before travelling again by train to Yugoslavia through Szeged to Pančevo, then across the River Danube by ferry to Belgrade. On 11 November they took a train to Jagodina and five days later, took the Sofia train to Bela Palanka. From here they crossed the Yugoslav–Bulgarian frontier by horse-drawn cart. While walking to meet another cart they were stopped by a Bulgarian customs official who, on seeing their Yugoslav papers, took them into custody. They were handed over to the Bulgarian police in Pirot and moved from there to Sofia. Following interrogation, on 27 November, they were handed over to the German police. Moved from Sofia to Belgrade they were then moved to Vienna and held in the military prison from 2 December to 17 January 1942. They were then taken by train, escorted by one Feldwebel and a soldier in the direction of Dresden. Seizing an opportunity between Prague and Roudnice, both managed to escape from the moving train through a lavatory window. Unfortunately, Sinclair was spotted and having hurt his leg jumping from the train, was soon recaptured. Littledale avoided capture and eventually headed for Switzerland but was caught in Husinec on 29 May, while trying to avoid the police activity in and around Prague after the assassination of Reinhard Heydrich two days earlier. Both men were interviewed by the Gestapo before being sent to Colditz.

== Arrival at Colditz Castle and escape ==
Sinclair arrived in Colditz, along with Littledale, in July 1942 and almost immediately made an attempt to escape. He received a court martial charge for an offence allegedly committed in his prior POW camp. He was taken to Leipzig for trial but managed to make a getaway whilst in a lavatory at a Leipzig barracks. He was recaptured a few days later in Cologne, during a civilian hunt for RAF pilots believed to have been shot down over the city, during a bombing raid; his clothing, primarily of RAF origin, gave him away.

== "Franz Josef" escape ==
In April 1943, Dick Howe, the incumbent British Escape Officer, was approached by Sinclair, who had just been released from a long spell of solitary confinement for a previous escape attempt and his fellow POW, Monty Bissell, with perhaps one of the more audacious escape plans to emerge from within the walls of Colditz.

Howe had mused over the possibility of switching German guards with British imposters. His comments were not lost on Bissell, who quickly noticed the physical similarities between Sinclair and one of the German guard commanders, Stabsfeldwebel (Sergeant Major) Fritz Rothenberger, who was better known to the prisoners and guards as "Franz Josef" for his strong resemblance to Franz Josef, the former Austrian Emperor.

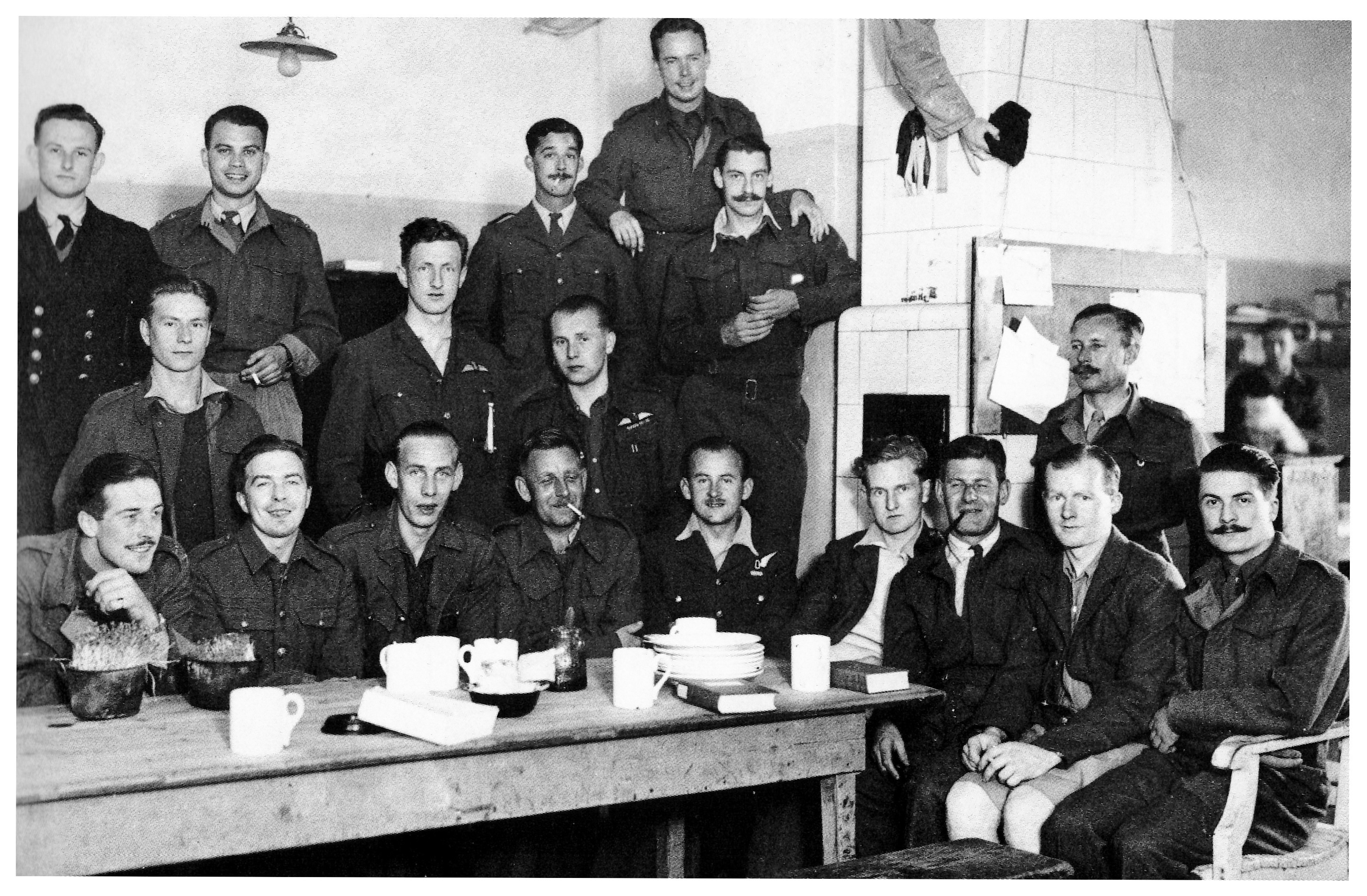
Sinclair in Colditz, seated with a mess, second from right

Rothenberger's duties included nightly inspections of the sentries on the eastern terrace of the castle, which overlooked a park area. This beat was one of the least popular amongst the German guards, as the narrow pathway abutted the walls of the castle and caused severe discomfort for the sentries who were required to watch the walls. It was from here that Sinclair and Bissell intended to escape.

They proposed to Howe that Sinclair, disguised as Rothenberger, along with two other prisoners disguised as German guards, climb through one of the sick bay windows overlooking the secluded terrace on the northern side of the castle and then descend to the sentry path via the steps leading down from the terrace. Then, he planned to proceed around the sentry path towards the catwalk and gate on the Eastern side of the castle, and alert the sentries on the way to an 'escape attempt' on the other side of the castle and order them to return to the guardroom. Once the guards on the path had been dismissed, he would then march to the gate and replace the two guards on duty with their British counterparts.

If successful, the British would have perhaps three and a half minutes, for as many men as possible to descend from the British quarters overlooking the eastern side of the Castle, via sheet ropes. These men would then pass through the gates guarded by the replacement guards in those three and a half minutes, before the real German guards returned to the guard house (with the real Rothenberger) discovered the ruse.

The escape attempt hinged on the ability of Sinclair to fool the German guards into believing he was the real Rothenberger. Already a fluent German speaker, he spent the next month, along with Teddy Barton and Alan Cheetham, studying his habits, mannerisms, gestures and accent. Whenever he entered the courtyard he was besieged by prisoners engaging him in idle conversation whilst observers noted every detail.

To take care of physical appearance, the services of Barton, who had honed his make-up skills in the camp theatre, were called upon and with Cheetham's assistance, manufactured no fewer than fourteen Rothenberger moustaches before they were happy with their work. Rex Harrison was given the task of producing three perfect German uniforms, whilst Major W. F. Anderson set to work to produce two imitation German rifles, two bayonets with scabbards, a revolver complete with holster made out of cardboard and boot polish, buttons, badges, medals and belt clasps.

The escape attempt took place on 19 May 1943 immediately after the 9.00 pm Appell (roll-call). Sinclair and his two "guards", John Hyde-Thomson and Lance Pope, both good German speakers descended from the window and made it down to the path. Tension built for the observing British prisoners as Sinclair relieved first one sentry and then another, their places taken by the British men.

The soldier guarding the gate refused to budge, remaining adamant that his orders were to stay put. Sinclair, faced with the choice of either persisting with the stubborn guard, or making a run for it with his two colleagues, decided to continue with the imposture. He became increasingly annoyed with the sentry and soon started yelling at him and it was not long before guards arrived from all over the camp, including the real Rothenberger.

Confusion ensued, with the German guards running around in panic and the NCOs unsure of the allegiance of the men under their command. Before long, a shot rang out and Sinclair sank to his knees, wounded. As the confusion began to subside, the prisoners were summoned to the courtyard for an Appell and the wounded Sinclair was left on the ground, unattended, for nearly 10 minutes. This caused much anger and resentment within the prisoner contingent, with many believing Sinclair had been killed.

Finally, at the Appell, Oberst Pravitt, the camp Commandant, announced "Lieutenant Sinclair is wounded but out of danger".

Howe later lamented his decision to not give Sinclair any specific order to quit if the plan went awry:

To be quite candid I've taken the can back for it. I left the final decision to Mike himself instead of giving him a specific instruction to quit at the slightest sign of obstruction. What some chaps argued afterwards was that, knowing Mike, I should also have known that he just wasn't the type who would quit and I should, therefore, have given him an order.

— Dick Howe,

== Final escape ==
Sinclair had always focused on escape but in 1944, as it became obvious that Germany would lose the war, he obsessed over not being able to escape and fight again to erase the shame he felt for having been captured so early. Sinclair attempted to copy Pierre Mairesse-Lebrun's escape; climbing over the barbed wire and jumping over the wall at the end, on 25 September 1944. He climbed over the fencing, was hit over the head by the butt of a gun by the guard but continued running. The guards fired at him and a bullet hit his elbow, ricocheting off and penetrating his heart, killing him. He was the only prisoner to be killed during an escape attempt at Colditz.

Sinclair's death was one of two events explicitly excluded from the document attesting to the prisoners' good care that they signed in April 1945, but others had noticed his deep melancholy and believed that the recklessness of the escape was intentional. The Germans buried Sinclair in Colditz Civil Cemetery with full military honours, his coffin was draped with a Union Flag made by the German guards and he received a seven-gun salute. In 1947 his grave was concentrated to the Berlin 1939–1945 War Cemetery. For his "relentless devotion to escaping whilst a POW" he was posthumously awarded the Distinguished Service Order after the war, the only lieutenant to be awarded the medal during World War II for an action in captivity.
