= Albertów =

Albertów may refer to the following places:

- Albertów, Pabianice County in Łódź Voivodeship (central Poland)
- Albertów, Gmina Lubochnia in Łódź Voivodeship (central Poland)
- Albertów, Gmina Rokiciny in Łódź Voivodeship (central Poland)
- Albertów, Lublin Voivodeship (east Poland)
- Albertów, Greater Poland Voivodeship (west-central Poland)
- Albertów, Silesian Voivodeship (south Poland)
