= Kierz =

Kierz may refer to the following places:

- Kierz, Kuyavian-Pomeranian Voivodeship (north-central Poland)
- Kierz, Łódź Voivodeship (central Poland)
- Kierz, Lublin Voivodeship (east Poland)
- Kierz, Masovian Voivodeship (east-central Poland)
- Kierz, Warmian-Masurian Voivodeship (north Poland)
