= Kruszewiec =

Kruszewiec may refer to the following places:

- Kruszewiec, Opoczno County in Łódź Voivodeship (central Poland)
- Kruszewiec, Gmina Lubochnia, Tomaszów County in Łódź Voivodeship (central Poland)
- Kruszewiec, Warmian-Masurian Voivodeship (north Poland)
