= Henry Davies (jockey) =

Welsh cricketer

Personal information
- Full name: Henry Gwyn Davies-Scourfield
- Born: 2 February 1865; Pembroke, Pembrokeshire, Wales
- Died: 4 December 1934 (aged 69); Patching, Sussex, England
- Batting: Right-handed

Domestic team information
- Years: Team
- 1883: Hampshire

Career statistics
Competition	First-class
Matches	1
Runs scored	45
Batting average	22.50
100s/50s	–/–
Top score	42
Catches/stumpings	–/–
- Source: Cricinfo, 8 January 2010

Henry Gwyn Davies-Scourfield (2 February 1865 — 4 December 1934), born Henry Gwyn Saunders Davies, was a Welsh horse racing jockey and first-class cricketer.

== Early life and cricket ==
The son of Arthur Henry Saunders Davies, he was born in Pembroke in January 1865. He was educated at Winchester College, where he played for the college cricket team. He played first-class cricket for Hampshire in 1883, making one appearance against Sussex at Hove. Batting twice in the match, he top-scored in Hampshire's first innings with 42 runs, before being dismissed by John Juniper, and in their second innings he was dismissed for 3 runs by C. Aubrey Smith.

== Horse racing and later life ==
It was as a horse racing jockey that Davies was better known. In 1882, Davies had his first competitive ride in the Lawrenny Hunt Cup, while the following year he rode his first winner, Jane Shore, in the Tivyside Hunt steeplechase meeting. He twice rode a horse to fourth place in the Grand National's of 1897 and 1900, and won the Welsh Grand National on Cloister in 1896. He was considered one of the best amateur jockey's of his time, he headed the list of winning jockey's under National Hunt rules a number of times. Davies rode 322 winners across his racing career, from 1,068 mounts that he entered on. He was also a race horse trainer, an occupation outside of being a jockey which he undertook between 1888 and 1928, firstly from Weyhill in Hampshire, later relocating to Patching in Sussex.

Davies retired in 1928 and died at his home in Patching in December 1934; in March 1921, he changed his name to Henry Gwyn Davies-Scourfield. He was survived by his wife, Helen. His son was the soldier Gris Davies-Scourfield, who notably escaped from Stalag XXI-D and Colditz during the Second World War.
