= Rzekietka =

- Village
- Location within Poland
- Coordinates: 51°38′9″N 20°2′55″E
- Country: Poland
- Voivodeship: Łódź
- County: Tomaszów
- Gmina: Lubochnia

Rzekietka [ʐɛˈkʲɛtka] is a village in the administrative district of Gmina Lubochnia, within Tomaszów County, Łódź Voivodeship, in central Poland.
