= Kochanów, Gmina Lubochnia =

Kochanów
- Village
- Location within Poland
- Coordinates: 51°36′11″N 20°5′19″E
- Country: Poland
- Voivodeship: Łódź
- County: Tomaszów
- Gmina: Lubochnia

Kochanów [kɔˈxanuf] is a village in the administrative district of Gmina Lubochnia, within Tomaszów County, Łódź Voivodeship, in central Poland.
