= Gris Davies-Scourfield =

British Army officer (1918–2006)

- Born: 8 August 1918; Patching, Sussex
- Died: 20 November 2006 (aged 88); Medstead, Hampshire
- Military career
- Allegiance: (United Kingdom) British Empire
- Branch: British Army
- Service years: 1938–1973
- Rank: Brigadier
- Nickname: Gris
- Service number: 77674
- Unit: King's Royal Rifle Corps
- Commands: 1st Battalion, Rifle Brigade (The Prince Consort's Own); 3rd Green Jackets
- Conflicts: World War II: Defence of Calais
- Awards: MC, CBE, DL

Brigadier Edward Grismond Beaumont 'Gris' Davies-Scourfield CBE was a British Army officer who became a prisoner of war and escaped from Stalag XXI-D and Colditz Castle during the Second World War.

== Early life and education ==
Gris Davies-Scourfield was born in Patching, Sussex on 8 August 1918, the fourth son of Henry G. Davies-Scourfield by Helen Newton.

He was educated at Winchester College and Royal Military College, Sandhurst where he was awarded the King's Medal and the Anson Memorial Sword.

== Military career ==
He was commissioned as 2nd lieutenant in the 60th Rifles 25 August 1938.

=== Action and capture ===
He served in England until the outbreak of World War II where he was sent to France as a platoon commander participating in the defence of Calais. He was captured on 26 May 1940 having been wounded four times.

=== Prisoner of war ===
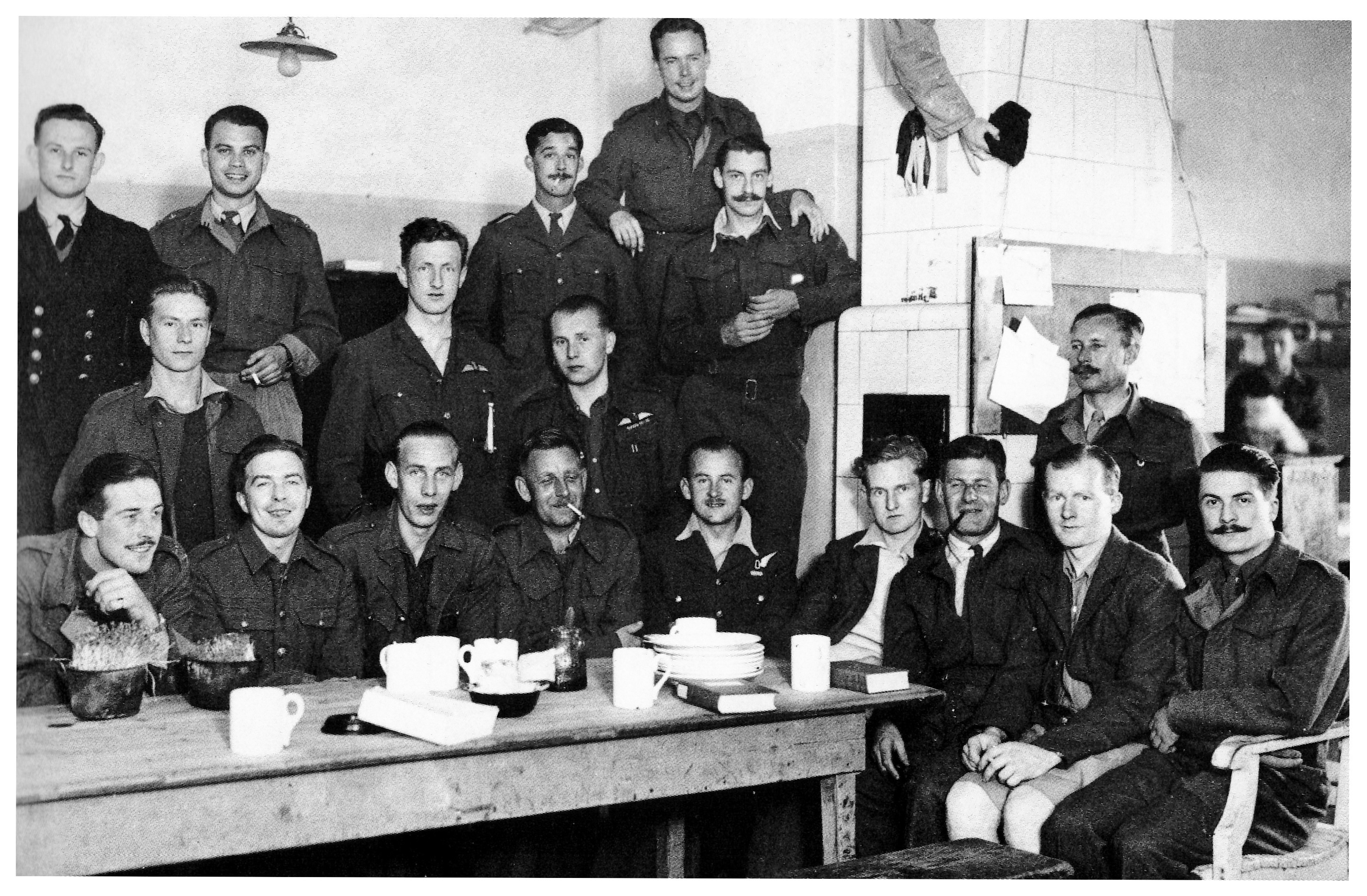
Davies-Scourfield in Colditz, seated with a mess, furthest right

As a prisoner of war he made several escape attempts.

Following capture he was moved between transit camps until reaching Oflag VII-C, Laufen. His first escape attempt was participation in digging a tunnel which was discovered and for which he received six weeks solitary confinement.

In February 1941 he was promoted to lieutenant.

He was sent to Fort VIII at Stalag XXI-D at Poznań. He escaped in May 1941 with two other British officers; Major Ronald Littledale and Lieutenant Mike Sinclair, by hiding in a modified handcart carrying rubbish to a pit outside the camp. They made contact with the Polish underground movement in Warsaw but, after the other two officers had moved on, Davies-Scourfield was recaptured in March 1942.

Davies-Scourfield was sent to Oflag IV-C at Colditz Castle and was rejoined by Littledale and Sinclair following their recapture months later.

In September 1943 he escaped, once again concealed in a handcart. For a few days his absent place in Colditz was taken by a 'ghost'. He was re-captured whilst attempting to reach the Netherlands following detection of a flaw in his forged papers. He was returned to Colditz where he remained until liberation by the Americans in April 1945.

=== Postwar ===
On return to England he learned of his award of the Military Cross for his action in Calais and mentions in despatches for his escape attempts and assistance in others. In late 1945 he married Diana Lilias Davidson in Sussex. Diana had served in the WRNS at Bletchley Park.

Gris' Military career continued, first in the War Office where his rank was substantiated to captain then, in 1947, Palestine during the final years of the British Mandate. He moved to the Staff College in 1948 during which time daughter Susan was born. Between 1949 and 1951 he worked for Military Intelligence in Malaya during the communist insurgency, during which he was promoted to major and for which he was appointed MBE.

From 1951 Gris served with the Rhine Army in Germany. Returning to England in 1955, he became second in command of the battalion in Winchester. In 1958 he returned for a period at the War Office, during which time son Gwyn was born in 1959.

1 July 1960 he was promoted to lieutenant colonel and until 1962 commanded 1st Battalion, The Rifle Brigade.

Posted to Cyprus in 1962, with a return to Winchester in 1963, where on 31 May 1963 he was promoted to colonel as brigade colonel of 3rd Green Jackets which he commanded until 1964. Following this, until 1966, he was commander of the British Joint Services Training Team in Ghana. On 31 December 1966 he was promoted to brigadier. He was appointed a CBE. In 1966 he was appointed Deputy Commander Near East Land Forces in Cyprus,. During this time he is credited with authorising and participating in the first Dhekelia H3 hash.

In 1969 he returned to England at Tidworth Camp where he was in command of the Salisbury Plain area until his retirement.

== Retirement and later life ==
In 1973 he retired to Medstead, Hampshire where he and his wife remained until shortly before Gris's death. He wrote his war memoirs, In Presence of My Foes: A Memoir of Calais, Colditz, and Wartime Escape Adventures, first published in 1991 and reprinted in 2004.

Both he and his wife, participated actively in local church and community life. Soon after retirement he became the Director of the National Association of Boys Clubs a post he held for 10 years. For some years he was Chairman of the Hampshire Branch of the Army Benevolent Fund. He was Chairman of the King's Royal Rifle Corps' Regimental Association and was appointed a Deputy Lieutenant for Hampshire.

Gris Davies-Scourfield died on 20 November 2006 in Alton. He was survived by his wife Diana, daughter, Susie and son, Gwyn. Diana died 15 August 2009.

== Bibliography ==
- Davies-Scourfield, Gris (1 November 2004). In the Presence of My Foes (2 ed.). Pen and Sword Books. p. 224. ISBN 978-1-84415-197-4.
