= Nowy Olszowiec =

- Village
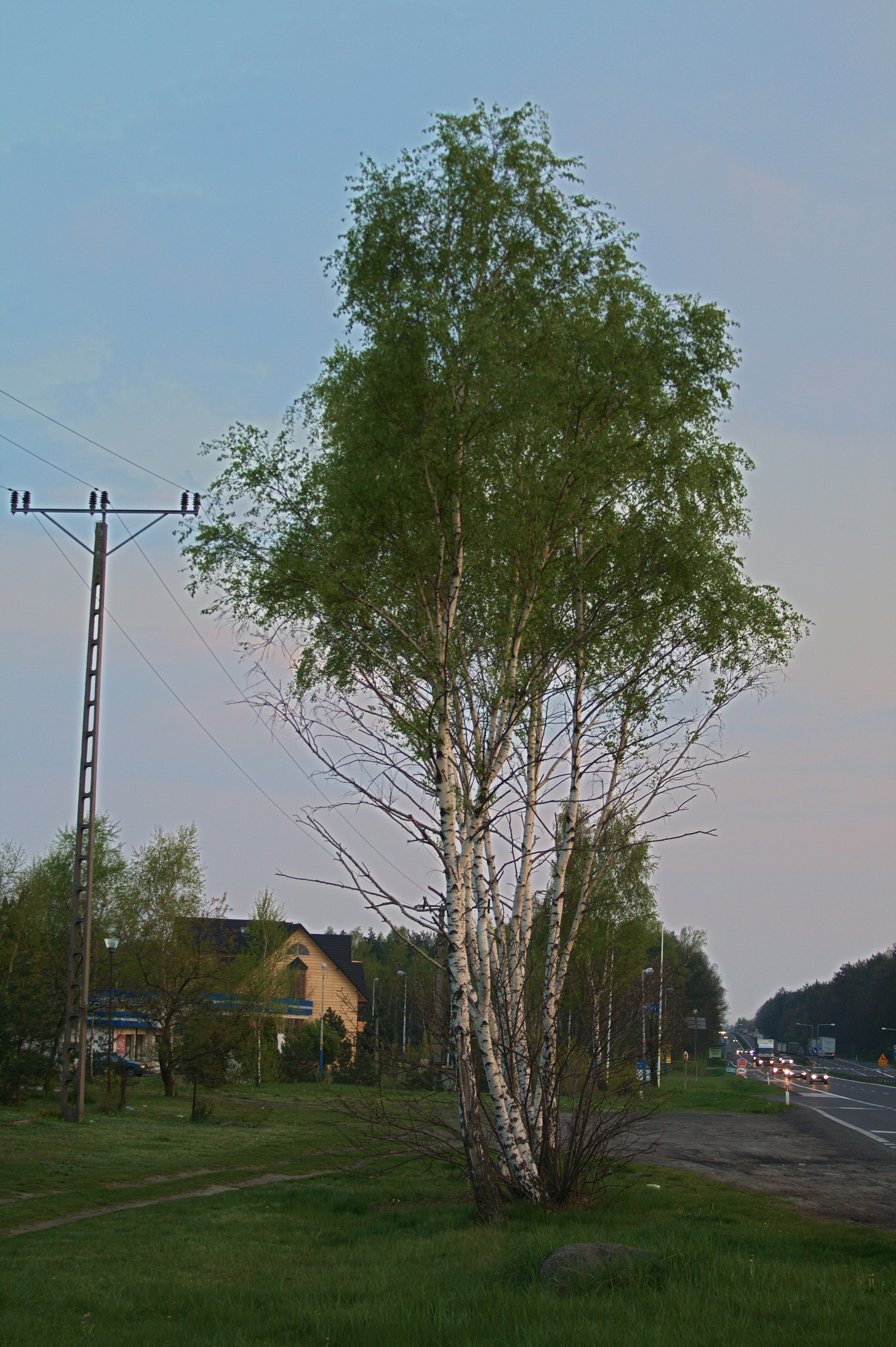

- Location within Poland
- Coordinates: 51°37′N 20°6′E
- Country: Poland
- Voivodeship: Łódź
- County: Tomaszów
- Gmina: Lubochnia

Nowy Olszowiec [ˈnɔvɨ ɔlˈʂɔvjɛt͡s] is a village in the administrative district of Gmina Lubochnia, within Tomaszów County, Łódź Voivodeship, in central Poland.
