= Luboszewy =

- Village
- Location within Poland
- Coordinates: 51°34′21″N 20°4′9″E
- Country: Poland
- Voivodeship: Łódź
- County: Tomaszów
- Gmina: Lubochnia

Luboszewy [lubɔˈʂɛvɨ] is a village in the administrative district of Gmina Lubochnia, within Tomaszów County, Łódź Voivodeship, in central Poland.
