= Ronald Littledale =

British Army officer (1902–1944)

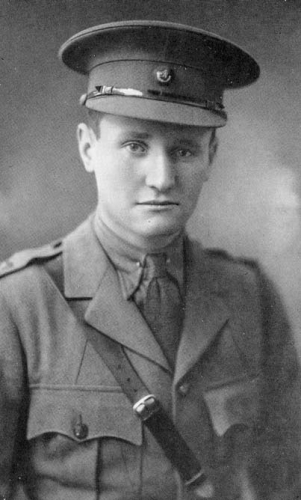
- Born: June 1902; Hartford, Cheshire, England
- Died: 1 September 1944 (aged 42); Airaines, Normandy, German-occupied France
- Military career
- Allegiance: United Kingdom
- Branch: British Army
- Service years: 1922−1944
- Rank: Lieutenant colonel
- Nickname: "Ronnie"
- Service number: 25378
- Unit: King's Royal Rifle Corps
- Commands: 2nd Battalion, King's Royal Rifle Corps
- Conflicts: Arab revolt in Palestine; World War II: Battle of France; Siege of Calais (POW); Western Allied invasion of France; Battle of Normandy †
- Awards: Distinguished Service Order

Lieutenant Colonel Ronald Bolton Littledale DSO (June 1902 – 1 September 1944) was a British Army officer who became a prisoner of war and successfully escaped from Colditz Castle during the Second World War but was killed in action on 1 September 1944.

== Early life ==
Ronald Littledale was born in June 1902 in Sandiway House, Hartford, Cheshire, England, the only son of Captain John Bolton Littledale and his wife, Clara Stevenson. He was educated at St. Aubyn's, Rotttingdean and then Eton College.

Littledale then attended the Royal Military College, Sandhurst and, after passing out from there, was commissioned as a second lieutenant into the King's Royal Rifle Corps (KRRC), a rifle regiment of the British Army, on 1 February 1923. He served with both the 1st and 2nd Battalions, KRRC in Germany with the British Army of the Rhine, India, Palestine and Northern Ireland, rising through the ranks during the 1920s and 1930s. He was promoted to lieutenant on 1 February 1925, and captain on 3 May 1936. From 8 September 1936 he was appointed as a staff captain with the 2nd Infantry Brigade, part of the 1st Infantry Division, which was then serving in Palestine during the Arab revolt. He relinquished this appointment on 9 December 1937.

== World War II ==
Littledale, promoted on 1 February 1940 to major, served in World War II where he took part in the defence of Calais, as a Transport Officer with the 30th Infantry Brigade. On 26 May 1940 he was captured by a German patrol near the fort at the harbour mouth.

=== Prisoner of War: Stalag XXI-D ===
With other captured officers he was marched across northern France for about 10 days then taken by train from near Luxembourg to Trier, Mainz and onward to Oflag VII-C Laufen in mid June 1940.

In March 1941 he was transferred to Stalag XXI-D, Poznań in Poland.

As a Prisoner of War he made several escape attempts. In May 1941, with two other British officers; Lieutenant Mike Sinclair and Gris Davies-Scourfield, he escaped by hiding in a modified handcart carrying rubbish to a pit outside the camp. They made contact with the Polish underground movement in Warsaw but, after parting company, Davies-Scourfield was recaptured in March 1942. Littledale and Sinclair were recaptured in Bulgaria after 8 months of freedom and handed back to the Germans.

=== Prisoner of War: Oflag IV-C, Colditz Castle ===
The three were all sent to Oflag IV-C at Colditz Castle, Littledale arriving there on 15 July 1942.

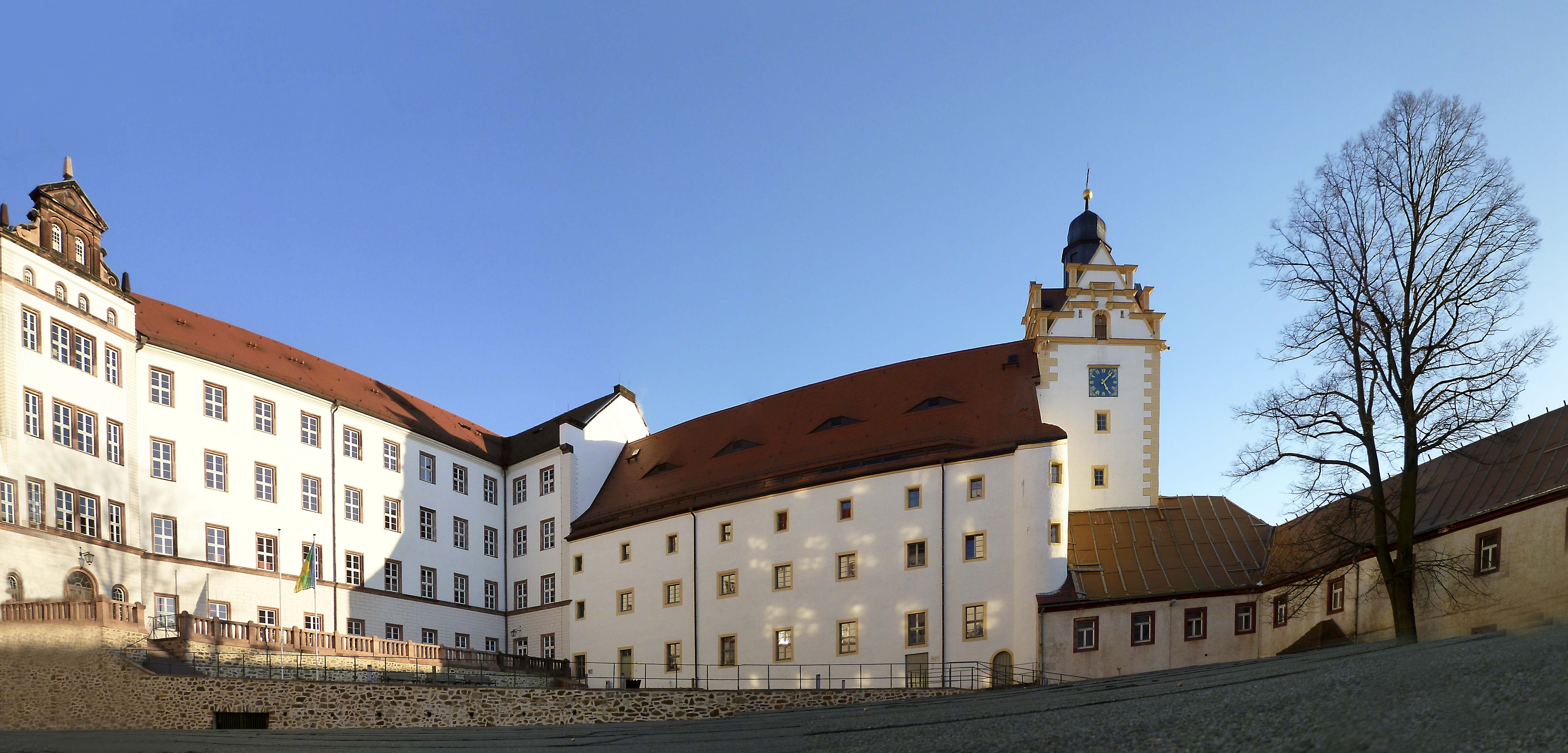
The German Kommandantur in 2011. This yard holds the cellar they escaped from

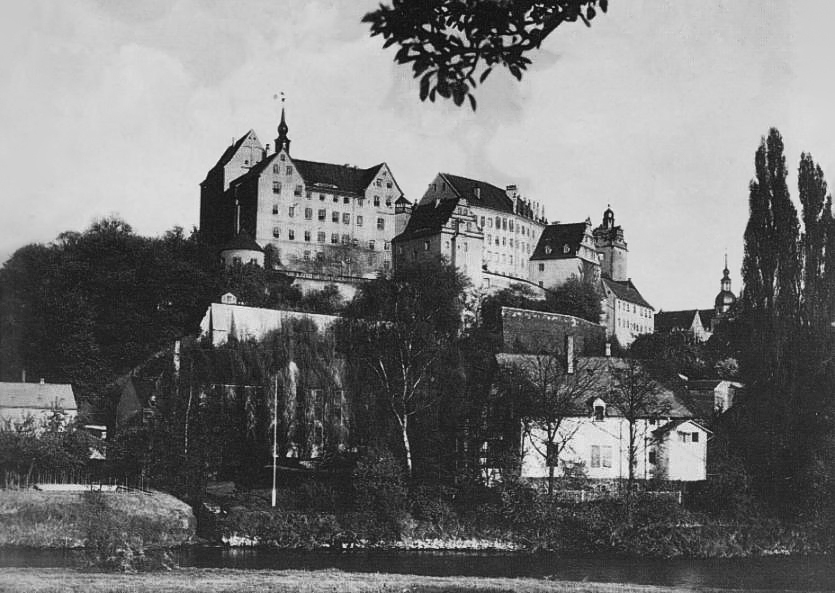
Colditz Castle (1945)

On 15 October 1942, together with Captain Pat Reid, Lieutenant Commander William E. Stephens RNVR, and Flight Lieutenant Howard D. Wardle, he escaped from Colditz, and travelling with Stephens arrived in neutral Switzerland on 20 October 1942.

Littledale left Switzerland on 25 January 1943, and with Flight Lieutenant Hedley Fowler, who had escaped earlier from Colditz, travelled across unoccupied France. They crossed into Spain on 30 January 1943, however they were arrested by the Spanish authorities later the same day.

They were taken to a military prison at Figueras, where they were held in filthy and cramped conditions until 22 February 1943. Then they were taken to the British Consul in Barcelona. From there they travelled to Gibraltar arriving on 25 March 1943.

=== Return and death ===
Littledale returned to the UK shortly afterwards.

For his escape and actions whilst in captivity he was awarded the Distinguished Service Order on 4 May 1943.

He was killed in action on 1 September 1944, commanding the 2nd Battalion of the King's Royal Rifle Corps and is buried at Airaines Cemetery in France.
