= Osiedle Nowy Glinnik =

- Village
- Location within Poland
- Coordinates: 51°34′N 20°4′E
- Country: Poland
- Voivodeship: Łódź
- County: Tomaszów
- Gmina: Lubochnia
- Population (approx.): 1,000

Osiedle Nowy Glinnik [ɔˈɕɛdlɛ ˈnɔvɨ ˈɡlinnik] is a village in the administrative district of Gmina Lubochnia, within Tomaszów County, Łódź Voivodeship, in central Poland.

The village has an approximate population of 998.
