= Dębniak, Gmina Lubochnia =

Dębniak
- Village
- Location within Poland
- Coordinates: 51°38′N 20°1′E
- Country: Poland
- Voivodeship: Łódź
- County: Tomaszów
- Gmina: Lubochnia

Dębniak [ˈdɛmbɲak] is a village in the administrative district of Gmina Lubochnia, within Tomaszów County, Łódź Voivodeship, in central Poland.
