= Czółna, Łódź Voivodeship =

Czółna
- Village
- Location within Poland
- Coordinates: 51°37′55″N 20°4′53″E
- Country: Poland
- Voivodeship: Łódź
- County: Tomaszów
- Gmina: Lubochnia

Czółna [ˈt͡ʂuu̯na] is a village in the administrative district of Gmina Lubochnia, within Tomaszów County, Łódź Voivodeship, in central Poland.
