= Cygan, Łódź Voivodeship =

Cygan
- Village
- Location within Poland
- Coordinates: 51°32′44″N 20°5′26″E
- Country: Poland
- Voivodeship: Łódź
- County: Tomaszów
- Gmina: Lubochnia

Cygan [ˈt͡sɨɡan] is a village in the administrative district of Gmina Lubochnia, within Tomaszów County, Łódź Voivodeship, in central Poland.
