= Brenica =

- Village
- Location within Poland
- Coordinates: 51°38′N 20°4′E
- Country: Poland
- Voivodeship: Łódź
- County: Tomaszów
- Gmina: Lubochnia

Brenica [brɛˈnit͡sa] is a village in the administrative district of Gmina Lubochnia, within Tomaszów County, Łódź Voivodeship, in central Poland.
