= Lubochnia, Łódź Voivodeship =

Lubochnia
- Village
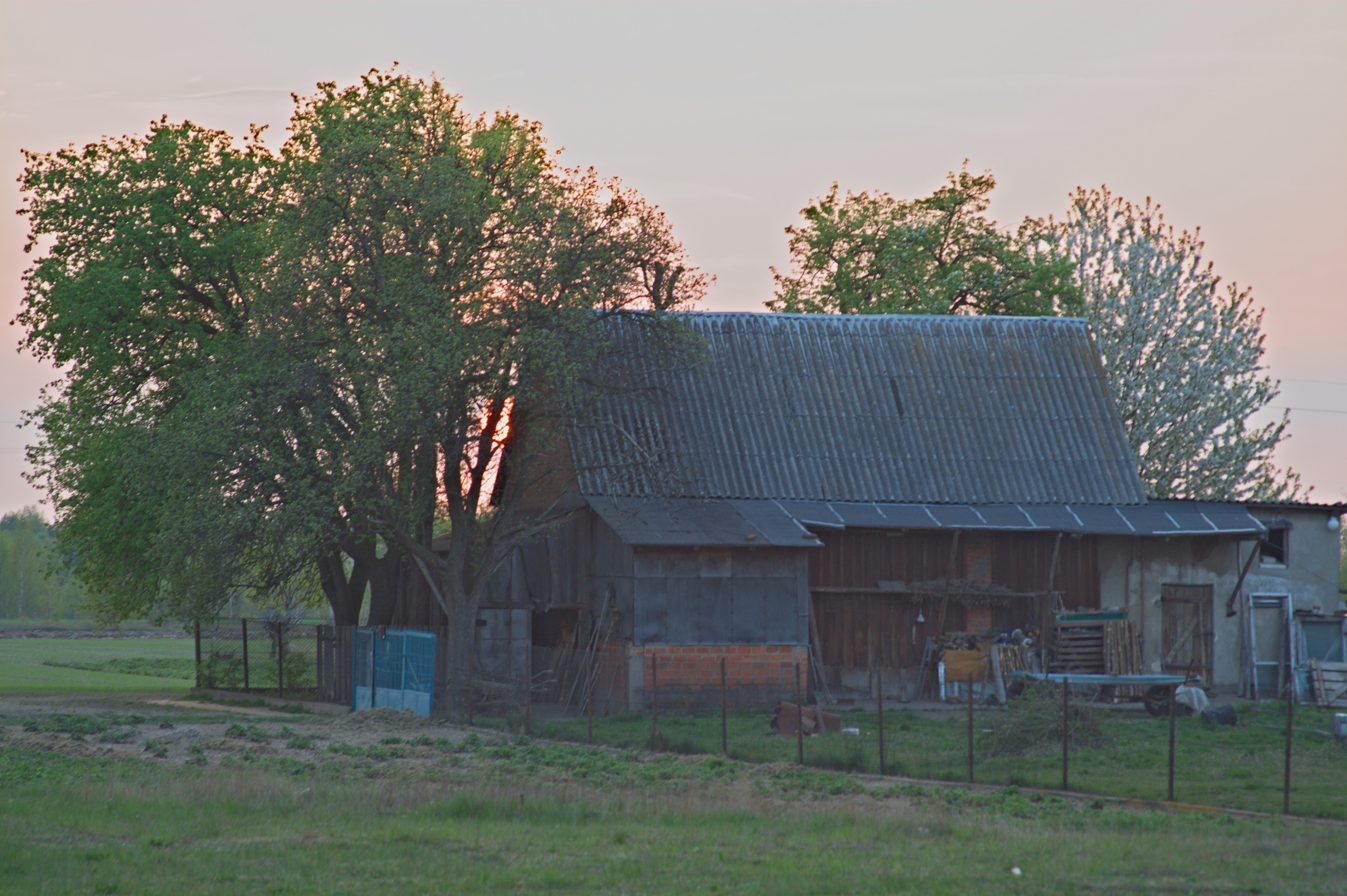

- Location within Poland
- Coordinates: 51°36′26″N 20°3′1″E
- Country: Poland
- Voivodeship: Łódź
- County: Tomaszów
- Gmina: Lubochnia
- Population: 684

Lubochnia [luˈbɔxɲa] is a village in Tomaszów County, Łódź Voivodeship, in central Poland. It is the seat of the gmina, the principal unit of administrative division in Poland, called Gmina Lubochnia.
