= Olszowiec, Gmina Lubochnia =

Olszowiec
- Village
- Location within Poland
- Coordinates: 51°36′N 20°5′E
- Country: Poland
- Voivodeship: Łódź
- County: Tomaszów
- Gmina: Lubochnia

Olszowiec [ɔlˈʂɔvjɛt͡s] is a village in the administrative district of Gmina Lubochnia, within Tomaszów County, Łódź Voivodeship, in central Poland.
