= Chrzemce =

- Village
- Location within Poland
- Coordinates: 51°34′31″N 20°2′25″E
- Country: Poland
- Voivodeship: Łódź
- County: Tomaszów
- Gmina: Lubochnia

Chrzemce [ˈxʂɛmt͡sɛ] is a village in the administrative district of Gmina Lubochnia, within Tomaszów County, Łódź Voivodeship, in central Poland.
