= Gmina Lubochnia =

Gmina Lubochnia Lubochnia Commune
- Gmina
- Flag Coat of arms
- Interactive map of Gmina Lubochnia
- Coordinates (Lubochnia): 51°36′26″N 20°3′1″E
- Country: Poland
- Voivodeship: Łódź
- County: Tomaszów
- Seat: Lubochnia

Area
  - Total: 131.55 km^{2} (50.79 sq mi)

Population (2006)
  - Total: 7,600
  - Density: 58/km^{2} (150/sq mi)
- Website: http://www.lubochnia.pl/

Gmina Lubochnia is a rural gmina (administrative district) in Tomaszów County, Łódź Voivodeship, in central Poland. Its seat is the village of Lubochnia, which lies approximately 11 kilometres (7 mi) north of Tomaszów Mazowiecki and 45 km (28 mi) south-east of the regional capital Łódź.

The gmina covers an area of 131.55 square kilometres (50.8 sq mi), and as of 2006 its total population is 7,600.

The gmina contains part of the protected area called Spała Landscape Park.

== Villages ==
Gmina Lubochnia contains the villages and settlements of Albertów, Brenica, Chrzemce, Cygan, Czółna, Dąbrowa, Dębniak, Emilianów, Glinnik, Henryków, Jasień, Kierz, Kochanów, Kruszewiec, Lubochenek, Lubochnia, Lubochnia Dworska, Lubochnia-Górki, Luboszewy, Małecz, Marianka, Nowy Glinnik, Nowy Jasień, Nowy Olszowiec, Olszowiec, Osiedle Nowy Glinnik, Rzekietka and Tarnowska Wola.

== Neighbouring gminas ==
Gmina Lubochnia is bordered by the town of Tomaszów Mazowiecki and by the gminas of Budziszewice, Czerniewice, Inowłódz, Tomaszów Mazowiecki, Ujazd and Żelechlinek.
