= Małecz =

- Village
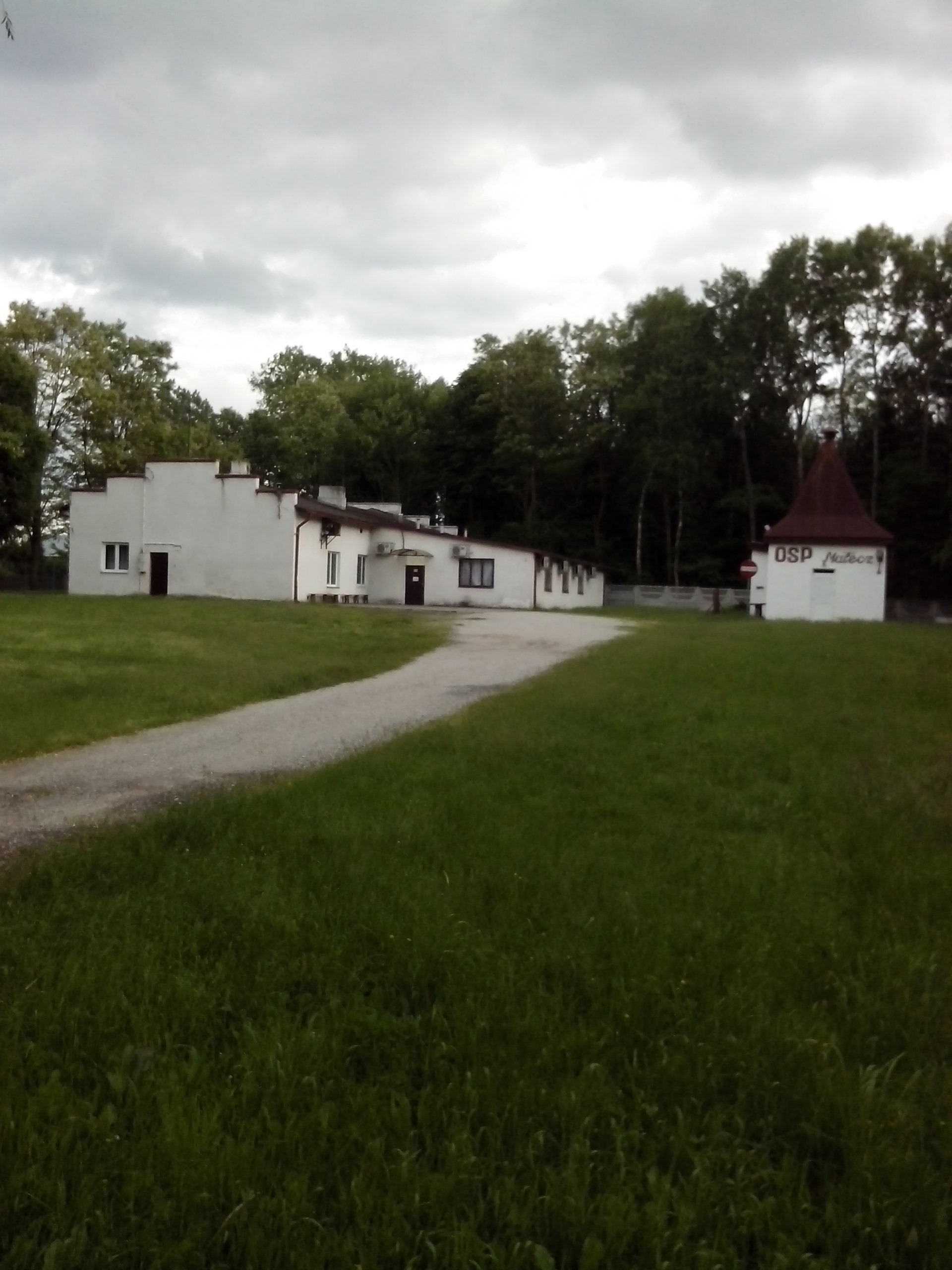

- Location within Poland
- Coordinates: 51°37′N 20°0′E
- Country: Poland
- Voivodeship: Łódź
- County: Tomaszów
- Gmina: Lubochnia
- Population: 490

Małecz [ˈmawɛt͡ʂ] is a village in the administrative district of Gmina Lubochnia, within Tomaszów County, Łódź Voivodeship, in central Poland.
