= Marianka, Gmina Lubochnia =

Marianka
- Village
- Location within Poland
- Coordinates: 51°33′55″N 20°4′46″E
- Country: Poland
- Voivodeship: Łódź
- County: Tomaszów
- Gmina: Lubochnia

Marianka [maˈrjaŋka] is a village in the administrative district of Gmina Lubochnia, within Tomaszów County, Łódź Voivodeship, in central Poland.
