= Tarnowska Wola, Łódź Voivodeship =

Tarnowska Wola
- Village
- Location within Poland
- Coordinates: 51°39′N 20°1′E
- Country: Poland
- Voivodeship: Łódź
- County: Tomaszów
- Gmina: Lubochnia

Tarnowska Wola [tarˈnɔfska ˈvɔla] is a village in the administrative district of Gmina Lubochnia, within Tomaszów County, Łódź Voivodeship, in central Poland.
