= Albertów, Gmina Lubochnia =

Albertów
- Village
- Location within Poland
- Coordinates: 51°35′46″N 20°06′22″E
- Country: Poland
- Voivodeship: Łódź
- County: Tomaszów
- Gmina: Lubochnia

Albertów [alˈbɛrtuf] is a village in the administrative district of Gmina Lubochnia, within Tomaszów County, Łódź Voivodeship, in central Poland.
