= Jasień (river) =

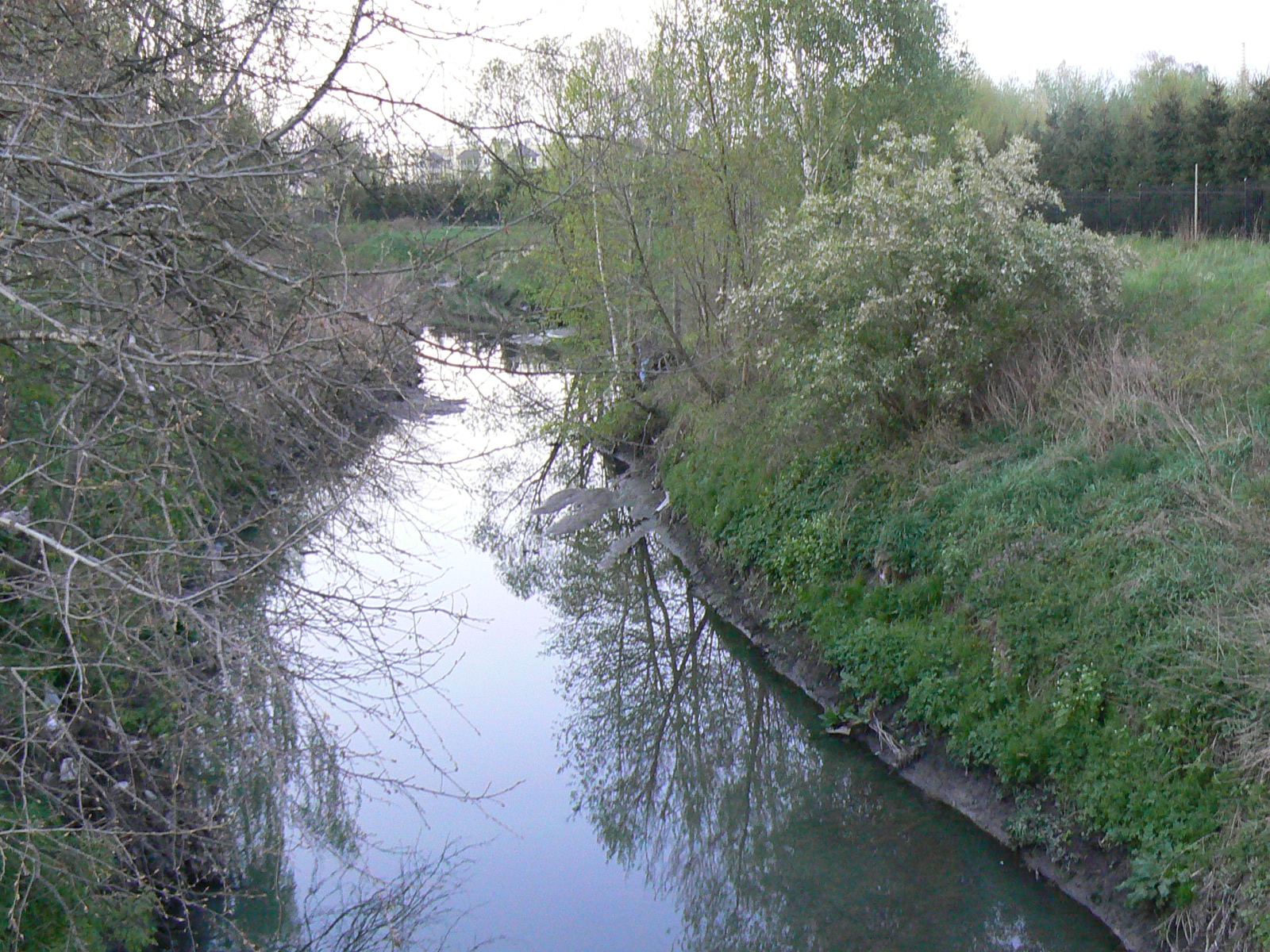

Location
- Country: Poland

Physical characteristics
- Source
  - location: Stoki district, Łódź
  - coordinates: 51.7742°N 19.5265°E
  - elevation: 245 m (804 feet)
- Mouth
  - location: Ner
  - coordinates: 51.7138°N 19.4129°E
- Length: 12.7 km (7.9 mi)

Basin features
- Progression: Ner→ Warta→ Oder→ Baltic Sea

The Jasień [ˈjaɕɛɲ] is a river flowing through the Polish city of Łódź that played a major role in the city's development as an industrial centre in the early nineteenth century. Sections of the river have been regulated and moved to underground canals, while several ponds remain scattered across the city's parks in what used to be the river's overground corridor. The Jasień is 12.7 km (7.9 miles) long, beginning its course in the hills of the Stoki district in the northeast of the city at an elevation of c. 245 metres above sea level, and flowing down towards the Ner river valley in the southwest.

== History ==
Like most other rivers and streams in Łódź, the Jasień was too narrow and shallow to enable water transportation, but its high stream gradient and significant flow rates made it amenable to being used as a source of hydropower. A number of mills were built on the river already in the late Middle Ages, more than on any other stream in the area, due to the fact that the river's gradient was comparable to that of mountain streams. These included the now non-existent Araszt mill in the village of Widzew; Wójtowski mill (Reeve’s Mill), whose medieval foundation has survived to this day beneath the nineteenth-century administrator's house in the grounds of what used to be Karl Scheibler’s farm; Księży Młyn (Priest's Mill), the largest of the town's mills in the eighteenth century, which burned down in 1822, later giving its name to one of the districts of the city; as well as Kulom mill, Rokicie mill and Chachuła mill. Of these three, only the mill in the village (now district) of Rokicie survives in the city's landscape, the current building of the steam-powered mill in Cieszyńska street dating back to the late nineteenth century.

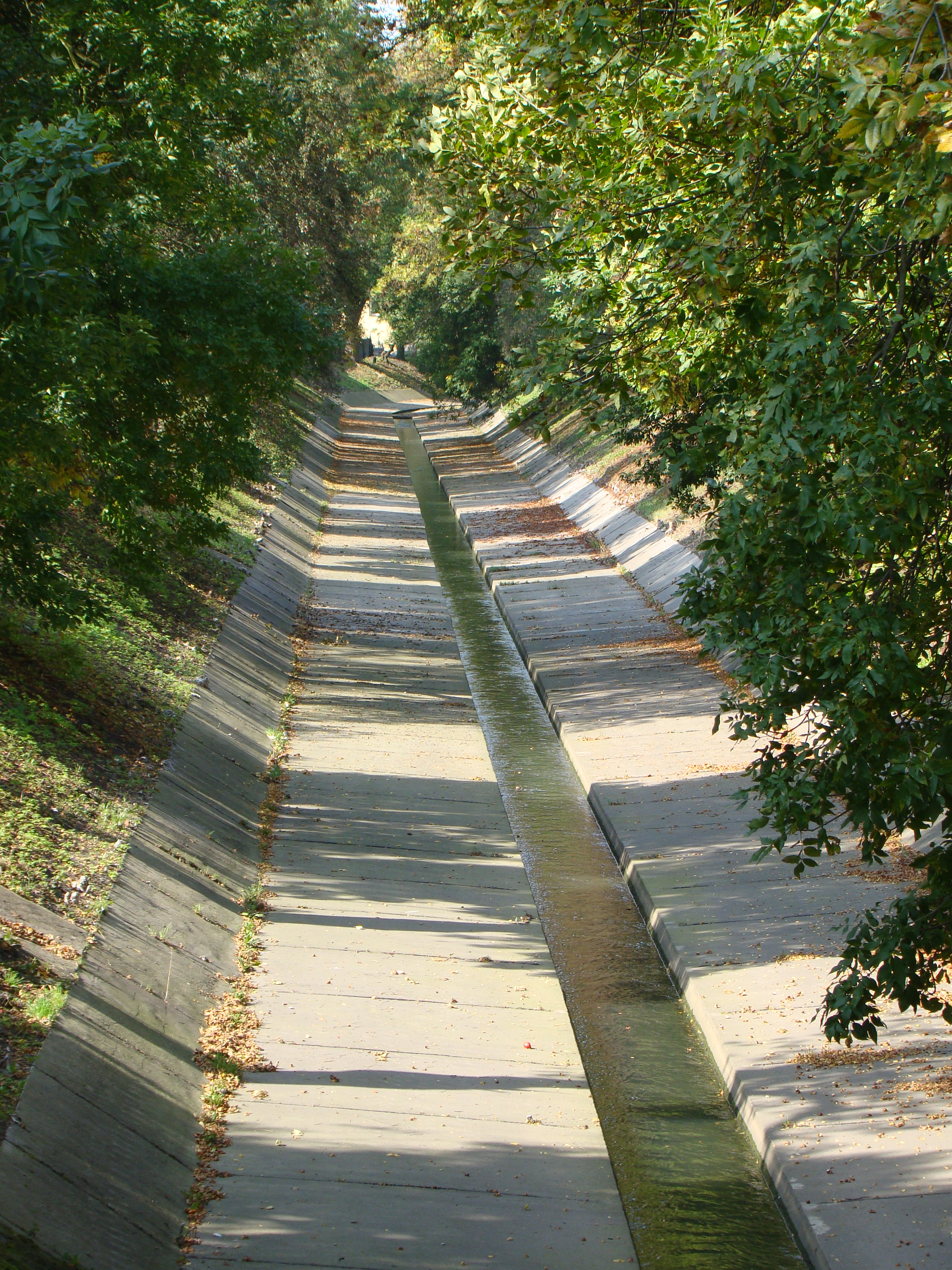
The Jasień is a regulated river throughout most of its course, the river flowing both underground and in overground canals

Starting with the late 1830s, with the advent of steam engines in the city's factories, the river ceased to function primarily as a source of water power and became a recipient of waste water. The situation deteriorated throughout the nineteenth and into the twentieth century as the river continued to receive significant amounts of polluted waters. In the 1890s Karl Scheibler's factory was established directly above the river, which flowed beneath the factory's floor, enabling easy discharge of industrial waste. When the construction of the city's sewer system began in 1925, the city's natural river network, including Jasień, was incorporated within the new underground canal system, and the river valley is now marked in some sections of the city centre only by the landscape retaining some of the original valley slopes, with the stream itself hidden from view for more than one third of its course. As the Jasień became part of the city's canal system, its main function became the transfer of both industrial and residential waste water and rainfall outside Łódź towards the Ner river. The twentieth century saw the construction of chemical plants on the Jasień, and the river was used for the disposal of toxic waste. It was only after the fall of communism in 1989 and after the collapse of the textile industry that the production of waste was reduced by 60%. The contamination levels in the waters of the Jasień have been systematically dropping since then. The current status of the river is that of an engineered stream whose function is to discharge rainfall from the area of the city. Only the final section of the Jasień in Rokicie survives in its natural, meandering form.

== Parks and ponds ==
The largest of the ponds on the Jasień river is that in the Księży Młyn district. Historical sources date the existence of the pond back to the early sixteenth century. Enlarged in the early nineteenth century to boost hydropower production, the pond had an area of 5 ha, but by the end of the century its function was only recreational. The residence of Edward Herbst, Karl Scheibler's son-in-law, was built on its northern side between 1875 and 1877, and the pond became part of the residential complex. In the 1970s the area of the pond was reduced to 3.46 ha due to the construction of a nearby road.

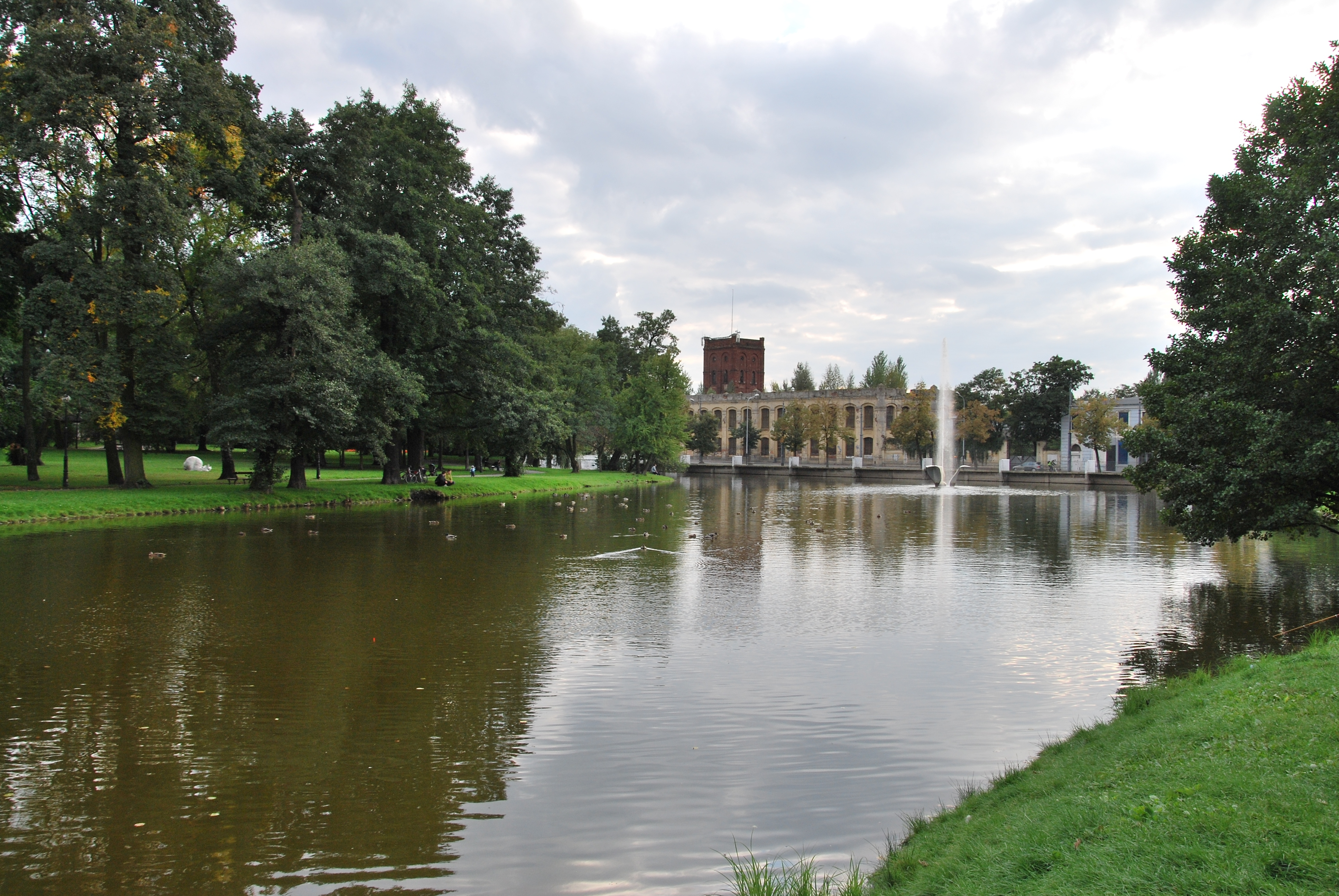
A pond on the Jasień river in Władysław Reymont Park

Another pond is located near the city's main thoroughfare, Piotrkowska Street, and adjacent to Ludwig Geyer's White Factory; there were originally here several ponds with islands, which were later connected to form one large body of water, with the islands incorporated into the park mainland. Originally formed within the current of the Jasień between 1825 and 1827 in order to power the local factories, the pond currently serves a recreational function as part of Władysław Reymont Park and is maintained with water from the municipal waterworks rather than the polluted river.

Other ponds located in the course of the Jasień river can also be found in Widzewski Park and next to the location of Wójtowski Mill in Park nad Jasieniem. There were also artificial ponds in Juliusz Słowacki park, which have since dried up.

== Tributaries ==
Jasień has three main tributaries:

- The Karolewka
- The Olechówka
- The Lamus

== See also ==
- Ner
- Łódź
