= Glinnik, Gmina Lubochnia =

Glinnik
- Village
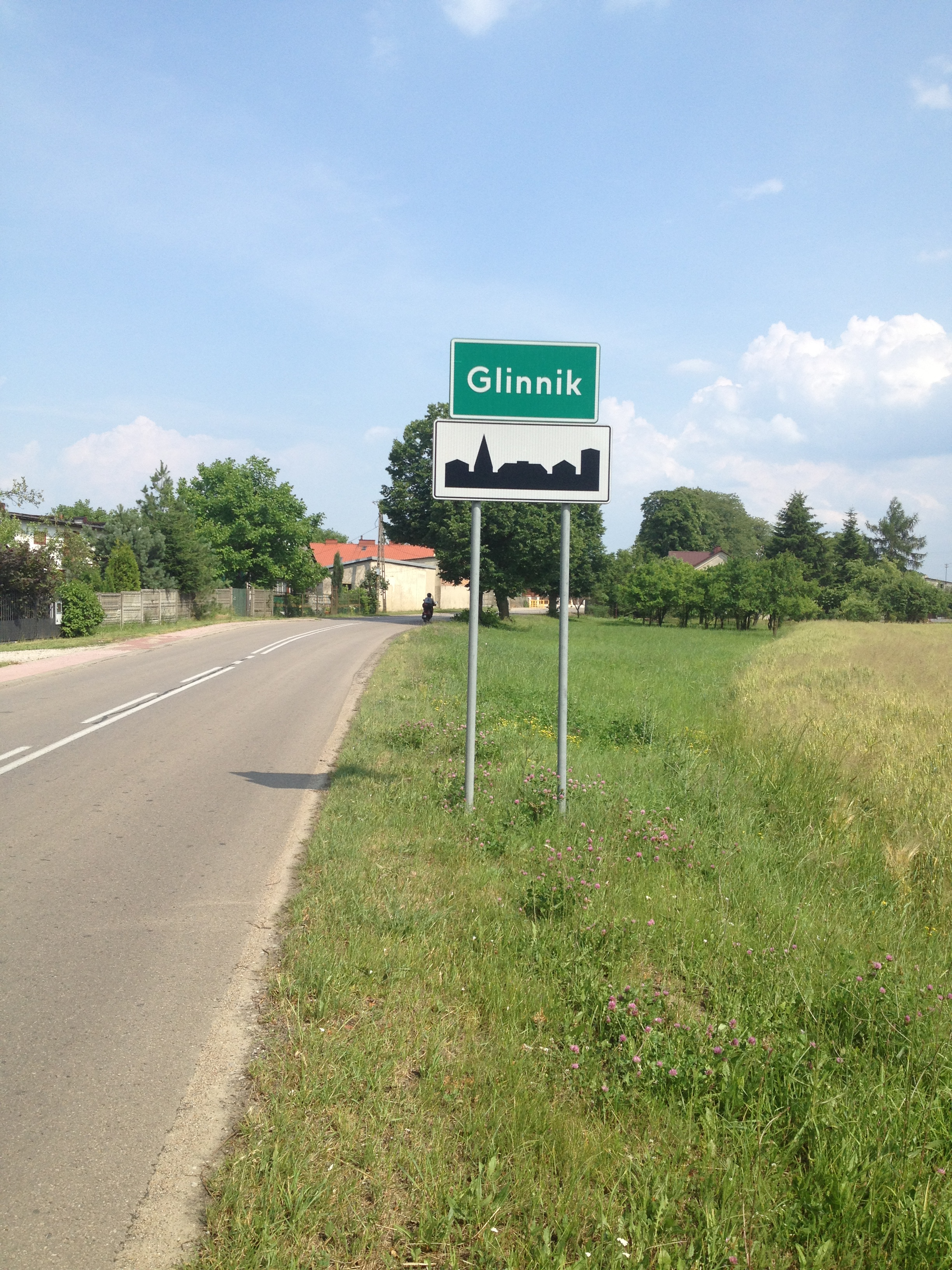

- Location within Poland
- Coordinates: 51°33′58″N 20°6′43″E
- Country: Poland
- Voivodeship: Łódź
- County: Tomaszów
- Gmina: Lubochnia
- Population: 570

Glinnik [ˈɡlinnik] is a village in the administrative district of Gmina Lubochnia, within Tomaszów County, Łódź Voivodeship, in central Poland.

In 2005 the village had a population of 570.
