= Stalag XXI-D =

- Poznań, German-occupied Poland
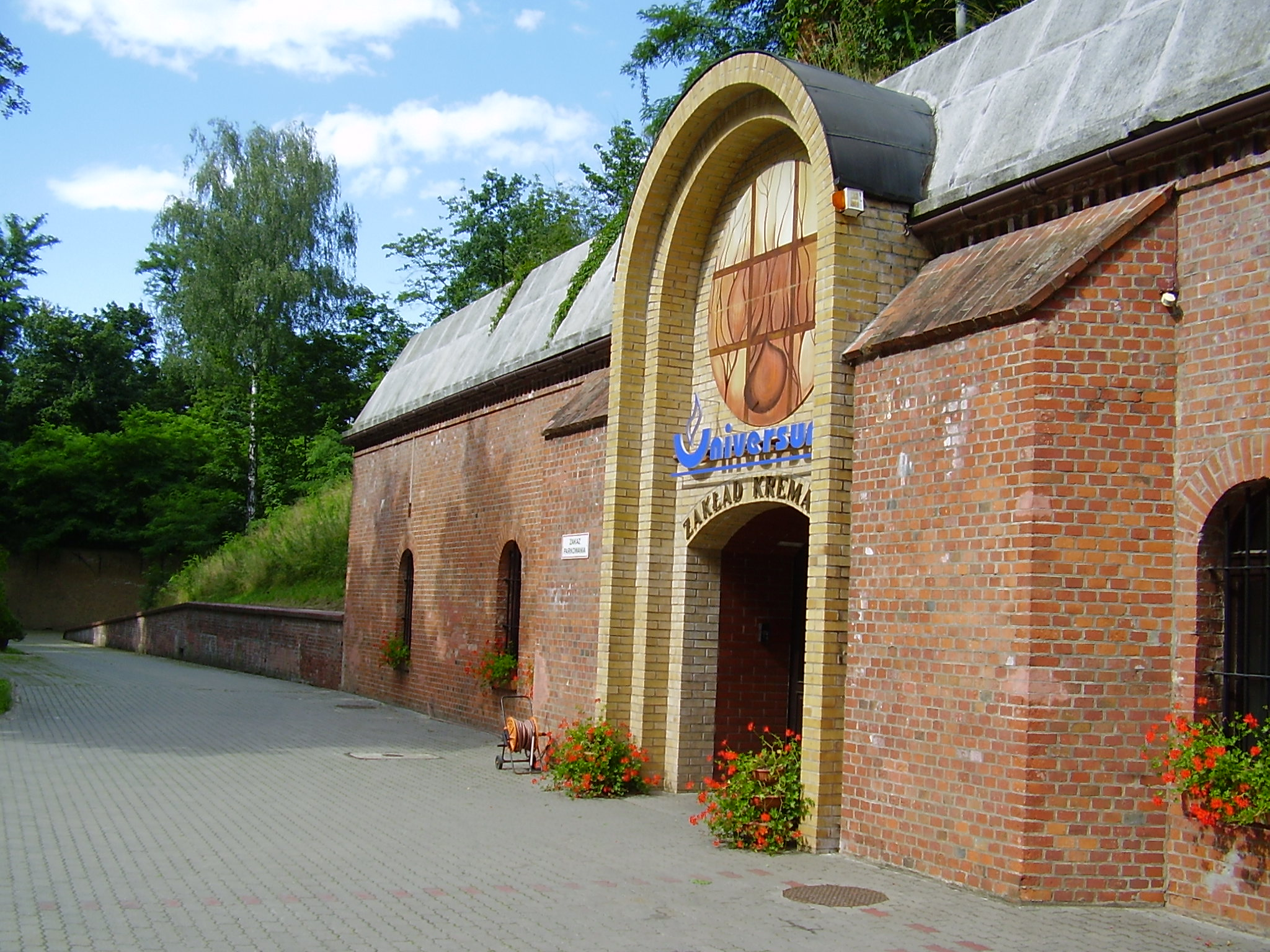
- Fort IIIA of the Poznań Fortress, one of the forts occupied by Stalag XXI-D

Site information
- Type: Prisoner-of-war camp
- Controlled by: Nazi Germany

Location
- Coordinates: 52°23′42″N 16°51′25″E

Site history
- In use: 1940–1945
- Battles/wars: World War II

Garrison information
- Occupants: Polish, French, British, Belgian, Dutch, Serbian, Soviet and Italian prisoners of war

Stalag XXI-D was a German World War II prisoner-of-war camp based in Poznań in German-occupied Poland, operated in 1940–1945. It held Polish, French, British, Belgian, Dutch, Serbian, Soviet and Italian POWs.

It was one of four main German POW camps in the Military District XXI, alongside the Stalag XXI-A in Ostrzeszów, Stalag XXI-B in Szubin and Stalag XXI-C in Wolsztyn. The Reserve Hospital in Ostrzeszów was subordinate to Stalag XXI-D.

== Description ==
Following the invasion of Poland in 1939 and the establishment of the Reichsgau Wartheland, Poznań became the administrative centre of 'Wehrkreis XXI' (Military District XXI). Some of Poznań's eighteenth century forts were used as prison camps. Most notorious of these was the concentration camp, Fort VII, which was predominately used to house Polish prisoners.

Some other forts, along with forced labour camp locations in the surrounding countryside, were used to hold PoWs. These collectively formed Stalag XXI-D and accommodated just over 3,000 prisoners in total.

=== Camps ===
In Poznań itself, three forts were used to house PoWs; Rauch, IIIA and VIII.

On the eastern, right, bank of the River Warta, near to the present day St. Roch bridge, stood Fort Rauch, the most southern of the right bank fortifications. Although partially demolished during the 1920s, it was used to accommodate about 750 men. An ICRC report of August 1941 described the fort as being "a circular building, made of red brick with three floors each with its windows facing an interior court which acts as the hub of the fort. There is no overcrowding and the rooms are not so large that they become noisy when filled with prisoners." Prisoners lived in many of the 50 basement rooms of the brick built redoubt, with 30-46 beds per room. Other rooms were used as a common room and theatre. After the war Fort Rauch was completely demolished and a college now stands on the site.

52°24′7.20″N 16°57′3.60″E

Further to the north-east, Fort IIIA (Fort Prittwitz) was used to hold Gaulist French soldiers. In 1993 Fort IIIA was converted for use as a crematorium. It is set in what are now grounds of the Milostow cemetery, which contains graves and memorials to Poznań's many war dead. 52°25′0.62″N 17°0′5.69″E

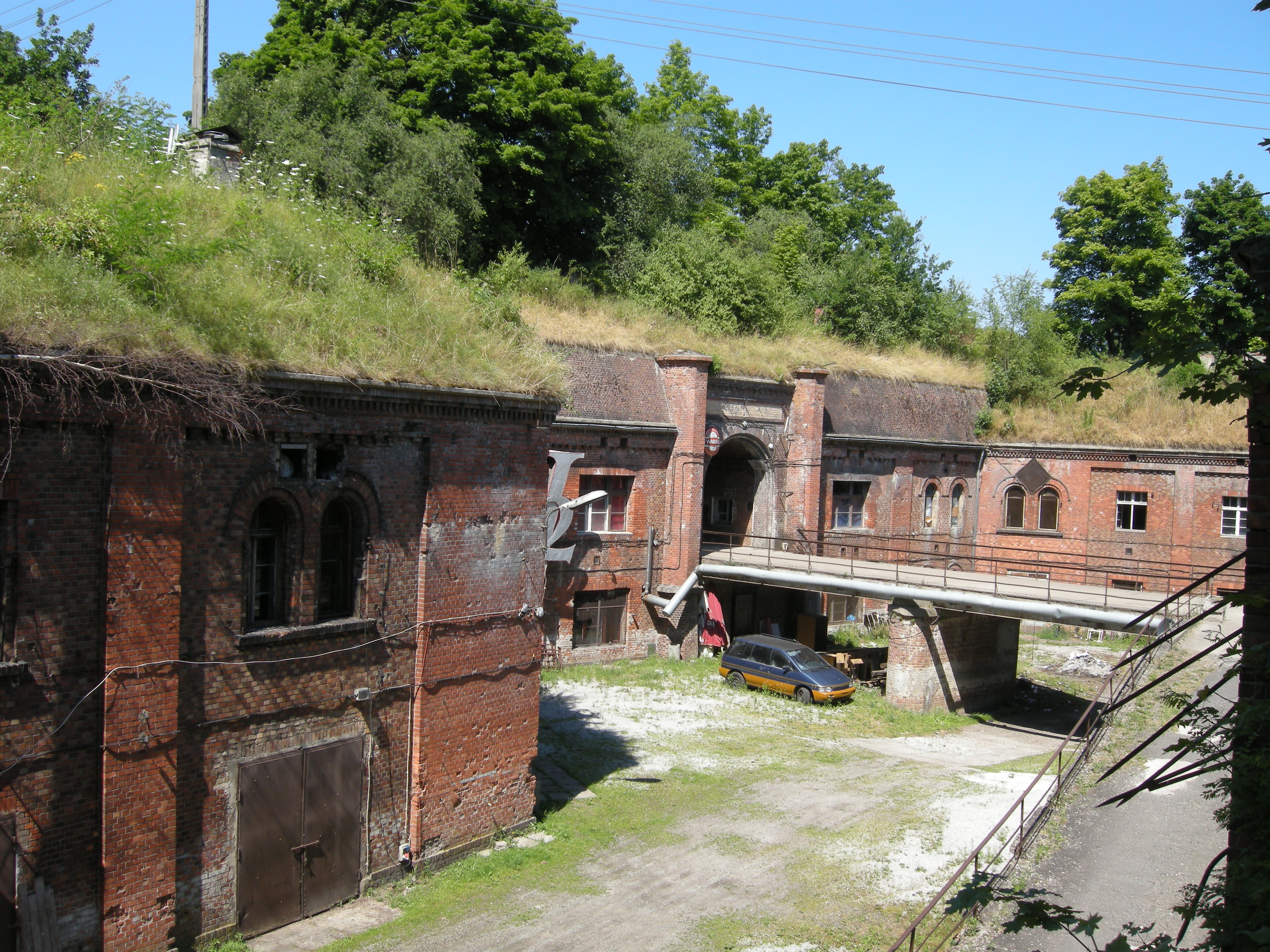
Fort VIII

Of the west, left bank forts, Fort VIII (Fort Grolman) was also used to house British and French prisoners.; The fort still stands, located to the south of Stadion Miejski, home to Lech Poznań football club. 52°23′42″N 16°51′25.2″E

Work camps were established in a wide area in and around Poznań. These included; Working Camp 4, Ostrowo Krotoszyn d14; Kuhndorf(possibly located at or near Sołacki Park renamed 'Kuhndorfpark' during the occupation in the Niestachów, Jeżyce area of north west Poznań); XXI-D/Z in Ostrzeszów June–December 1943 (about 130 km south-west of Poznań), XXI-D/Z in Mątwy September–December 1943 (near Inowrocław about 107 km north-east of Poznań), and even as far away as Łódź about 200 km to the east and closer to Warsaw than Poznań. Despite the distance, administration of the work camp at Łódź fell under Stalag XXI-D for part of the war. One group of PoWs were billeted in a disused textile dye works and worked in engineering workshops under the control of the German Ordnance Corps, supplying repair services for the Russian Front. This Ordnance Corps was known as H.K.P 20 (translated as Rearguard Vehicle Repair Park). The German Army training area at Biedrusko a few miles north of Poznan, was the location of a PoW working camp between July 1940 and June 1942. Initially a sub-camp of Stalag XXI-B, by September 1941 became camp 11 of Stalag XXI-D. Prisoners moved between three locations within a few kilometres during that period, including a disused Polish Cavalry stables. Prisoners worked, for example, filling bomb craters.

British prisoners-of-war who died in the camp were later buried at a cemetery of the Commonwealth War Graves Commission in Poznań.

== Timeline ==
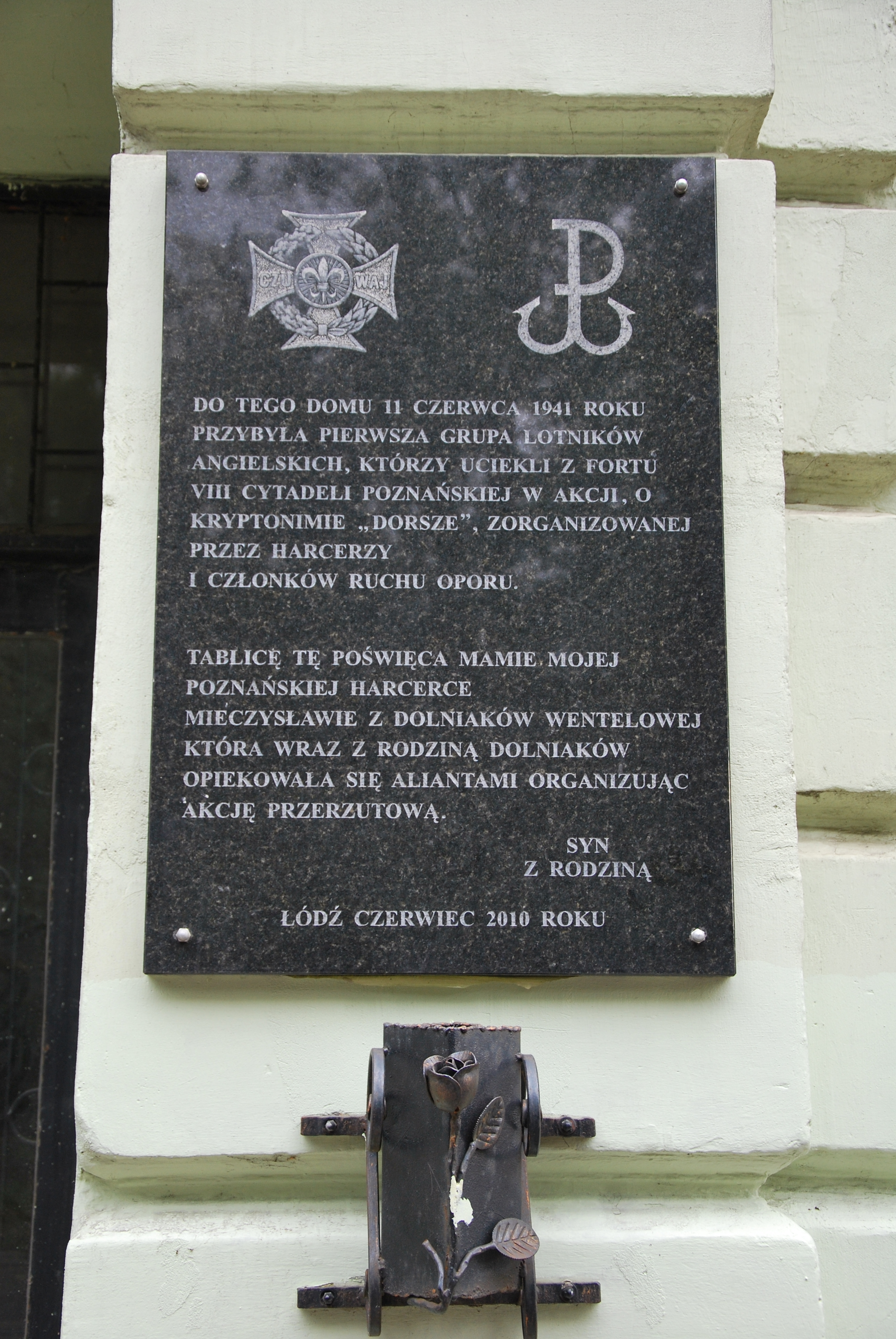
Memorial plaque in Łódź at the place to which British pilots escaped from Stalag XXI-D in 1941 during the Dorsze action organized by the Polish resistance

- June 1940 - August 1940 Stalag XXI-A/Z based at Poznań.
- Stalag XXI-D established 1 August 1940.
- Early March 1941 Ronald Littledale, Michael Sinclair and Gris Davies-Scourfield arrived at Fort VIII in a party of about 400 officers.
- 28 May 1941 Littledale, Sinclair and Davies-Scourfield escaped from Fort VIII in a handcart of rubbish, hiding in a rubbish pit outside the camp. The escape was orchestrated by the Polish resistance movement as part of the Dorsze operation. Poles then provided the escapees with shelter in Poznań, secured false documents and organized transport to Łódź and eventually Warsaw. Later on, the escapees were eventually recaptured by the Germans and sent to Oflag IV-C at Colditz Castle.
- 4 Oct 1941 - Allan Wolfe, 6th Royal West Kents, captured at Doullens, placed in solitary confinement at Fort Rauch for one of three failed escape attempts.
- October 1941 - POWs from the dissolved Stalag XXI-B camp in Tur brought to Stalag XXI-D and its forced labour subcamps.
- 12 May 1942 Murder of Sapper Alexander.
- 1942? - Allan Wolfe escaped while working on a road, walked to Czechoslovakia and remained there until liberated by the Russians.
- March 1943 - Funeral of Rifleman Cecil A. Ponsford KRRC, allegedly shot for persistent whistling.
- 31 March 1943 - Ellis Phythian of the Cheshire Regiment, captured at Tournai in May 1940, escaped from a working party, stowed away on a train to Nancy and returned to the UK via the Pyrenees into Spain in July 1943. He was awarded the DCM in December that year.
- April 1943 - Administration of H.K.P. 20 Lodz transferred from Stalag XXI-A to XXI-D.
- June 1943 - December 1943: Camp at Ostrzeszów (Schildberg) administratively transferred to Stalag XXI-D from Stalag XXI-A (remainder transferring to Oflag XXI-C).
- 15 July 1943 Shooting of two escaping prisoners of war at Working Camp 4 (making a rifle range), Ostrowo. One prisoner, Acting Able Seaman Esrom May of Point Rosie, Newfoundland, died of his wounds but the other, a Scottish private in the Gordon Highlanders, John Stewart, recovered.
- circa 1943(?) - weak beer supplied to replace contaminated drinking water. Stolen Radio concealed in barrel.
- 16 April 1944 Shooting of Fusilier Rigby and wounding of other prisoners of war.
- June 1944 - H.K.P. 20 Lodz physically relocated to Stalag 344 (Stalag VIII-B).
- October 1944 - Stalag XXI-D reached its maximum population of 7,250.
- PoWs were moved out before the advancing Red Army eventually took the town at the Battle of Poznań in 1945.
- February 1945 - Camp dissolved.

== Notable prisoners ==
- Gris Davies-Scourfield
- Hugo Ironside
- Ronald Littledale
- Michael Sinclair
- James Oswald Noel Vickers
- Peter Conder
- Horace "Jim" Greasley
- Ron Jeffery
- Albert Ernest Cox
- Capt Isidore Schrire, South African Jewish officer RAMC, later sent to Colditz

== See also ==
- Stalag
- List of German World War II POW camps
- Prisoner of war
- Prisoner-of-war camp
