= Kierz, Łódź Voivodeship =

Kierz
- Village
- Location within Poland
- Coordinates: 51°37′38″N 20°2′41″E
- Country: Poland
- Voivodeship: Łódź
- County: Tomaszów
- Gmina: Lubochnia
- Population: 30

Kierz [kʲɛʂ] is a village in the administrative district of Gmina Lubochnia, within Tomaszów County, Łódź Voivodeship, in central Poland.
