= Nowy Jasień =

- Village
- Location within Poland
- Coordinates: 51°37′N 20°6′E
- Country: Poland
- Voivodeship: Łódź
- County: Tomaszów
- Gmina: Lubochnia

Nowy Jasień [ˈnɔvɨ ˈjaɕɛɲ] is a village in the administrative district of Gmina Lubochnia, within Tomaszów County, Łódź Voivodeship, in central Poland.
