= Kruszewiec, Gmina Lubochnia =

Kruszewiec
- Village
- Location within Poland
- Coordinates: 51°34′46″N 20°0′8″E
- Country: Poland
- Voivodeship: Łódź
- County: Tomaszów
- Gmina: Lubochnia

Kruszewiec [kruˈʂɛvjɛt͡s] is a village in the administrative district of Gmina Lubochnia, within Tomaszów County, Łódź Voivodeship, in central Poland.
