= Skwierczyński =

Surname of a Polish noble family

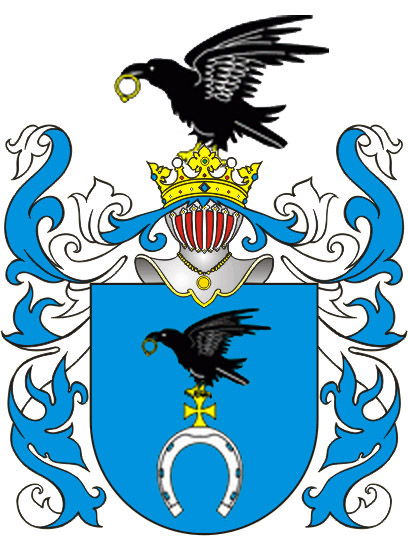
Ślepowron

Skwierczyński (different spellings: Skwirczyński, Śkwirczyński) of Ślepowron is the surname of a Polish szlachta (nobility) family from Podlaskie. The knight family came to the parish of Paprotnia in the area of Drohiczyn most likely from Masovia during the settlement led by Janusz I of Warsaw in the second half of the 14th century, or when Podlaskie transferred under the Lithuanian rule of Vytautas in 1405, who continued the settlement of Polish knights from areas of Masovia, as well as Łęczyca Voivodeship and Kuyavia in Podlaskie which had been deserted by the invasions of the Teutonic Knights and Yotvingians .

The earliest documentation of the surname Skwierczyński is as old as the early 15th century. 15th century judal books make numerous mentions of the family. The oldest one relates to Jakusz of Skwierczyn (currently divided into Skwierczyn Ruski and Skwierczyn Lacki, and previously Skwierczyn Duży and Skwierczyn Mały) who donated part of Skwierczyn Mały to the church in Paprotnia in 1429 – brothers Stanisław and Szczepan of Skwierczyn witnessed the deed. Other representatives of the family from Skwierczyn appear in the land registry documents of Drohiczyn midway through 15th century – they are: Piotr (1452), Stanisław (1454), Wawrzyniec (1456), Mikołaj and Paweł (1458). In 1452, Piotr of Skwierczyn acted in the capacity of a witness to the heirs of Ugoszcz. Furthermore, an historian Władysław Semkowicz writes about Banach of Skwierczyn in 1453. Next, in 1465 Paweł Skwierczyński acted as a witness for Wojciech of Mogilnica and in 1469 a statement was taken from witnesses of Paweł Skwierczyński: Raczek Koza and Andrzej Nasiłowski, who won compensation in court for the death of his nephew. The latter also got in trouble with priest Wojciech, pastor of Wyrozęby, by supporting in 1476 the claims of priest Piotr, the vicar of Kożuchów. The misunderstandings arose most likely from the earlier accession of the village of Skwierczyn to the parish of Wyrozęby by way of decree granted by the bishop Marcin of Łuka. Later in 1481 Paweł Skwierczyński had a court case against Piotr, vicar of Wyrozęby.

According to historian Tomasz Jaszczołt, in the years 1474–1484 mentions can be found of Jan Skwierczyński: Skwierczyński called Bujno, Jan, Wojciech and Paweł – brothers from Skwierczyn. We also know of Mikołaj Skwierczyński (1474).

The judicial book of Drohiczyn for 1474–1484 mentions Mikołaj Skwierczyński as arbitrator for Błoński (1474), Paweł (1474) and Jan Skwierczyński, who had a court case against Andrzej Nasiłowski (1474), Maciej Sawicki (1482), and pledged some of his land in Kobylany to Jan Smoniewski (1484). In conjunction, nephews of Jan Skwierczyński: Bujno, Jan, Wojciech, Paweł are also mentioned.

The judicial book of Drohiczyn for 1456–1595 includes entries about: Wawrzyniec of Skwierczyn (1456), Paweł of Skwierczyn, who pledged half of his heritage to Wit and Stanisław of Orlice in 1458, and later that year was a witness for the Wąż family. Also in 1458 the widow of Jakub of Kobylany sued Mikołaj of Skwierczyn for killing her husband but failed to bring witnesses and subsequently lost the court case. In 1485 Bartosz of Skwierczyn deferred the hearing with Bartosz and Klemens Wilk upon the request of Mikołaj Kobyleński. In 1485 brothers Bujno, Wojciech, Paweł and Jan Skwierczyński pledged 18 hectares in Kobylany to Jan Smoniewski, when Wilk Skwierczyński and Klemens Olędzki paid Mikołaj Kobyleński for their absence in court hearing . In the same year Jan Skwierczyński pledged a field to Wojciech Skorupka.

'Księga grodzka drohicka, s.II, nr 1 (1473–1484)’ – a judicial book – also includes numerous entries about the Skwierczyński family of Skwierczyn.

Towards end of 15th century Marcin Wąsowski took ownership of the majority of Skwierczyn Ruski.

In 1528 the Skwierczyński family of Skwierczyn provided two knights with horses for the pospolite ruszenie (common movement) in Drohiczyn. Almost complete registers of the Skwierczyn Lacki village dating back to the Pospolite ruszenie register of 1567 have been preserved as well as in the register of the pledge of allegiance to the Kingdom of Poland (1569), in which we can find numerous representatives of the Skwierczyński family of the 16th century.

The Union of Lublin joined Podlaskie to the Kingdom of Poland, whereas the szlachta (nobles) (who until then served the Grand Duchy of Lithuania despite being of mostly Polish-Masovian roots) pledged their allegiance to the Kingdom of Poland.

The szlachta of Drohiczyn were pledging their allegiance on 14 May 1569. Skwierczyn was represented by nobles: Stanisław son of Wojciech, Jan son of Tomasz, Mikołaj, Jan, Maciej sons of Szczęsny, as well as 2 others whose names are unknown. Skwirczyn Lacki was represented by szlachta/heirs: Malcher son of Mikołaj, Maciej, Mikołaj sons of Wojciech, Maciej, Bartłomiej sons of Paweł, Florian son of Walenty, Maciej, Paweł, Wojciech sons of Jan, Stanisław son of Andrzej, Stanisław son of Piotr, Aleksy son of Paweł, Antoni son of Jan, Andrzej, Piotr, Wojciech, Szczęsny sons of Stanisław, Stanisław, Antoni sons of Wojciech.

Later, Jan Skwierczyński was mentioned as an elector of king Władysław IV Vasa. In 1791 numerous Skwierczyński of Skwierczyn were mentioned as heirs of Skwierczyn Lacki when contributing to collections for the army.

Roll of arms 'Herbarz Polski' by Adam Boniecki only includes surnames beginning with A-M, but the Skwierczyński family is mentioned alongside the families: Cielemęcki of Rogala, Czapski of Leliwa, Czarnocki of Lis, Kalicki of Jastrzębiec, Zawisza-Kamieński of Przerowa, Kulczycki of Sas, Ługowski of Lubicz, Berens of Berens, Łęczycka of Niesobia. The alternative spellings of the surnames are mentioned alongside surnames: Lisiecki of Lis (Skwirczyński) and Koryciński of Topór (Śkwirczyński).

The Skwierczyński family spread from Podlasie relatively late and primarily towards the South. In 1699 we can find a mention of Johannes Skwierczyński, a notary to the council of the Bishop of Przemyśl. In 1782 Antoni, Wincenty and Wojciech Skwirczyński provided evidence of their nobility to the sejm in Terebovlia as part of the legitimization of szlachta in the Austrian partition also known as Galicja. Most family members connected with the Austrian partition, Kingdom of Galicia and Lodomeria, descend from Andrzej de Skuba Skwirczyński and his son Franciszek (born 1773) married to Józefa Tarszyńska (daughter of Józef and Tekla Fredro). Franciszek had issue of eight children, amongst whom: Franciszek Ksawery (born 1834 in Mielec died 1883 in Przemyśl) started the family branch that lived in and around Lwów, whereas Konstanty Jan (1815–1891) founded the Kraków branch of the family. Both family branches had a few officials in the 19th century Galicja, specifically – Kraków branch: Konstanty was an official at the Criminal Court of Rzeszów in 1838, and so was his brother Kazimierz, who later was promoted to the position of director in Kraków and acted on numerous occasions as witness in cases relating to the Galician slaughter (massacre of Polish nobles by peasants of Galicja) led by Jakub Szela in 1846. Konstanty's sons: Mieczysław (1849–1933) and Kazimierz (1846–1914) both were also officials. A famous Polish mountaineer Andrzej Skwirczyński (1943–2009) was Mieczysław's grandson.

Emil (born 1871 in Tarnów), son of Franciszek Ksawery (of the Lwów branch of the family) and Stanisława Miszewska (daughter of Emilian Miszewski, the judge of 'forum nobilium' (nobles' court of law) born 1844 in Gruszów) was a railway official in Lwów and had issue of two children with Maria Albinowska (daughter of Wincenty and Wiktoria Albinowski, born 1876 in Sokal). His son Stanisław (born 1898 in Sokal, died in Lublin) was First Lieutenant in the Polish Legions in World War I, and subsequently in the Polish army. Stanisław's grandson, Przemysław (born on November 3, 1952 in Lublin) is a Polish cinematographer.

Currently, around 800 people in Poland, as well as substantial numbers abroad bear the surname Skwierczyński. Surname Skwirczyński is held by only around 30 people in Poland and even fewer abroad. The surname Śkwirczyński is by now most likely extinct.

== Notable family members ==
- Grzegorz Skwierczyński, member of Sejm 2005–2009 (member of the Polish Parliament 2005–2009)
- Przemysław Skwirczyński, Polish cinematographer

== See also ==
- Ślepowron coat of arms
- Skwierczyn-Dwór
- Skwierczyn-Wieś
- Paprotnia, Siedlce County
- Skwarczyński
