= Skrzeszew, Sokołów County =

Skrzeszew
- Village
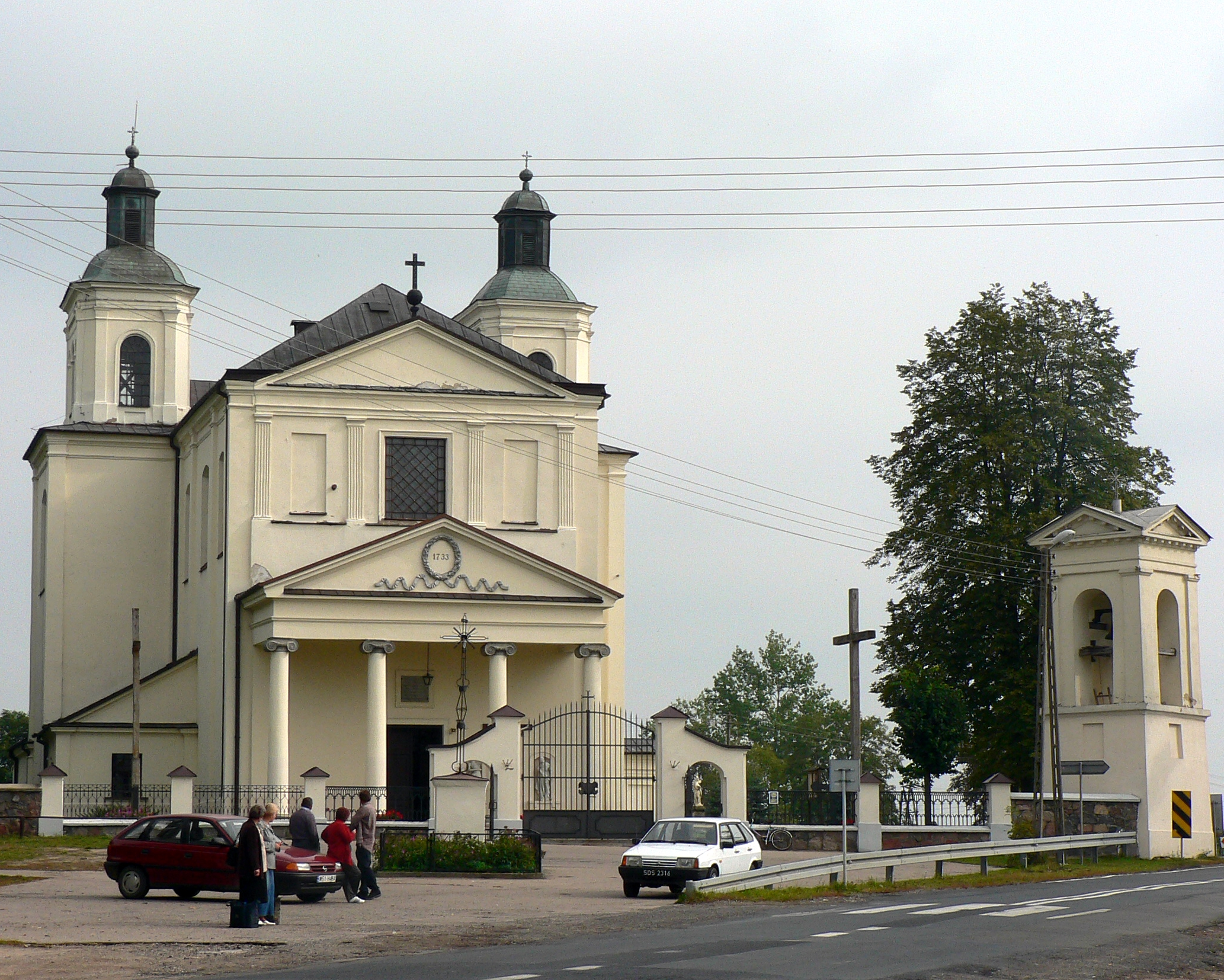
- St. Stanislaus church (1705, 1733)

- Location within Poland
- Coordinates: 52°24′N 22°31′E
- Country: Poland
- Voivodeship: Masovian
- County: Sokołów
- Gmina: Repki

Population
  - Total: 460
- Time zone: UTC+1 (CET)
  - Summer (DST): UTC+2 (CEST)

Skrzeszew [ˈskʂɛʂɛf] is a village in the administrative district of Gmina Repki, within Sokołów County, Masovian Voivodeship, in eastern Poland. The village lies approximately 10 km (6 mi) east of Repki, 19 km (12 mi) east of Sokołów Podlaski, and 106 km (66 mi) east of Warsaw.

== History ==
In 1428 the village was given by Vytautas the Great to Diocese of Łuck. The parish of Skrzeszew was established in 1446. It was a private church town, administratively located in the Drohiczyn County in the Podlaskie Voivodeship in the Lesser Poland Province of the Kingdom of Poland. In 1808 the village was bought by Franciszek Obniski, who equipped the interior of the church. The Baroque-Neoclassical church from 1st half of 18th century, was damaged in 1915 and restored in 1918. The manor of Skrzeszew was destroyed by Soviet occupation forces in 1939.
