= Helena Mniszek =

Polish novelist (1878-1943)

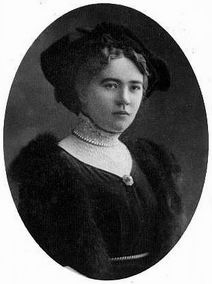
Helena Mniszkówna

Helena Mniszek (family name Mniszek-Tchorznicka, surname by first marriage: Chyżyńska, surname by second marriage: Rawicz Radomyska; 24 May 1878 – 18 March 1943) was a Polish novelist. She was born in Volhynia and died in Sabnie. Her debut novel Trędowata written in 1909 brought her to prominence.

== Life ==
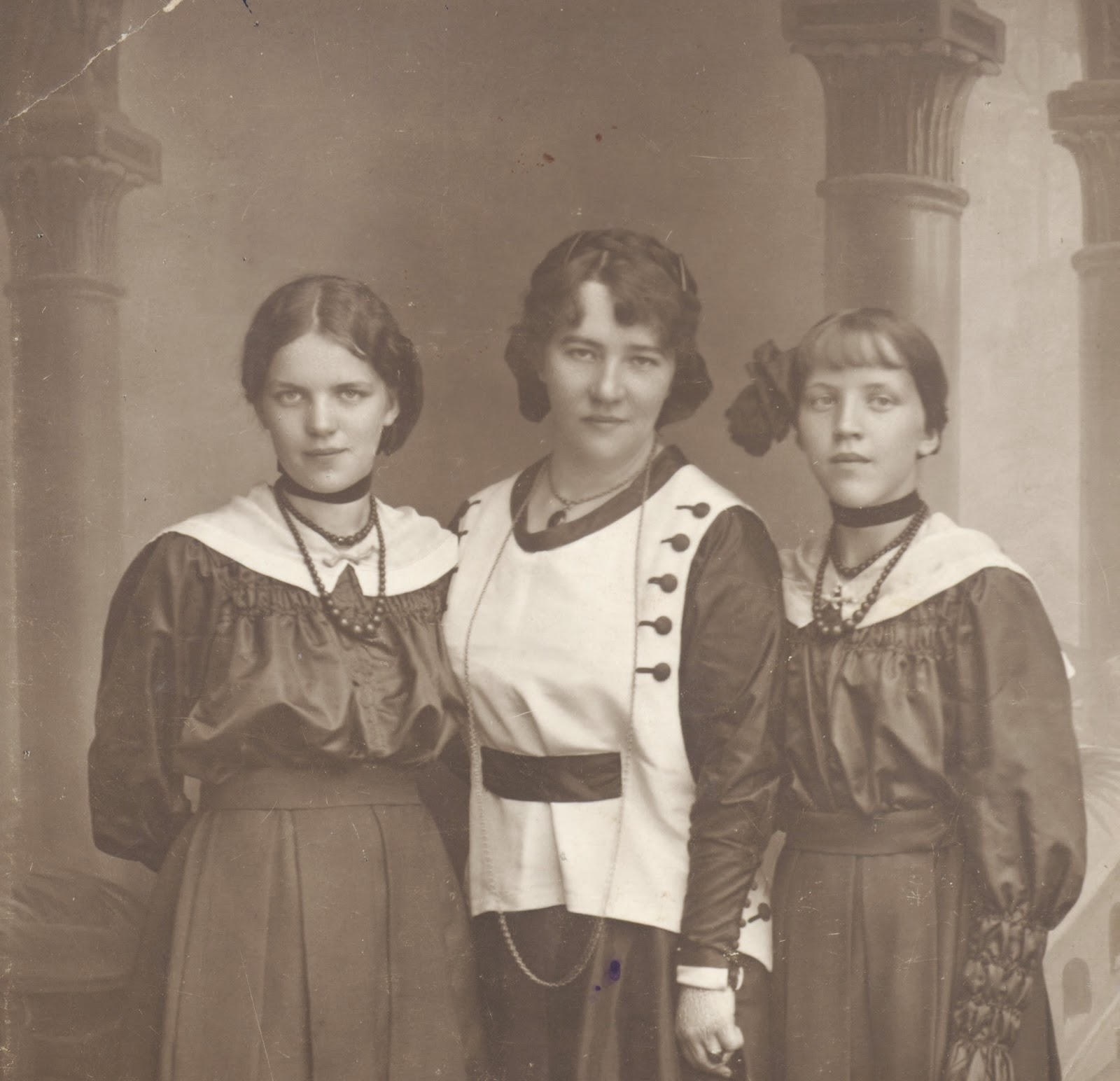
Helena Mniszek's youth

Mniszek was born in Volhynia. Much of her family background is known due to the fact that she came from one of the oldest noble families in Podlachia. Even though she was homeschooled, she was able to speak 4 languages and was versed in literature. She spent her formative years travelling, playing the piano and declaiming poems. At the age of 19 she married Władysław Chyżyński. In 1903, after her husband's death, she moved back to Sabnie, where she fell in love with Adolf Lortsch who became an inspiration for a novel called "Panicz" in 1912.

In 1909 she published "Trędowata", for which she was given recognition not only among middle class readers but also among the upper classes. The manuscript of the novel was reviewed by Bolesław Prus. The novel itself has been dramatised 4 different times by 4 different directors : Edward Puchalski, Juliusz Gardan, Jerzy Hoffman and Wojciech Rawecki together with Krzysztof Lang.

She remarried in 1910 and moved to Kuchary, where she stayed until 1939, when German soldiers threw her out of her property. After that she came back to Sabnie, where she lived until her death. She was buried in Zembrów in a family cemetery.

In 1951 all of her works were prohibited due to Censorship in the Polish People's Republic. Communist authorities put a ban on all the books which content may have been harmful for the society.

== Activities for the benefit of society ==
Apart from raising her children and writing novels Mniszek also participated in social work. She busied herself with work for charities and society. She set up a school for young girls and a theatre group for the village children and was always willing to help the ones in need. During the World War I she took care of wounded soldiers.

== Works ==
Mniszek is considered to be graphomaniac, because no matter where she was, she was always writing new works of art. She published more than 22 books, yet none of them was ever in a position to surpass the success of "Trędowata". She described love affairs among the upper crust and she emphasised a stereotype about the glamorous lifestyles of the people she portrayed.

=== Bibliography ===
- Trędowata, Cracow 1909
- Ordynat Michorowski, Kiev 1910
- Zaszumiały Pióra, Kiev 1911
- Panicz, Cracow 1912
- Książęta Boru, Kiev 1912
- Prymicja, Kiev 1912
- Gehenna, Kiev 1912
- Czciciele Szatana, Warsaw 1918
- Pluton i Persefona. Baśń fantastyczna na tle mitologicznym, Warsaw 1919
- Pustelnik, Poznań 1919
- Verte, Poznań 1921
- Prawa ludzi, Lublin 1922
- Sfinks, Warsaw 1922
- Królowa Gizella, Poznań 1925
- Dziedzictwo, Poznań 1927
- Z ziemi łez i krwi, 1927
- Kwiat magnolii, Poznań 1928
- Powojenni, Poznań 1929
- Magnesy serc, Warsaw 1930
- Słońce, 1933
- Smak miłości, 1941

== Film versions ==
3 of her novels were adapted into movies. "Trędowata" was dramatised 4 times (3 films and one TV series);

- 1926 Trędowata, directed by Edward Puchalski
- 1936 Trędowata, directed by Juliusz Gardan
- 1937 Ordynat Michorowski, directed by Henryk Szaro
- 1938 Gehenna, directed by Michał Waszyński
- 1976 Trędowata, directed by Jerzy Hoffman
- 1999 Trędowata (TV series), directed by Wojciech Rawecki and Krzysztof Lang

== See also ==
- Censorship in the Polish People's Republic
