= Sawice-Bronisze =

- Village
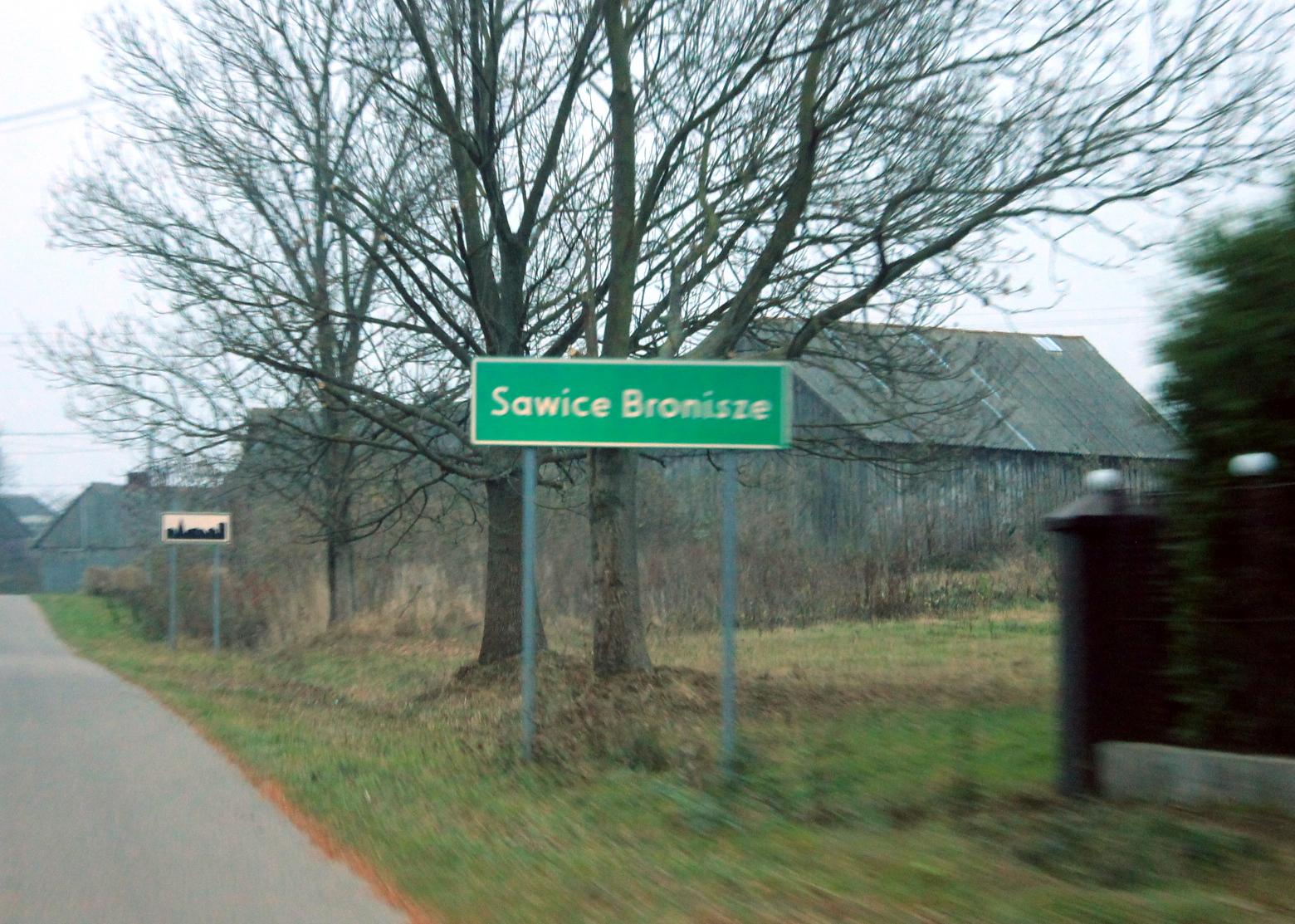

- Location within Poland
- Coordinates: 52°20′N 22°28′E
- Country: Poland
- Voivodeship: Masovian
- County: Sokołów
- Gmina: Repki
- Time zone: UTC+1 (CET)
  - Summer (DST): UTC+2 (CEST)

Sawice-Bronisze [saˈvit͡sɛ brɔˈniʂɛ] is a village in the administrative district of Gmina Repki, within Sokołów County, Masovian Voivodeship, in east-central Poland.

Eight Polish citizens were murdered by Nazi Germany in the village during World War II.
