= Gałki, Sokołów County =

Gałki
- Village
- Location within Poland
- Coordinates: 52°24′11″N 22°26′58″E
- Country: Poland
- Voivodeship: Masovian
- County: Sokołów
- Gmina: Repki

Gałki [ˈɡau̯ki] is a village in the administrative district of Gmina Repki, within Sokołów County, Masovian Voivodeship, in east-central Poland.
