= Jasień, Masovian Voivodeship =

Jasień
- Village
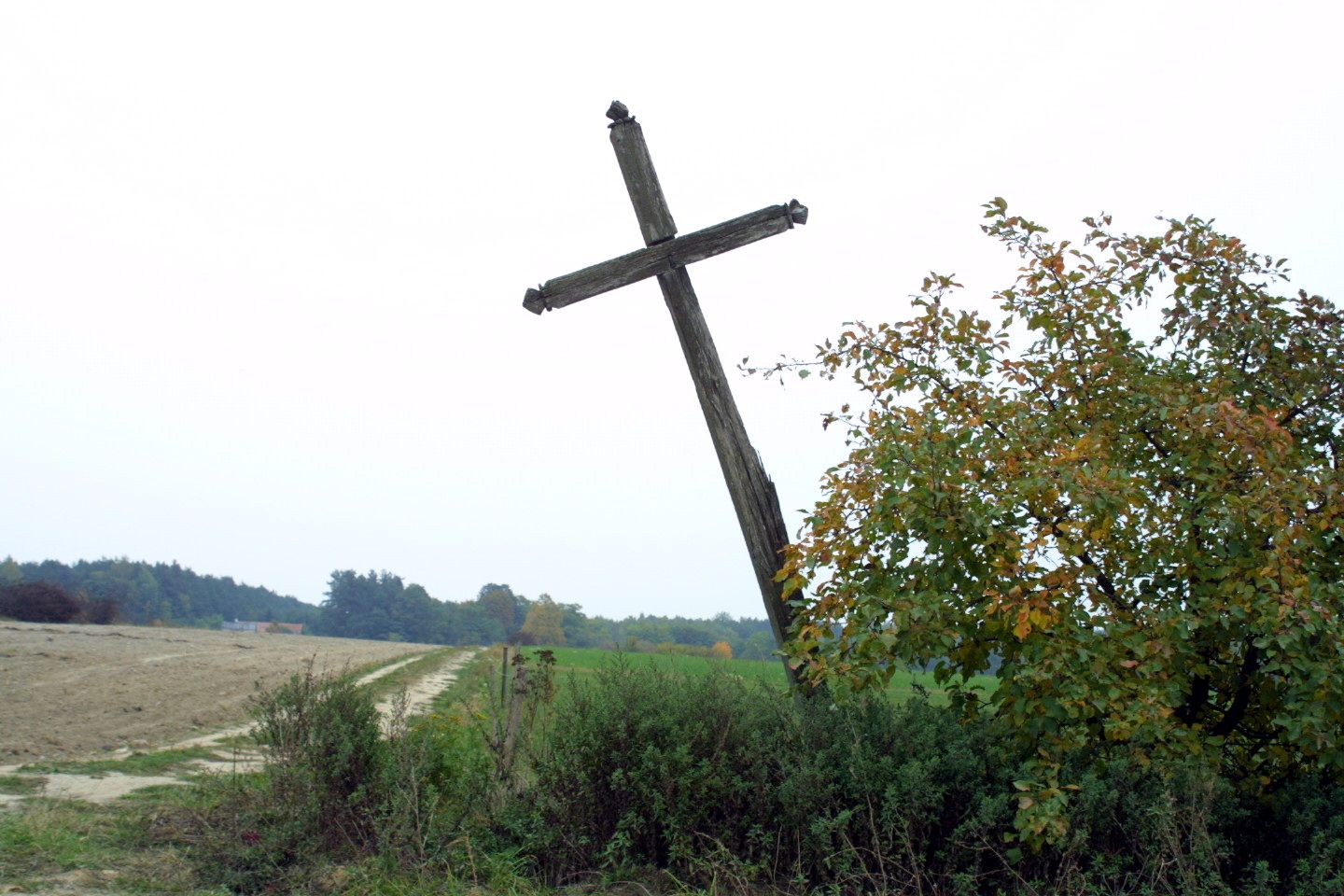

- Location within Poland
- Coordinates: 52°25′57″N 22°19′16″E
- Country: Poland
- Voivodeship: Masovian
- County: Sokołów
- Gmina: Repki

Jasień [ˈjaɕɛɲ] is a village in the administrative district of Gmina Repki, within Sokołów County, Masovian Voivodeship, in east-central Poland.
