= Mołomotki-Dwór =

Village in Gmina Repki, Poland

- Village
- Location within Poland
- Coordinates: 52°23′18″N 22°26′27″E
- Country: Poland
- Voivodeship: Masovian
- County: Sokołów
- Gmina: Repki

Mołomotki-Dwór [mɔwɔˈmɔtki ˈdvur] is a village in the administrative district of Gmina Repki, within Sokołów County, Masovian Voivodeship, in east-central Poland.
