= Nieciecz-Dwór =

- Village
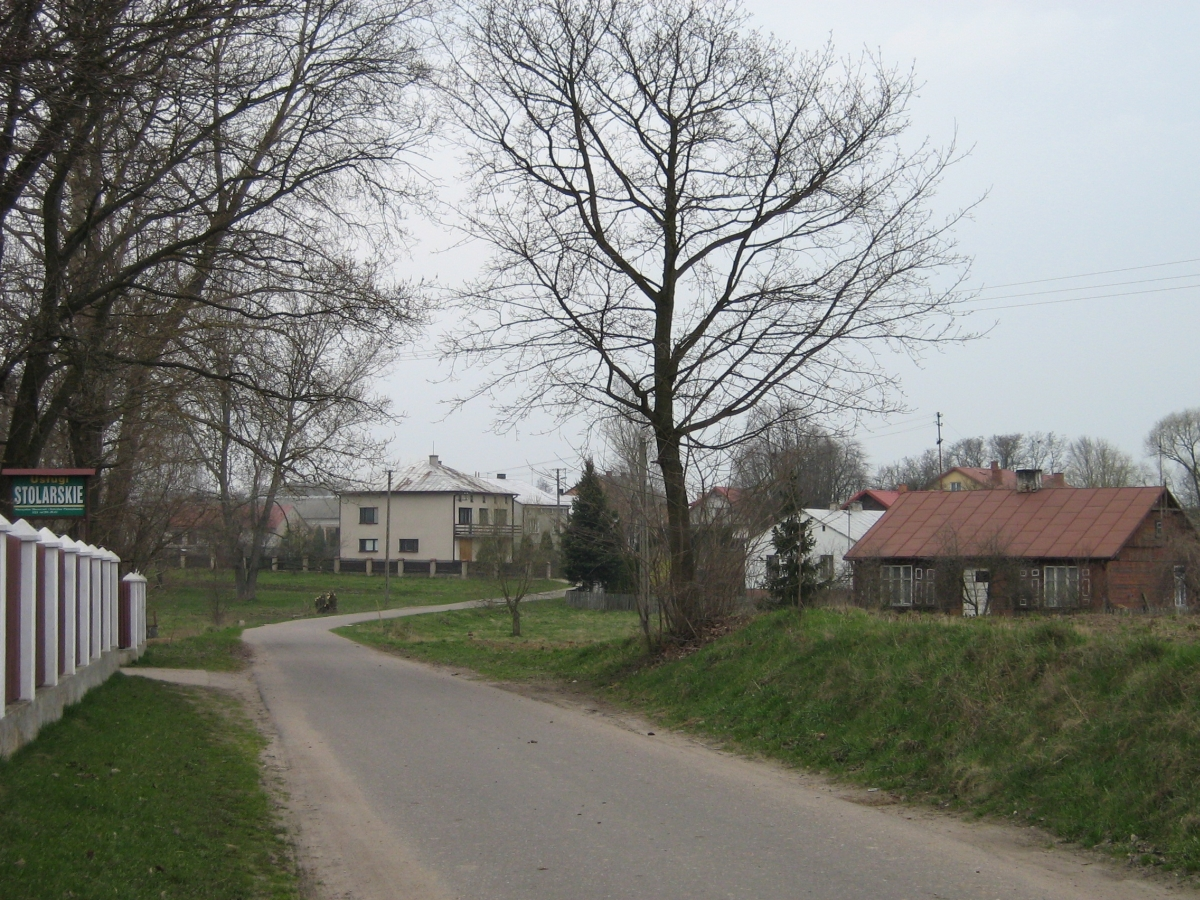

- Location within Poland
- Coordinates: 52°27′21″N 22°18′46″E
- Country: Poland
- Voivodeship: Masovian
- County: Sokołów
- Gmina: Sabnie
- Population: 180

Nieciecz-Dwór (Polish pronunciation: [ˈɲɛtɕɛdʐ ˈdvur]) is a village in the administrative district of Gmina Sabnie, within Sokołów County, Masovian Voivodeship, in east-central Poland.
