= Kolonia Kurowice =

- Dapping
- Location within Poland
- Coordinates: 52°32′N 22°20′E
- Country: Poland
- Voivodeship: Masovian
- County: Sokołów
- Gmina: Sabnie

Kolonia Kurowice [kɔˈlɔɲa kurɔˈvit͡sɛ] is a village in the administrative district of Gmina Sabnie, within Sokołów County, Masovian Voivodeship, in east-central Poland.
