= Gmina Bielany =

Gmina Bielany Bielany Commune
- Gmina
- Interactive map of Gmina Bielany
- Coordinates (Bielany): 52°20′30″N 22°14′45″E
- Country: Poland
- Voivodeship: Masovian
- County: Sokołów
- Seat: Bielany

Area
  - Total: 109.6 km^{2} (42.3 sq mi)

Population (2013)
  - Total: 3,731
  - Density: 34.04/km^{2} (88.17/sq mi)

Gmina Bielany is a rural gmina (administrative district) in Sokołów County, Masovian Voivodeship, in east-central Poland. Its seat is the village of Bielany, which lies approximately 8 kilometres (5 mi) south of Sokołów Podlaski and 86 km (53 mi) east of Warsaw.

The gmina covers an area of 109.6 square kilometres (42.3 sq mi), and as of 2006 its total population is 3,854 (3,731 in 2013).

== Villages ==
Gmina Bielany contains the villages and settlements of Bielany, Bielany-Jarosławy, Bielany-Wąsy, Błonie Duże, Błonie Małe, Brodacze, Dmochy-Rętki, Dmochy-Rogale, Korabie, Kowiesy, Kożuchów, Kożuchówek, Księżopole-Budki, Księżopole-Komory, Kudelczyn, Paczuski Duże, Patrykozy, Patrykozy-Kolonia, Rozbity Kamień, Ruciany, Ruda-Kolonia, Sikory, Trebień, Wańtuchy, Wiechetki Duże, Wiechetki Małe, Wojewódki Dolne, Wojewódki Górne and Wyszomierz.

== Neighbouring gminas ==
Gmina Bielany is bordered by the gminas of Liw, Mokobody, Paprotnia, Repki, Sokołów Podlaski and Suchożebry.
