= Bielany-Jarosławy =

- Village
- Location within Poland
- Coordinates: 52°20′09″N 22°15′16″E
- Country: Poland
- Voivodeship: Masovian
- County: Sokołów
- Gmina: Bielany
- Time zone: UTC+1 (CET)
  - Summer (DST): UTC+2 (CEST)

Bielany-Jarosławy [bjɛˈlanɨ jarɔˈswavɨ] is a village in the administrative district of Gmina Bielany, within Sokołów County, Masovian Voivodeship, in east-central Poland.

Six Polish citizens were murdered by Nazi Germany in the village during World War II.
