= Rytele-Olechny =

- Village
- Location within Poland
- Coordinates: 52°40′42″N 22°10′07″E
- Country: Poland
- Voivodeship: Masovian
- County: Sokołów
- Gmina: Ceranów

Rytele-Olechny [rɨˈtɛlɛ ɔˈlɛxnɨ] is a village in the administrative district of Gmina Ceranów, within Sokołów County, Masovian Voivodeship, in east-central Poland.
