= Suchodół Szlachecki =

- Village
- Location within Poland
- Coordinates: 52°29′27″N 22°16′59″E
- Country: Poland
- Voivodeship: Masovian
- County: Sokołów
- Gmina: Sabnie

Suchodół Szlachecki (Polish pronunciation: [suˈxɔduw ʂlaˈxɛtskʲi]) is a village in the administrative district of Gmina Sabnie, within Sokołów County, Masovian Voivodeship, in east-central Poland.
