= Wojewódki Dolne =

- Village
- Location within Poland
- Coordinates: 52°22′N 22°14′E
- Country: Poland
- Voivodeship: Masovian
- County: Sokołów
- Gmina: Bielany

Wojewódki Dolne (Polish pronunciation: [vɔjɛˈvutkʲi ˈdɔlnɛ]) is a village in the administrative district of Gmina Bielany, within Sokołów County, Masovian Voivodeship, in east-central Poland.
