= Bałki =

- Village
- Location within Poland
- Coordinates: 52°25′44″N 22°21′30″E
- Country: Poland
- Voivodeship: Masovian
- County: Sokołów
- Gmina: Repki
- Elevation: 150 m (490 ft)

Bałki [ˈbau̯ki] is a village in the administrative district of Gmina Repki, within Sokołów County, Masovian Voivodeship, in east-central Poland.
