= Remiszew Duży =

- Village
- Location within Poland
- Coordinates: 52°23′N 22°20′E
- Country: Poland
- Voivodeship: Masovian
- County: Sokołów
- Gmina: Repki

Remiszew Duży [rɛˈmiʂɛf ˈduʐɨ] is a village in the administrative district of Gmina Repki, within Sokołów County, Masovian Voivodeship, in east-central Poland.
