= Radość, Sokołów County =

Radość
- Village
- Location within Poland
- Coordinates: 52°37′20″N 22°11′29″E
- Country: Poland
- Voivodeship: Masovian
- County: Sokołów
- Gmina: Ceranów

Radość [ˈradɔɕt͡ɕ] is a village in the administrative district of Gmina Ceranów, within Sokołów County, Masovian Voivodeship, in east-central Poland.
