= Liszki, Masovian Voivodeship =

Liszki
- Village
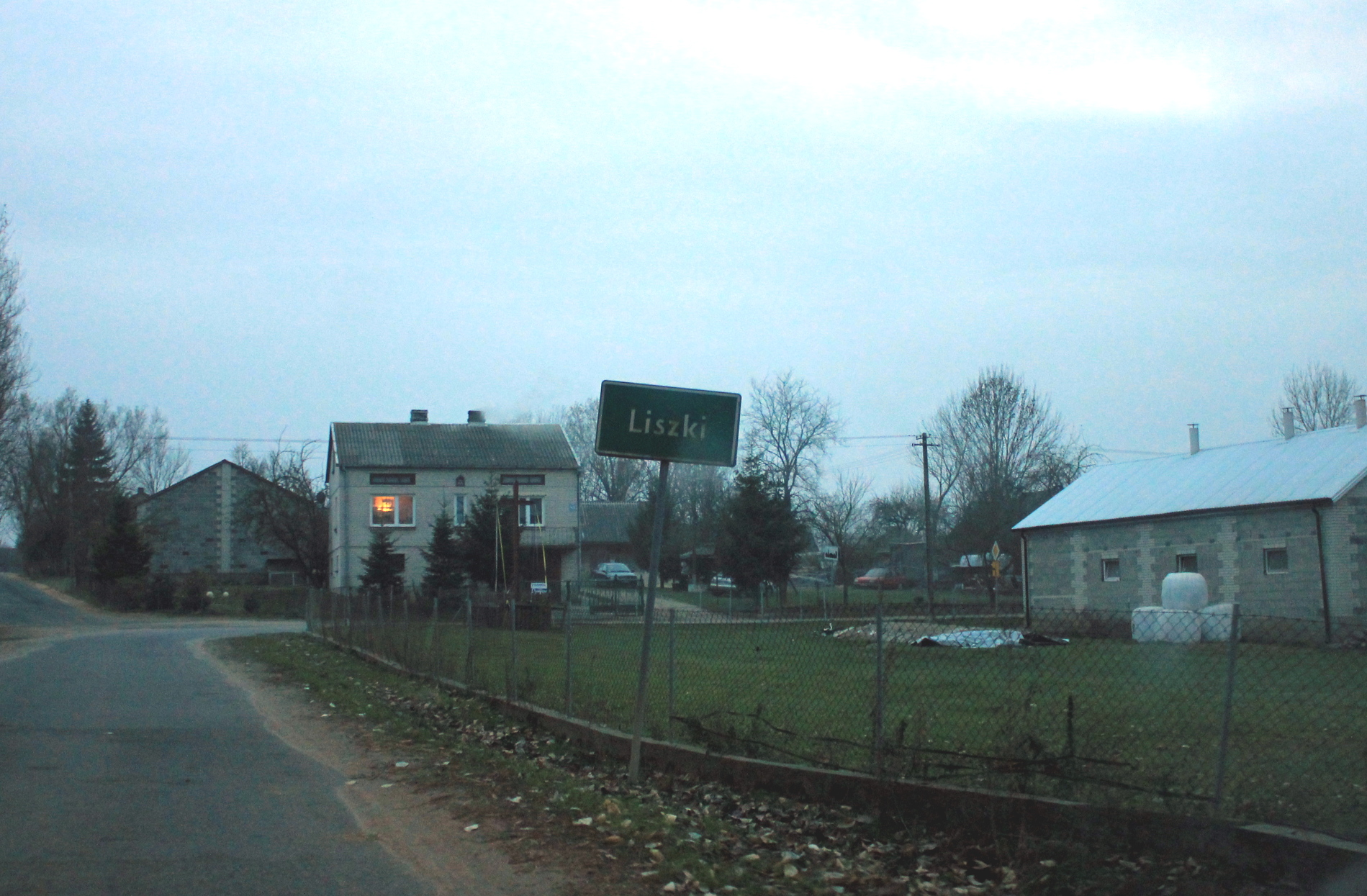

- Location within Poland
- Coordinates: 52°23′N 22°30′E
- Country: Poland
- Voivodeship: Masovian
- County: Sokołów
- Gmina: Repki

Liszki [ˈliʂki] is a village in the administrative district of Gmina Repki, within Sokołów County, Masovian Voivodeship, in east-central Poland.
