= Tchórznica Szlachecka =

- Village
- Location within Poland
- Coordinates: 52°30′01″N 22°21′52″E
- Country: Poland
- Voivodeship: Masovian
- County: Sokołów
- Gmina: Sabnie

Tchórznica Szlachecka (Polish pronunciation: [txuʐˈɲitsa ʂlaˈxɛtska]) is a village in the administrative district of Gmina Sabnie, within Sokołów County, Masovian Voivodeship, in east-central Poland.
