= Wyrozęby-Podawce =

- Village
- Location within Poland
- Coordinates: 52°20′35″N 22°26′4″E
- Country: Poland
- Voivodeship: Masovian
- County: Sokołów
- Gmina: Repki
- Population (approx.): 350

Wyrozęby-Podawce [vɨrɔˈzɛmbɨ pɔˈdaft͡sɛ] is a village in the administrative district of Gmina Repki, within Sokołów County, Masovian Voivodeship, in east-central Poland.
