= Bielany-Wąsy =

- Village
- Location within Poland
- Coordinates: 52°21′01″N 22°14′45″E
- Country: Poland
- Voivodeship: Masovian
- County: Sokołów
- Gmina: Bielany

Bielany-Wąsy [bjɛˈlanɨ ˈvɔ̃sɨ] is a village in the administrative district of Gmina Bielany, within Sokołów County, Masovian Voivodeship, in east-central Poland.
