= Wyrozęby-Konaty =

- Village
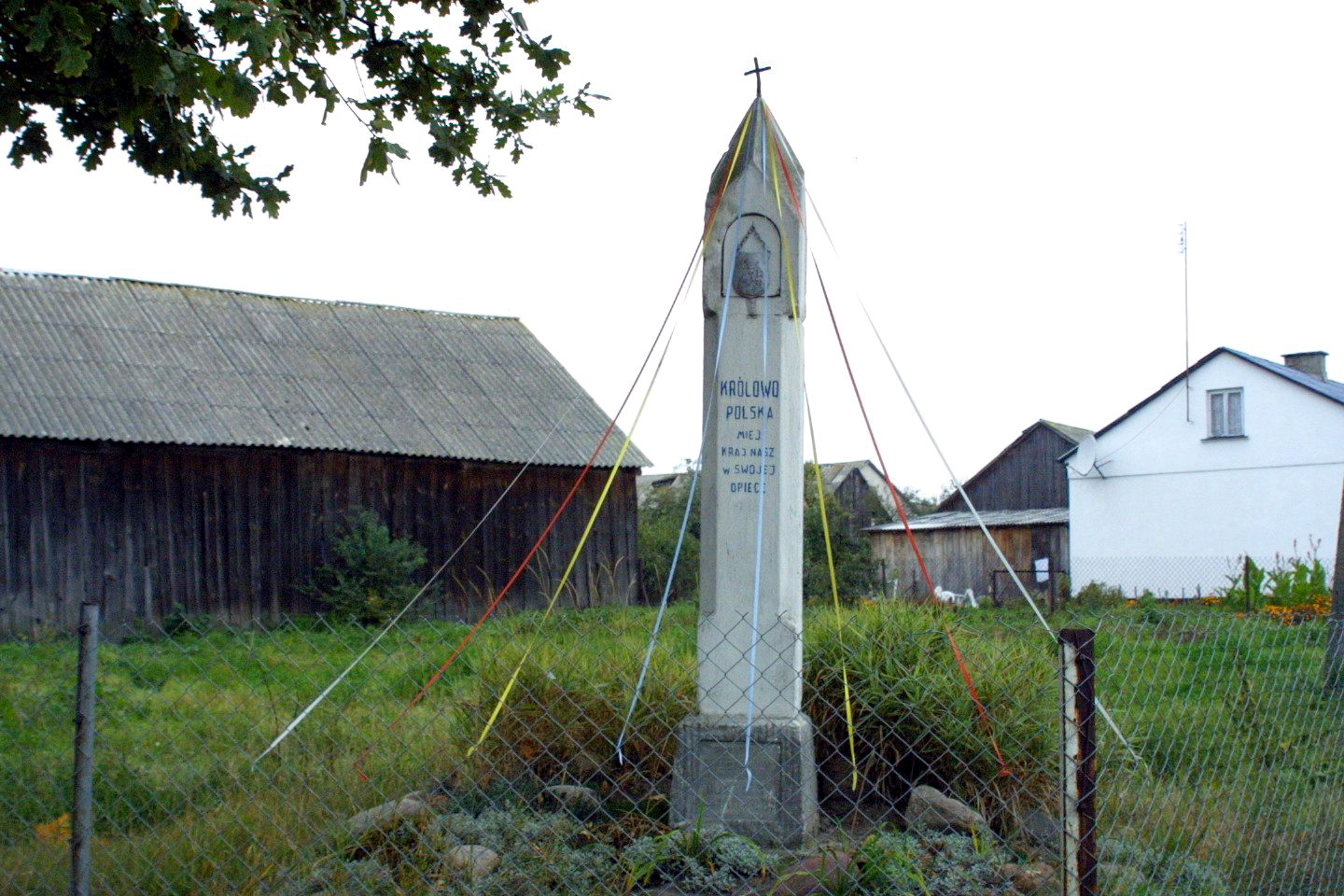

- Location within Poland
- Coordinates: 52°20′N 22°26′E
- Country: Poland
- Voivodeship: Masovian
- County: Sokołów
- Gmina: Repki

Population (approx.)
  - Total: 220

Wyrozęby-Konaty [vɨrɔˈzɛmbɨ kɔˈnatɨ] is a village in the administrative district of Gmina Repki, within Sokołów County, Masovian Voivodeship, in east-central Poland.
