= Garnek, Masovian Voivodeship =

Garnek
- Village
- Location within Poland
- Coordinates: 52°39′N 22°9′E
- Country: Poland
- Voivodeship: Masovian
- County: Sokołów
- Gmina: Ceranów

Garnek [ˈɡarnɛk] is a village in the administrative district of Gmina Ceranów, within Sokołów County, Masovian Voivodeship, in east-central Poland.
