= Kostki-Pieńki =

Village in Gmina Sabnie, Poland

- Village
- Location within Poland
- Coordinates: 52°29′31″N 22°12′41″E
- Country: Poland
- Voivodeship: Masovian
- County: Sokołów
- Gmina: Sabnie

Kostki-Pieńki [ˈkɔstki ˈpjɛɲki] is a village in the administrative district of Gmina Sabnie, within Sokołów County, Masovian Voivodeship, in east-central Poland.
