= Kobylany-Skorupki =

- Village
- Location within Poland
- Coordinates: 52°19′35″N 22°28′06″E
- Country: Poland
- Voivodeship: Masovian
- County: Sokołów
- Gmina: Repki

Kobylany-Skorupki [kɔbɨˈlanɨ skɔˈrupki] is a village in the administrative district of Gmina Repki, within Sokołów County, Masovian Voivodeship, in east-central Poland.
