= Dmochy-Rętki =

- Village
- Location within Poland
- Coordinates: 52°18′18″N 22°11′06″E
- Country: Poland
- Voivodeship: Masovian
- County: Sokołów
- Gmina: Bielany

Dmochy-Rętki [ˈdmɔxɨ ˈrɛntki] is a village in the administrative district of Gmina Bielany, within Sokołów County, Masovian Voivodeship, in east-central Poland.
