= Adolfów, Masovian Voivodeship =

Adolfów
- Village
- Location within Poland
- Coordinates: 52°39′N 22°18′E
- Country: Poland
- Voivodeship: Masovian
- County: Sokołów
- Gmina: Ceranów
- Population: 60

Adolfów [aˈdɔlfuf] is a village in the administrative district of Gmina Ceranów, within Sokołów County, Masovian Voivodeship, in east-central Poland.
