= Wymysły, Sokołów County =

Wymysły
- Village
- Location within Poland
- Coordinates: 52°30′29″N 22°15′20″E
- Country: Poland
- Voivodeship: Masovian
- County: Sokołów
- Gmina: Sabnie

Wymysły [vɨˈmɨswɨ] is a village in the administrative district of Gmina Sabnie, within Sokołów County, Masovian Voivodeship, in east-central Poland.
