= Rytele-Wszołki =

- Village
- Location within Poland
- Coordinates: 52°40′53″N 22°07′38″E
- Country: Poland
- Voivodeship: Masovian
- County: Sokołów
- Gmina: Ceranów

Rytele-Wszołki [rɨˈtɛlɛ ˈfʂɔu̯ki] is a village in the administrative district of Gmina Ceranów, within Sokołów County, Masovian Voivodeship, in east-central Poland.
