= Patrykozy =

- Village
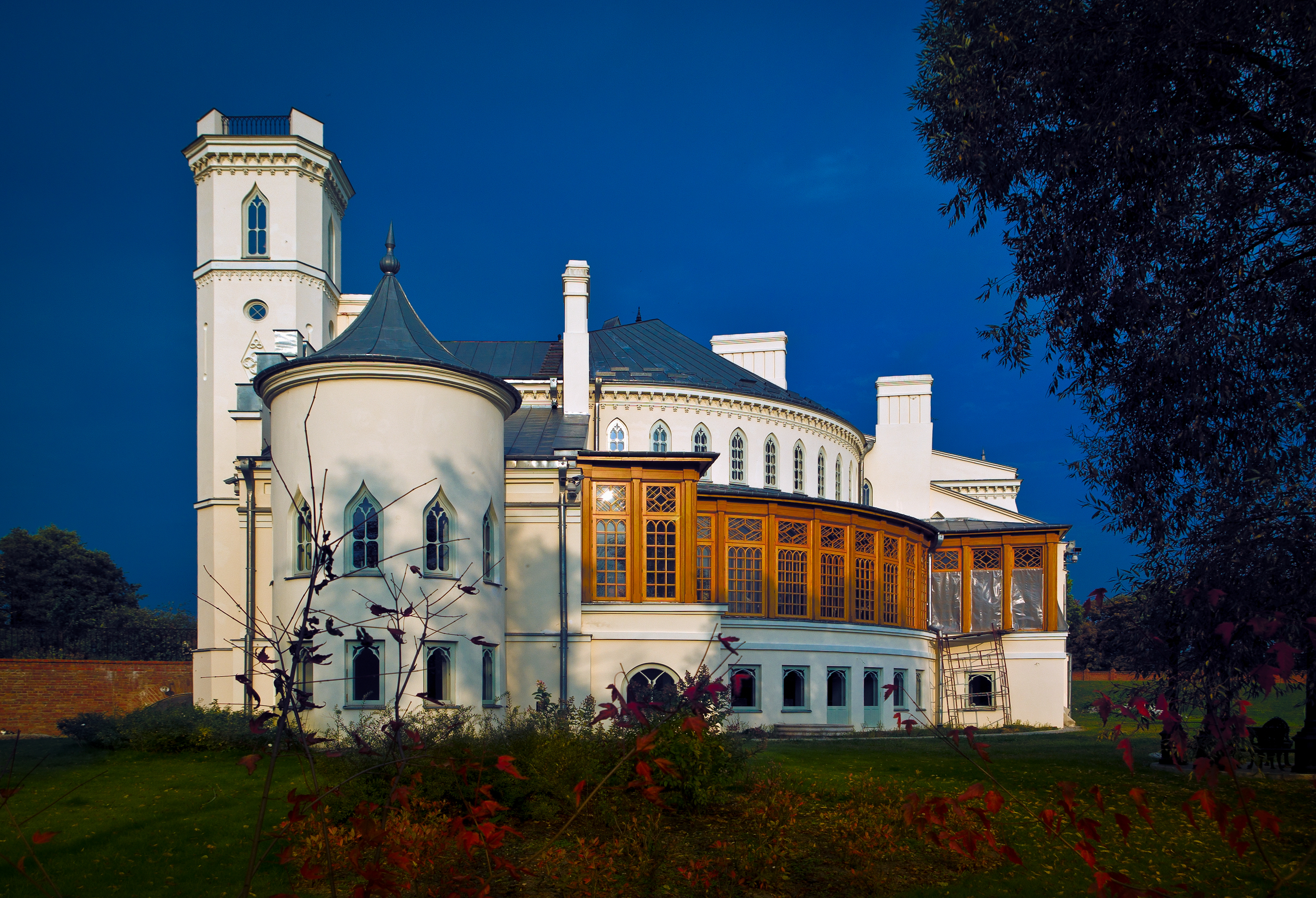
- Szydłowski Palace in Patrykozy

- Location within Poland
- Coordinates: 52°19′N 22°20′E
- Country: Poland
- Voivodeship: Masovian
- County: Sokołów
- Gmina: Bielany
- Time zone: UTC+1 (CET)
  - Summer (DST): UTC+2 (CEST)
- Vehicle registration: WSK

Patrykozy [patrɨˈkɔzɨ] is a village in the administrative district of Gmina Bielany, within Sokołów County, Masovian Voivodeship, in east-central Poland.
