= Grodzisk, Sokołów County =

Grodzisk
- Village
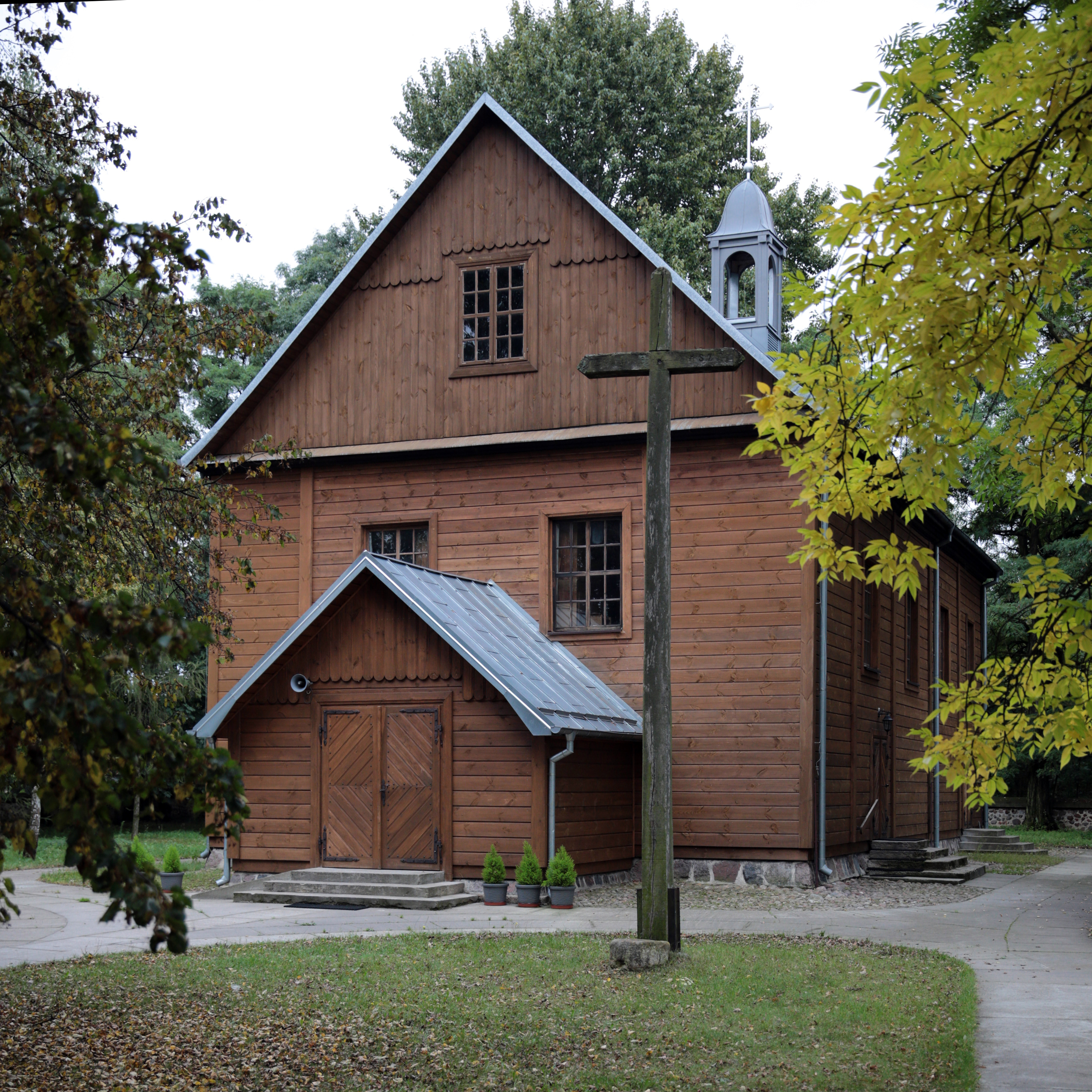

- Location within Poland
- Coordinates: 52°28′55.6″N 22°18′50.6″E
- Country: Poland
- Voivodeship: Masovian
- County: Sokołów
- Gmina: Sabnie

Grodzisk [ˈɡrɔd͡ʑisk] is a village in the administrative district of Gmina Sabnie, within Sokołów County, Masovian Voivodeship, in east-central Poland.
