= Czaple-Andrelewicze =

- Village
- Location within Poland
- Coordinates: 52°21′51.3″N 22°32′29.5″E
- Country: Poland
- Voivodeship: Masovian
- County: Sokołów
- Gmina: Repki

Czaple-Andrelewicze [ˈt͡ʂaplɛ andrɛlɛˈvit͡ʂɛ] is a village in the administrative district of Gmina Repki, within Sokołów County, Masovian Voivodeship, in east-central Poland.
