= Mołomotki =

- Village
- Location within Poland
- Coordinates: 52°23′53″N 22°27′16″E
- Country: Poland
- Voivodeship: Masovian
- County: Sokołów
- Gmina: Repki

Mołomotki [mɔwɔˈmɔtki] is a village in the administrative district of Gmina Repki, within Sokołów County, Masovian Voivodeship, in east-central Poland.
