= Kamianka, Sokołów County =

Kamianka
- Village
- Location within Poland
- Coordinates: 52°25′N 22°24′E
- Country: Poland
- Voivodeship: Masovian
- County: Sokołów
- Gmina: Repki
- Time zone: UTC+1 (CET)
  - Summer (DST): UTC+2 (CEST)

Kamianka [kaˈmjanka] is a village in the administrative district of Gmina Repki, within Sokołów County, Masovian Voivodeship, in east-central Poland.

One Polish citizen was murdered by Nazi Germany in the village during World War II.
