= Suchodół Włościański =

- Village
- Location within Poland
- Coordinates: 52°29′21″N 22°16′51″E
- Country: Poland
- Voivodeship: Masovian
- County: Sokołów
- Gmina: Sabnie

Suchodół Włościański (Polish pronunciation: [suˈxɔduw vwɔɕˈtɕaj̃skʲi]) is a village in the administrative district of Gmina Sabnie, within Sokołów County, Masovian Voivodeship, in east-central Poland.
