= Gmina Sabnie =

Gmina Sabnie Sabnie Commune
- Gmina
- Coat of arms
- Interactive map of Gmina Sabnie
- Coordinates (Sabnie): 52°31′N 22°18′E
- Country: Poland
- Voivodeship: Masovian
- County: Sokołów
- Seat: Sabnie

Area
  - Total: 107.92 km^{2} (41.67 sq mi)

Population (2013)
  - Total: 3,870
  - Density: 35.9/km^{2} (92.9/sq mi)

Gmina Sabnie is a rural gmina (administrative district) in Sokołów County, Masovian Voivodeship, in east-central Poland. Its seat is the village of Sabnie, which lies approximately 13 kilometres (8 mi) north of Sokołów Podlaski and 95 km (59 mi) east of Warsaw.

The gmina covers an area of 107.92 square kilometres (41.7 sq mi), and as of 2006 its total population is 3,941 (3,870 in 2013).

== Villages ==
Gmina Sabnie contains the villages and settlements of Chmielnik, Grodzisk, Hilarów, Hołowienki, Jadwisin, Klepki, Kolonia Hołowienki, Kolonia Kurowice, Kostki-Pieńki, Kupientyn, Kupientyn-Kolonia, Kurowice, Nieciecz Włościańska, Nieciecz-Dwór, Niewiadoma, Pieńki Suchodolskie, Sabnie, Stasin, Suchodół Szlachecki, Suchodół Włościański, Tchórznica Szlachecka, Tchórznica Włościańska, Wymysły and Zembrów.

== Neighbouring gminas ==
Gmina Sabnie is bordered by the gminas of Jabłonna Lacka, Kosów Lacki, Repki, Sokołów Podlaski and Sterdyń.
