= Błonie Duże =

- Village
- Location within Poland
- Coordinates: 52°21′N 22°17′E
- Country: Poland
- Voivodeship: Masovian
- County: Sokołów
- Gmina: Bielany

Błonie Duże [ˈbwɔɲɛ ˈduʐɛ] is a village in the administrative district of Gmina Bielany, within Sokołów County, Masovian Voivodeship, in east-central Poland.
