= Korabie =

- Village
- Location within Poland
- Coordinates: 52°21′06″N 22°10′58″E
- Country: Poland
- Voivodeship: Masovian
- County: Sokołów
- Gmina: Bielany

Korabie [kɔˈrabjɛ] is a village in the administrative district of Gmina Bielany, within Sokołów County, Masovian Voivodeship, in east-central Poland.
