= Hilarów, Sokołów County =

Hilarów
- Village
- Location within Poland
- Coordinates: 52°31′N 22°13′E
- Country: Poland
- Voivodeship: Masovian
- County: Sokołów
- Gmina: Sabnie

Hilarów [xiˈlaruf] is a village in the administrative district of Gmina Sabnie, within Sokołów County, Masovian Voivodeship, in east-central Poland.
