= Pustelnik, Sokołów County =

Pustelnik
- Village
- Location within Poland
- Coordinates: 52°38′55″N 22°14′58″E
- Country: Poland
- Voivodeship: Masovian
- County: Sokołów
- Gmina: Ceranów

Pustelnik [pusˈtɛlɲik] is a village in the administrative district of Gmina Ceranów, within Sokołów County, Masovian Voivodeship, in east-central Poland.
