= Niewiadoma, Masovian Voivodeship =

Niewiadoma
- Village
- Location within Poland
- Coordinates: 52°28′N 22°18′E
- Country: Poland
- Voivodeship: Masovian
- County: Sokołów
- Gmina: Sabnie
- Population: 100

Niewiadoma [ɲɛvjaˈdɔma] is a village in the administrative district of Gmina Sabnie, within Sokołów County, Masovian Voivodeship, in east-central Poland.
