= Księżopole-Komory =

- Village
- Location within Poland
- Coordinates: 52°22′27″N 22°20′54″E
- Country: Poland
- Voivodeship: Masovian
- County: Sokołów
- Gmina: Bielany

Księżopole-Komory [kɕɛ̃ʐɔˈpɔlɛ kɔˈmɔrɨ] is a village in the administrative district of Gmina Bielany, within Sokołów County, Masovian Voivodeship, in east-central Poland.
