= Jadwisin, Sokołów County =

Jadwisin
- Village
- Jadwisin, Poland
- Location within Poland
- Coordinates: 52°28′13″N 22°15′06″E
- Country: Poland
- Voivodeship: Masovian
- County: Sokołów
- Gmina: Sabnie

Jadwisin [jadˈviɕin] is a village in the administrative district of Gmina Sabnie, within Sokołów County, Masovian Voivodeship, in east-central Poland.
