= Wyszomierz =

Wyszomierz may refer to the following places:

- Wyszomierz, Gmina Bielany in Masovian Voivodeship (east-central Poland)
- Wyszomierz, Gmina Kosów Lacki in Masovian Voivodeship (east-central Poland)
- Wyszomierz, West Pomeranian Voivodeship (north-west Poland)
