= Błonie Małe =

- Village
- Location within Poland
- Coordinates: 52°21′N 22°19′E
- Country: Poland
- Voivodeship: Masovian
- County: Sokołów
- Gmina: Bielany

Błonie Małe [ˈbwɔɲɛ ˈmawɛ] is a village in the administrative district of Gmina Bielany, within Sokołów County, Masovian Voivodeship, in east-central Poland.
