= Kurowice, Masovian Voivodeship =

Kurowice
- Village
- Location within Poland
- Coordinates: 52°32′N 22°19′E
- Country: Poland
- Voivodeship: Masovian
- County: Sokołów
- Gmina: Sabnie
- Time zone: UTC+1 (CET)
  - Summer (DST): UTC+2 (CEST)

Kurowice [kurɔˈvit͡sɛ] is a village in the administrative district of Gmina Sabnie, within Sokołów County, Masovian Voivodeship, in east-central Poland.

Nine Polish citizens were murdered by Nazi Germany in the village during World War II.
