= Bohy, Poland =

Bohy
- Village
- Location within Poland
- Coordinates: 52°22′32″N 22°28′0″E
- Country: Poland
- Voivodeship: Masovian
- County: Sokołów
- Gmina: Repki

Bohy [ˈbɔxɨ] is a village in the administrative district of Gmina Repki, within Sokołów County, Masovian Voivodeship, in east-central Poland.
