= Sikory, Sokołów County =

Sikory
- Village
- Location within Poland
- Coordinates: 52°20′N 22°10′E
- Country: Poland
- Voivodeship: Masovian
- County: Sokołów
- Gmina: Bielany

Sikory [ɕiˈkɔrɨ] is a village in the administrative district of Gmina Bielany, within Sokołów County, Masovian Voivodeship, in east-central Poland.
