= Ostrówek, Sokołów County =

Ostrówek
- Village
- Location within Poland
- Coordinates: 52°23′05″N 22°30′52″E
- Country: Poland
- Voivodeship: Masovian
- County: Sokołów
- Gmina: Repki
- Time zone: UTC+1 (CET)
  - Summer (DST): UTC+2 (CEST)

Ostrówek [ɔsˈtruvɛk] is a village in the administrative district of Gmina Repki, within Sokołów County, Masovian Voivodeship, in east-central Poland.

One Polish citizen was murdered by Nazi Germany in the village during World War II.
