= Sawice-Wieś =

- Village
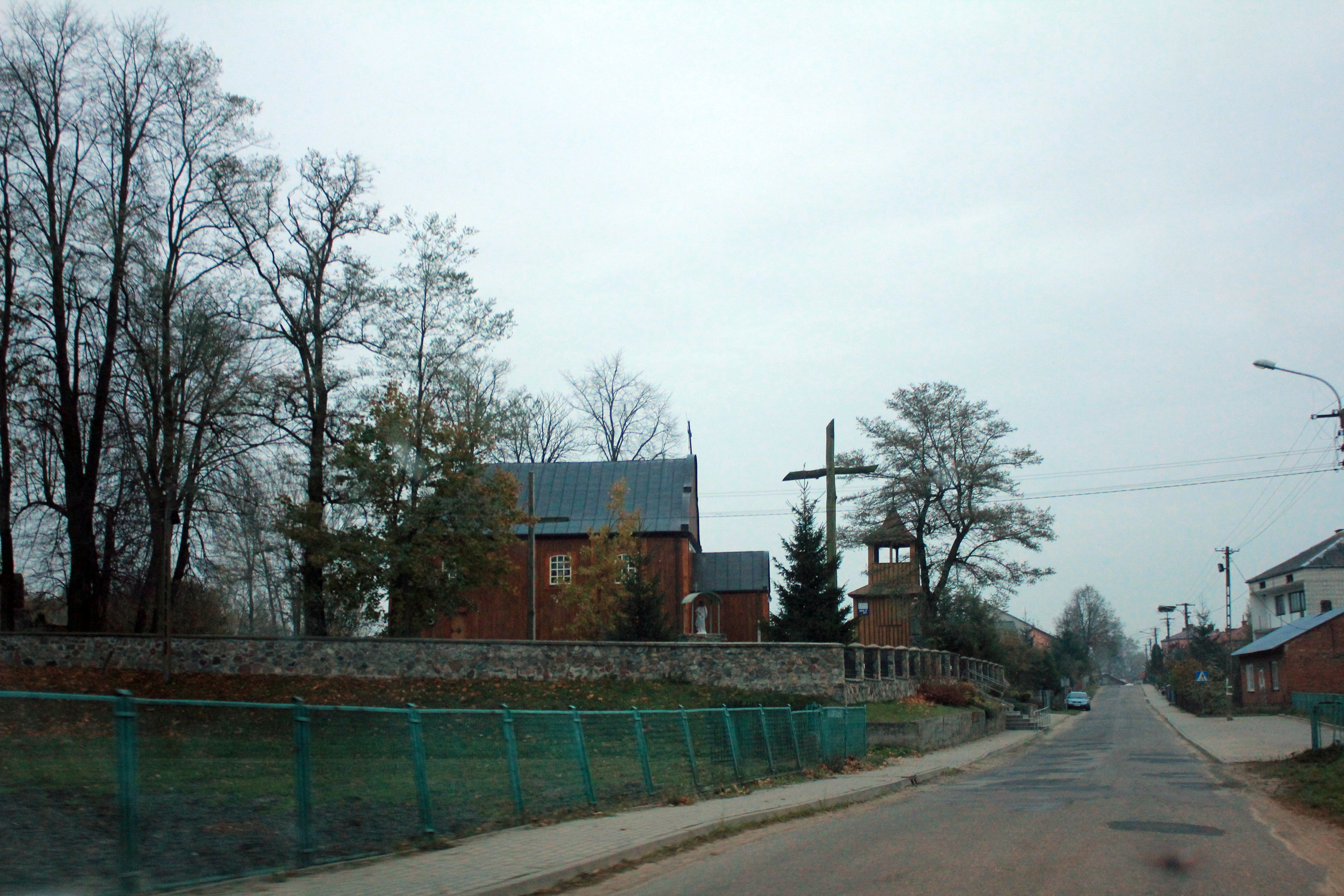

- Location within Poland
- Coordinates: 52°20′30″N 22°28′51″E
- Country: Poland
- Voivodeship: Masovian
- County: Sokołów
- Gmina: Repki

Sawice-Wieś [saˈvit͡sɛ ˈvjɛɕ] is a village in the administrative district of Gmina Repki, within Sokołów County, Masovian Voivodeship, in east-central Poland.
