= Kolonia Hołowienki =

Village in Gmina Sabnie, Poland

- Village
- Location within Poland
- Coordinates: 52°31′27″N 22°15′26″E
- Country: Poland
- Voivodeship: Masovian
- County: Sokołów
- Gmina: Sabnie

Kolonia Hołowienki [kɔˈlɔɲa xɔwɔˈvjɛnki] is a village in the administrative district of Gmina Sabnie, within Sokołów County, Masovian Voivodeship, in east-central Poland.
