= Ostrowiec, Sokołów County =

Ostrowiec
- Village
- Location within Poland
- Coordinates: 52°22′N 22°29′E
- Country: Poland
- Voivodeship: Masovian
- County: Sokołów
- Gmina: Repki

Ostrowiec [ɔsˈtrɔvjɛt͡s] is a village in the administrative district of Gmina Repki, within Sokołów County, Masovian Voivodeship, in east-central Poland.
