= Hołowienki =

- Village
- Location within Poland
- Coordinates: 52°30′N 22°17′E
- Country: Poland
- Voivodeship: Masovian
- County: Sokołów
- Gmina: Sabnie

Hołowienki [xɔwɔˈvjɛnki] is a village in the administrative district of Gmina Sabnie, within Sokołów County, Masovian Voivodeship, in east-central Poland.

== Notable people ==
- Kazimierz Romaniuk (1927 - 2025), Polish bishop, bishop of Praga
