= Ruda-Kolonia, Masovian Voivodeship =

Ruda-Kolonia
- Village
- Location within Poland
- Coordinates: 52°19′58″N 22°17′03″E
- Country: Poland
- Voivodeship: Masovian
- County: Sokołów
- Gmina: Bielany

Ruda-Kolonia [ˈruda kɔˈlɔɲa] is a village in the administrative district of Gmina Bielany, within Sokołów County, Masovian Voivodeship, in east-central Poland.
