= Tchórznica Włościańska =

- Village
- Location within Poland
- Coordinates: 52°29′42″N 22°22′38″E
- Country: Poland
- Voivodeship: Masovian
- County: Sokołów
- Gmina: Sabnie

Tchórznica Włościańska (Polish pronunciation: [txuʐˈɲitsa vwɔɕˈtɕaj̃ska]) is a village in the administrative district of Gmina Sabnie, within Sokołów County, Masovian Voivodeship, in east-central Poland.
