= Józin, Sokołów County =

Village in Gmina Repki, Poland

Józin
- Village
- Location within Poland
- Coordinates: 52°25′46″N 22°23′14″E
- Country: Poland
- Voivodeship: Masovian
- County: Sokołów
- Gmina: Repki

Józin [ˈjuʑin] is a village in the administrative district of Gmina Repki, within Sokołów County, Masovian Voivodeship, in east-central Poland.
