= Gmina Repki =

Gmina Repki Repki Commune
- Gmina
- Interactive map of Gmina Repki
- Coordinates (Repki): 52°23′N 22°23′E
- Country: Poland
- Voivodeship: Masovian
- County: Sokołów
- Seat: Repki

Area
  - Total: 168.79 km^{2} (65.17 sq mi)

Population (2013)
  - Total: 5,576
  - Density: 33.04/km^{2} (85.56/sq mi)
- Website: http://repki.cba.pl

Gmina Repki is a rural gmina (administrative district) in Sokołów County, Masovian Voivodeship, in east-central Poland. Its seat is the village of Repki, which lies approximately 10 kilometres (6 mi) south-east of Sokołów Podlaski and 95 km (59 mi) north-east of Warsaw.

The gmina covers an area of 168.79 square kilometres (65.2 sq mi), and as of 2006 its total population is 5,809 (5,576 in 2013).

== Villages ==
Gmina Repki contains the villages and settlements of Baczki, Bałki, Bohy, Borychów, Czaple-Andrelewicze, Czaple-Kolonia, Gałki, Jasień, Józin, Kamianka, Kanabród, Karskie, Kobylany Górne, Kobylany-Skorupki, Liszki, Mołomotki, Mołomotki-Dwór, Ostrówek, Ostrowiec, Remiszew Duży, Remiszew Mały, Repki, Rogów, Rudniki, Sawice-Bronisze, Sawice-Dwór, Sawice-Wieś, Skorupki, Skrzeszew, Skrzeszew E, Skwierczyn-Dwór, Skwierczyn-Wieś, Smuniew, Szkopy, Wasilew Skrzeszewski, Wasilew Szlachecki, Wierzbice Górne, Włodki, Wyrozęby-Konaty, Wyrozęby-Podawce, Zawady and Żółkwy.

== Neighbouring gminas ==
Gmina Repki is bordered by the gminas of Bielany, Drohiczyn, Jabłonna Lacka, Korczew, Paprotnia, Sabnie and Sokołów Podlaski.
