= Włodki, Masovian Voivodeship =

Włodki
- Village
- Location within Poland
- Coordinates: 52°21′00″N 22°22′00″E
- Country: Poland
- Voivodeship: Masovian
- County: Sokołów
- Gmina: Repki

Włodki [ˈvwɔtki] is a village in the administrative district of Gmina Repki, within Sokołów County, Masovian Voivodeship, in east-central Poland.
