= Długie Grzymki =

- Village
- Location within Poland
- Coordinates: 52°40′18″N 22°14′09″E
- Country: Poland
- Voivodeship: Masovian
- County: Sokołów
- Gmina: Ceranów

Długie Grzymki [ˈdwuɡʲɛ ˈɡʐɨmki] is a village in Gmina Ceranów, Sokołów County, Masovian Voivodeship, Poland.
