= Długie Kamieńskie =

- Village
- Location within Poland
- Coordinates: 52°40′N 22°16′E
- Country: Poland
- Voivodeship: Masovian
- County: Sokołów
- Gmina: Ceranów

Długie Kamieńskie [ˈdwuɡʲɛ kaˈmjɛɲskʲɛ] is a village in the administrative district of Gmina Ceranów, within Sokołów County, Masovian Voivodeship, in east-central Poland.
