= Długie Grodzieckie =

Village in Gmina Ceranów, Poland

- Village
- Location within Poland
- Coordinates: 52°41′03″N 22°13′29″E
- Country: Poland
- Voivodeship: Masovian
- County: Sokołów
- Gmina: Ceranów

Długie Grodzieckie [ˈdwuɡʲɛ ɡrɔˈd͡ʑɛt͡skʲɛ] is a village in the administrative district of Gmina Ceranów, within Sokołów County, Masovian Voivodeship, in east-central Poland.
