= Gmina Ceranów =

Gmina Ceranów Ceranów Commune
- Gmina
- Interactive map of Gmina Ceranów
- Coordinates (Ceranów): 52°38′N 22°14′E
- Country: Poland
- Voivodeship: Masovian
- County: Sokołów
- Seat: Ceranów

Area
  - Total: 110.83 km^{2} (42.79 sq mi)

Population (2013)
  - Total: 2,331
  - Density: 21.03/km^{2} (54.47/sq mi)

Gmina Ceranów is a rural gmina (administrative district) in Sokołów County, Masovian Voivodeship, in east-central Poland. Its seat is the village of Ceranów, which lies approximately 26 kilometres (16 mi) north of Sokołów Podlaski and 96 km (60 mi) north-east of Warsaw.

The gmina covers an area of 110.83 square kilometres (42.8 sq mi), and as of 2006 its total population is 2,448 (2,331 in 2013).

== Villages ==
Gmina Ceranów contains the villages and settlements of Adolfów, Ceranów, Długie Grodzieckie, Długie Grzymki, Długie Kamieńskie, Garnek, Lubiesza, Natolin, Noski, Olszew, Przewóz Nurski, Pustelnik, Radość, Rytele Suche, Rytele-Olechny, Rytele-Wszołki, Wólka Nadbużna, Wólka Rytelska, Wszebory and Zawady.

== Neighbouring gminas ==
Gmina Ceranów is bordered by the gminas of Kosów Lacki, Małkinia Górna, Nur, Sterdyń and Zaręby Kościelne.
