= Zawady, Gmina Repki =

Zawady
- Village
- Location within Poland
- Coordinates: 52°21′29″N 22°22′08″E
- Country: Poland
- Voivodeship: Masovian
- County: Sokołów
- Gmina: Repki

Zawady [zaˈvadɨ] is a village in the administrative district of Gmina Repki, within Sokołów County, Masovian Voivodeship, in east-central Poland.
