= Klepki =

- Village
- Location within Poland
- Coordinates: 52°29′N 22°15′E
- Country: Poland
- Voivodeship: Masovian
- County: Sokołów
- Gmina: Sabnie

Klepki [ˈklɛpki] is a village in the administrative district of Gmina Sabnie, within Sokołów County, Masovian Voivodeship, in east-central Poland.
