= Patrykozy-Kolonia =

- Village
- Location within Poland
- Coordinates: 52°19′47″N 22°21′25″E
- Country: Poland
- Voivodeship: Masovian
- County: Sokołów
- Gmina: Bielany

Patrykozy-Kolonia [patrɨˈkɔzɨ kɔˈlɔɲa] is a village in the administrative district of Gmina Bielany, within Sokołów County, Masovian Voivodeship, in east-central Poland.
