= Zawady, Gmina Ceranów =

Zawady
- Village
- Location within Poland
- Coordinates: 52°35′54″N 22°13′15″E
- Country: Poland
- Voivodeship: Masovian
- County: Sokołów
- Gmina: Ceranów

Zawady [zaˈvadɨ] is a village in the administrative district of Gmina Ceranów, within Sokołów County, Masovian Voivodeship, in east-central Poland.
