= Grzegorz Skwierczyński =

Polish politician

Grzegorz Krzysztof Skwierczyński

member of Sejm 2005–2007
- In office 25 September 2005 – 2007

Personal details
- Born: 1974 (age 51–52)
- Party: Samoobrona

Grzegorz Krzysztof Skwierczyński (born 25 July 1974 in Siedlce) is a Polish politician. He was elected to the Sejm on 25 September 2005, getting 6,963 votes in 18 Siedlce district as a candidate from the Samoobrona Rzeczpospolitej Polskiej list.

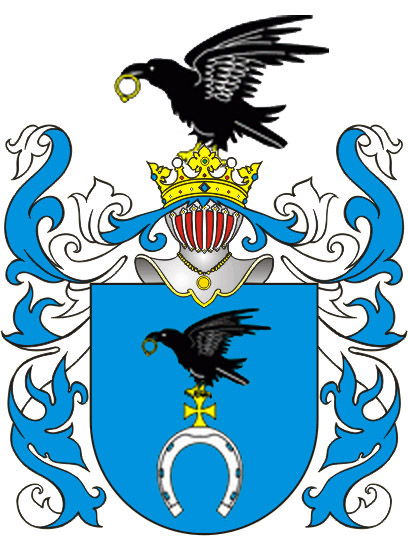
Ślepowron coat of arms

== See also ==
- Members of Polish Sejm 2005–2007
- Skwierczyński
- Ślepowron coat of arms
