= Bielany, Sokołów County =

Bielany
- Village
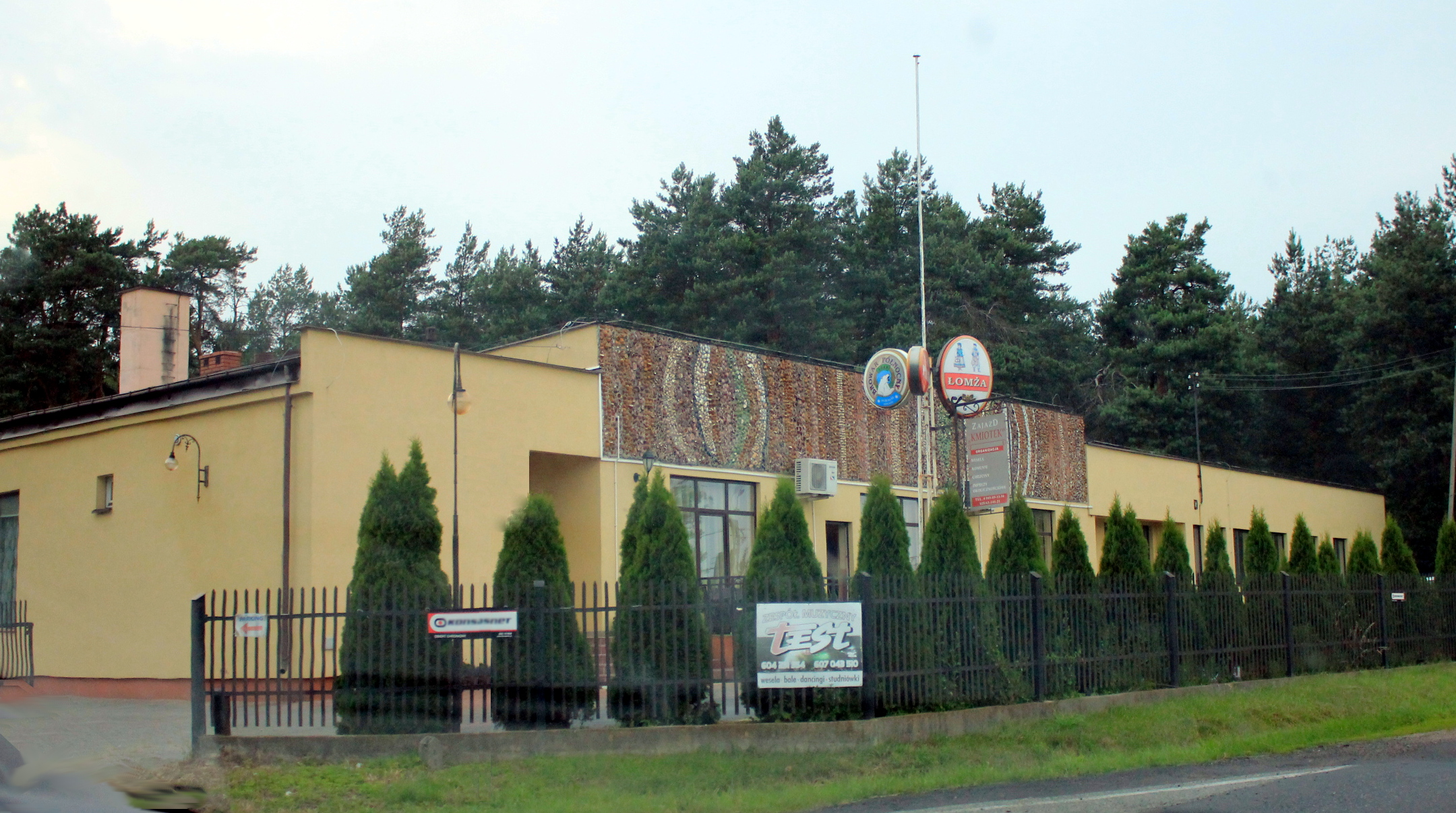

- Location within Poland
- Coordinates: 52°20′30″N 22°14′45″E
- Country: Poland
- Voivodeship: Masovian
- County: Sokołów
- Gmina: Bielany

Population
  - Total: 180
- Time zone: UTC+1 (CET)
  - Summer (DST): UTC+2 (CEST)

Bielany [bjɛˈlanɨ] is a village in Sokołów County, Masovian Voivodeship, in east-central Poland. It is the seat of the gmina (administrative district) called Gmina Bielany.

Nine Polish citizens were murdered by Nazi Germany in Bielany-Żyłaki during World War II.
