= Wyszomierz, Gmina Bielany =

Wyszomierz
- Village
- Location within Poland
- Coordinates: 52°19′20″N 22°17′02″E
- Country: Poland
- Voivodeship: Masovian
- County: Sokołów
- Gmina: Bielany
- Population (approx.): 100

Wyszomierz [vɨˈʂɔmjɛʂ] is a village in the administrative district of Gmina Bielany, within Sokołów County, Masovian Voivodeship, in east-central Poland.
