= Skwarczyński =

Skwarczyński (masculine), Skwarczyńska (feminine) is a Polish surname. Notable people with the surname include:

- Adam Skwarczyński (1886–1934), Polish independence activist and politician
- Stanisław Skwarczyński
- Stefania Skwarczyńska

== See also ==
- Skwierczyński
