= Skwierczyn-Wieś =

- Village
- Location within Poland
- Coordinates: 52°21′N 22°25′E
- Country: Poland
- Voivodeship: Masovian
- County: Sokołów
- Gmina: Repki

Skwierczyn-Wieś [ˈskfjɛrt͡ʂɨn ˈvjɛɕ] is a village in the administrative district of Gmina Repki, within Sokołów County, Masovian Voivodeship, in east-central Poland.
