= Ceranów =

- Village
- Location within Poland
- Coordinates: 52°38′N 22°14′E
- Country: Poland
- Voivodeship: Masovian
- County: Sokołów
- Gmina: Ceranów
- Population: 810
- Postal Code: 08-322
- Area Code: (+48) 25
- Vehicle registration: WSK
- Website: www.ceranow.pl

Ceranów [t͡sɛˈranuf] is a village in Sokołów County, Masovian Voivodeship, in east-central Poland. It is the seat of the gmina (administrative district) called Gmina Ceranów.
