= Zembrów =

- Village
- Location within Poland
- Coordinates: 52°32′N 22°18′E
- Country: Poland
- Voivodeship: Masovian
- County: Sokołów
- Gmina: Sabnie
- Population: 338

Zembrów [ˈzɛmbruf] is a village in the administrative district of Gmina Sabnie, within Sokołów County, Masovian Voivodeship, in east-central Poland.

Zembrów belonged to a family whose two members in the second half of the 15th century held the office of judge in Drohicki.

The Zembrowski family began with Stanisław Zawisza. He married the widow of Mikołaj Sokołowski, the owner of Sokołów, who died before 1481. He became a judge in Drohica. In 1486, together with his wife, he founded a church in Zembrów. The Zembrowski family - owners of the village in the 16th and 17th centuries - came from him. Lubicz was their coat of arms.

- Area in hectares: 519
- Number of farms: 119
- Number of residential buildings: 96

Currently, the town of Zembrów has 338 inhabitants. It is situated on the national road No. 63.
