= Repki, Sokołów County =

Repki
- Village
- Location within Poland
- Coordinates: 52°23′N 22°23′E
- Country: Poland
- Voivodeship: Masovian
- County: Sokołów
- Gmina: Repki
- Website: http://gminarepki.cba.pl

Repki [ˈrɛpki] is a village in Sokołów County, Masovian Voivodeship, in east-central Poland. It is the seat of the gmina (administrative district) called Gmina Repki.

The village is of medieval origin, the first surviving written record of it dating from 1492. Municipal status was granted in 1864.
