= Przemysław Skwirczyński =

Polish cinematographer

- Born: 3 November 1952 (age 73); Lublin, Poland
- Education: National Film School in Łódź
- Occupation: Cinematographer
- Awards: Medal for Merit to Culture – Gloria Artis

Przemysław Skwirczyński (Polish pronunciation: [pʂɛˈmɨswaf skfirˈt͡ʂɨɲskʲi]; born November 3, 1952, in Lublin in Poland) is a Polish cinematographer.

He graduated from the National Film School in Łódź in 1978 and gained the diploma in 1981.

He is the son of Jerzy Skwirczyński and Wanda Skwirczyński (née Waryszak) and is married to Krystyna Ptak, the sister of another Polish cinematographer, Krzysztof Ptak. They have one son, Przemysław.

== Filmography ==
Source: FilmPolski

- Książę (1981)
- Hamadria (1981)
- ... jestem przeciw (1985)
- Maskarada (1986)
- Rykowisko (1986)
- Stan strachu (1989)
- Niech żyje miłość (1991)
- Warszawa. Année 5703 (Eng: Warsaw - Year 5703) (1992)
- Tragarz puchu (1992)
- Wyliczanka (1994)
- Deborah (1995)
- Deszczowy żołnierz (1996)
- Pułapka (Eng: A Trap) (1997)
- Pokój na czarno (2001)
- Marzenia do spełnienia (2002)

== Awards ==
- The Bronze Medal for Merit to Culture – Gloria Artis (2025)
