= Sabnie =

- Village
- Location within Poland
- Coordinates: 52°31′N 22°18′E
- Country: Poland
- Voivodeship: Masovian
- County: Sokołów
- Gmina: Sabnie

Sabnie [ˈsabɲɛ] is a village in Sokołów County, Masovian Voivodeship, in east-central Poland. It is the seat of the gmina (administrative district) called Gmina Sabnie.
