= Sokołów Podlaski =

Town in Masovian Voivodeship, Poland

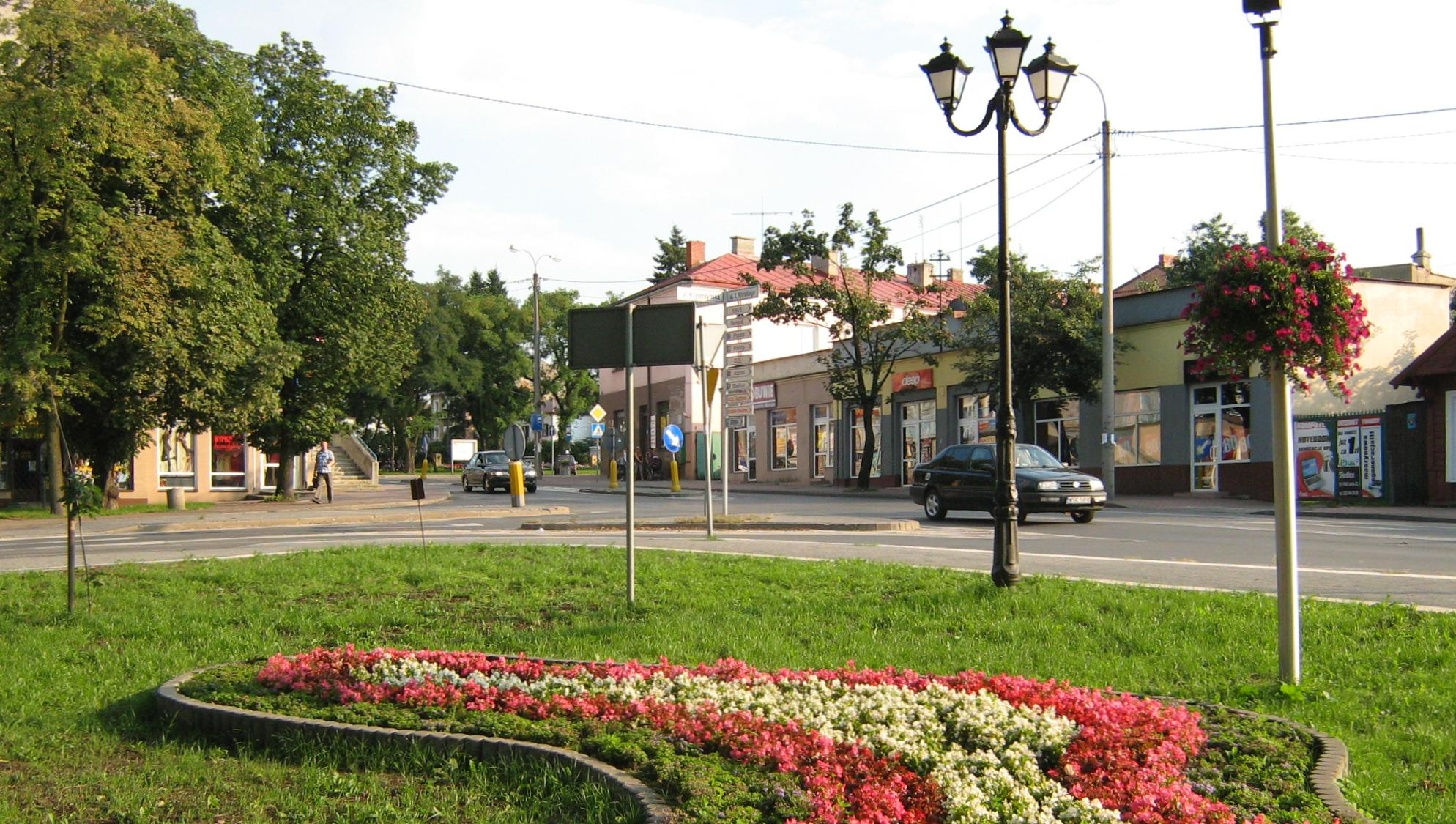
- Town center

- Flag Coat of arms

- Location within Poland
- Coordinates: 52°24′24″N 22°14′47″E
- Country: Poland
- Voivodeship: Masovian
- County: Sokołów
- Gmina: Sokołów Podlaski (urban gmina)
- Town rights: 1424

Government
  - Mayor: Iwona Kublik (KO)

Area
  - Total: 17.5 km^{2} (6.8 sq mi)

Population (2019)
  - Total: 18,945
  - Density: 1,080/km^{2} (2,800/sq mi)
- Time zone: UTC+1 (CET)
  - Summer (DST): UTC+2 (CEST)
- Postal code: 08-300, 08–301
- Area code: +48 86
- Car plates: WSK
- Website: http://www.sokolowpodl.pl

Sokołów Podlaski [sɔˈkɔwuf pɔˈdlaskʲi] is a town in Poland, in Masovian Voivodeship, about 80 kilometres (50 miles) east of Warsaw. The town lies on the Cetynia river, in the historical region of Podlachia and is the capital of Sokołów County. The first settlement was in the 6th century and the town received its charter in 1424. The population in 2004 was 18,434 (18,481 in 2010 and 18,720 in 2013).

== History ==
=== Middle Ages and early modern era ===
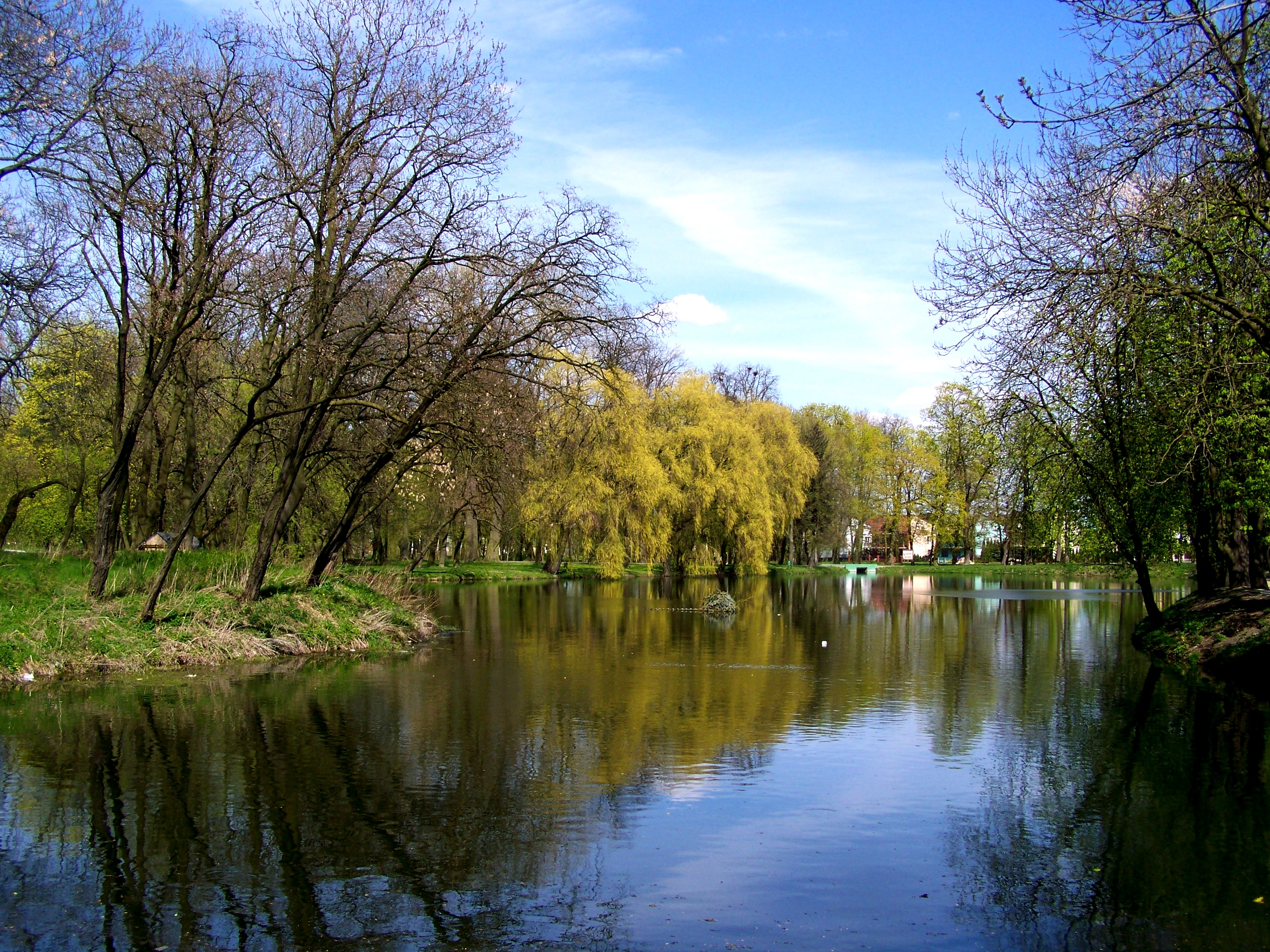
A pond in Sokołów Podlaski

The beginnings of settlement in this area date back to 6th century AD. The Sokołów area belongs to that part of Podlachia, which, due to its location, was a typical settler outpost. This area in early Medieval time was a scene of the feudal fights between the Polish and Ruthenian states, the Teutonic Knights, Yotvingians and Lithuanians. Political history of this land strongly influenced its cultural development and progress of colonisation.

Archaeological research to determinate the cultural and ethnic structure of the settlements discovered numerous archaeological sites from the early Middle Ages in the area, which allowed scientists to accurately reproduce the phases of colonisation process and the character of defensive and residential building structures of the settlements. The archaeologists found evidence of settlements in the area dating from 6th and 7th centuries. Ceramics, iron fittings, buckles, beads, staples and numerous items of burial equipment testify about the culture, customs and rituals celebrated to honour the dead. The study confirmed that in a place of old Russian and Polish settlements in the Cetynia river valley, as a result of gradual colonisation, new settlement at Sokołów was established.

Sokołów Podlaski received town rights in 1424 from the Grand Duke of Lithuania Vytautas. In 1508, Stanisław Kiszka became the new owner of the town. Administratively Sokołów was part of the Podlaskie Voivodeship of the Lesser Poland Province of the Polish Crown. In 1580, King Stephen Báthory visited Sokołów. Sokołów belonged to Kiszka until 1592, when it was passed to the Radziwiłł family. For Sokołów it was a time of the greatest prosperity in its history, uninterrupted until the Swedish invasion in the middle of the 17th century. During the war with Sweden the town was significantly damaged. In 1657 Rakoczy's army burned down the town together with surrounding farms. During the Reformation, the town was one of the strongest centers of Arianism in Podlachia.

In 1668, Jan Krasiński became the new owner of the town. After the second half of the 18th century, the town belonged to the Ogiński family. Under their rule craftsmanship quickly developed in Sokołów. Michał Kleofas Ogiński brought French craftsmen who started the production of silk scarves, hats, rugs, linen and Slutsk sashes.

=== Late modern era ===
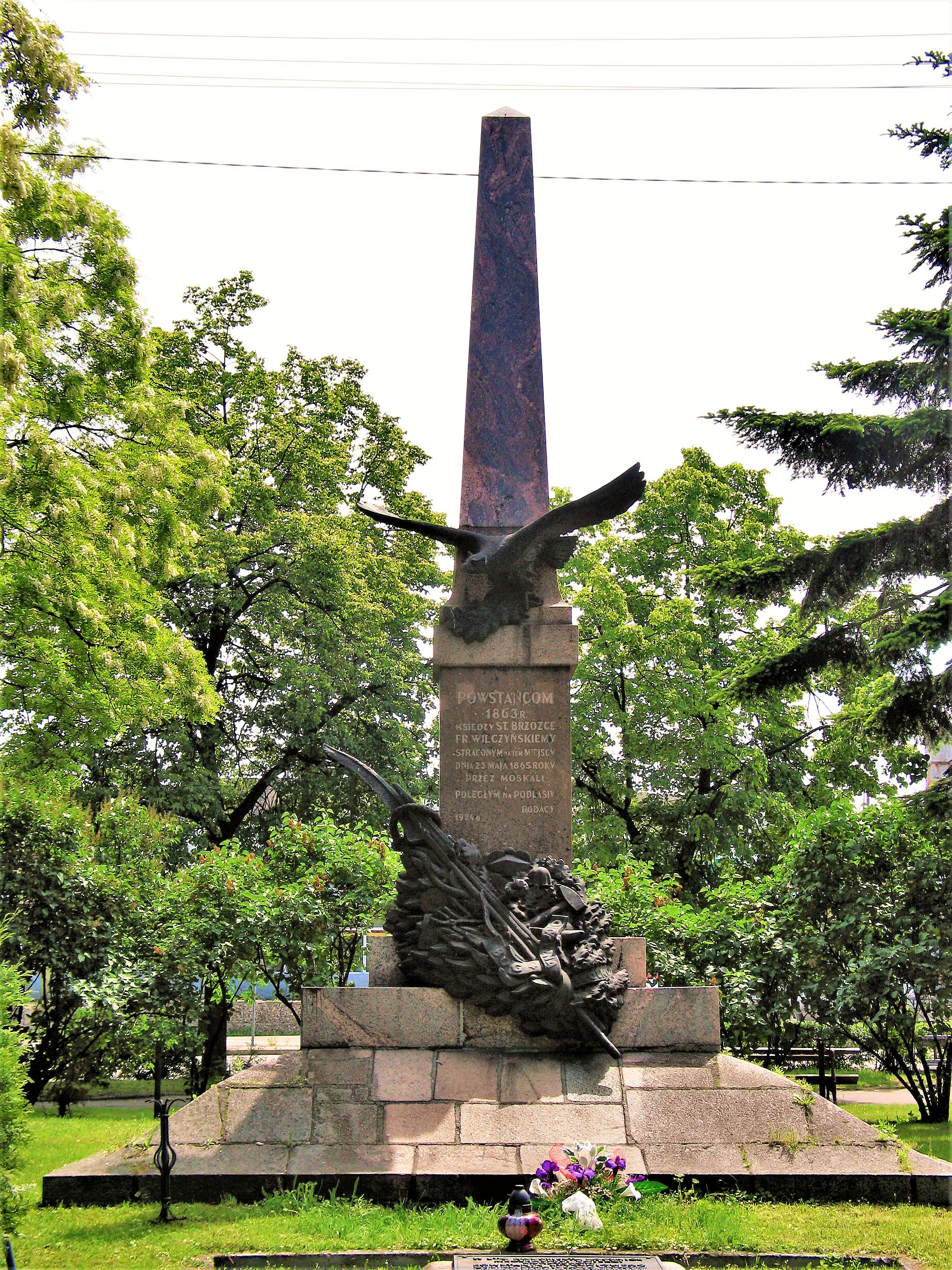
Monument at the place of the execution of Polish insurgents by the Russians in 1865

After the Third Partition of Poland in 1795, Sokołów was annexed by Austria. After the Polish victory in the Austro-Polish War of 1809, it became part of the short-lived Polish Duchy of Warsaw, and after the duchy's dissolution in 1815, it became part of newly established Congress Poland, later on forcibly annexed by Russia. In 1833, the town was purchased from Michał Kleofas Ogiński by local landowner Karol Kobyloński, who 10 years later sold it to Elżbieta Hirschman. The new owner in 1845 established the sugar factory "Elżbietów" in Przeździatka (today on the western outskirts of Sokołów Podlaski) and in 1890, the factory employed 600 workers. The sugar factory played an important role for the development of the town and local agriculture.

During the January Uprising, local priest Stanisław Brzóska became a famous leader of the Polish resistance against Russian rule. He was arrested, sentenced by the tsarist authorities to death by hanging, and executed in the town centre on 23 May 1865. In 1925, a granite monument was erected as a memorial at the site of Brzóska's execution.

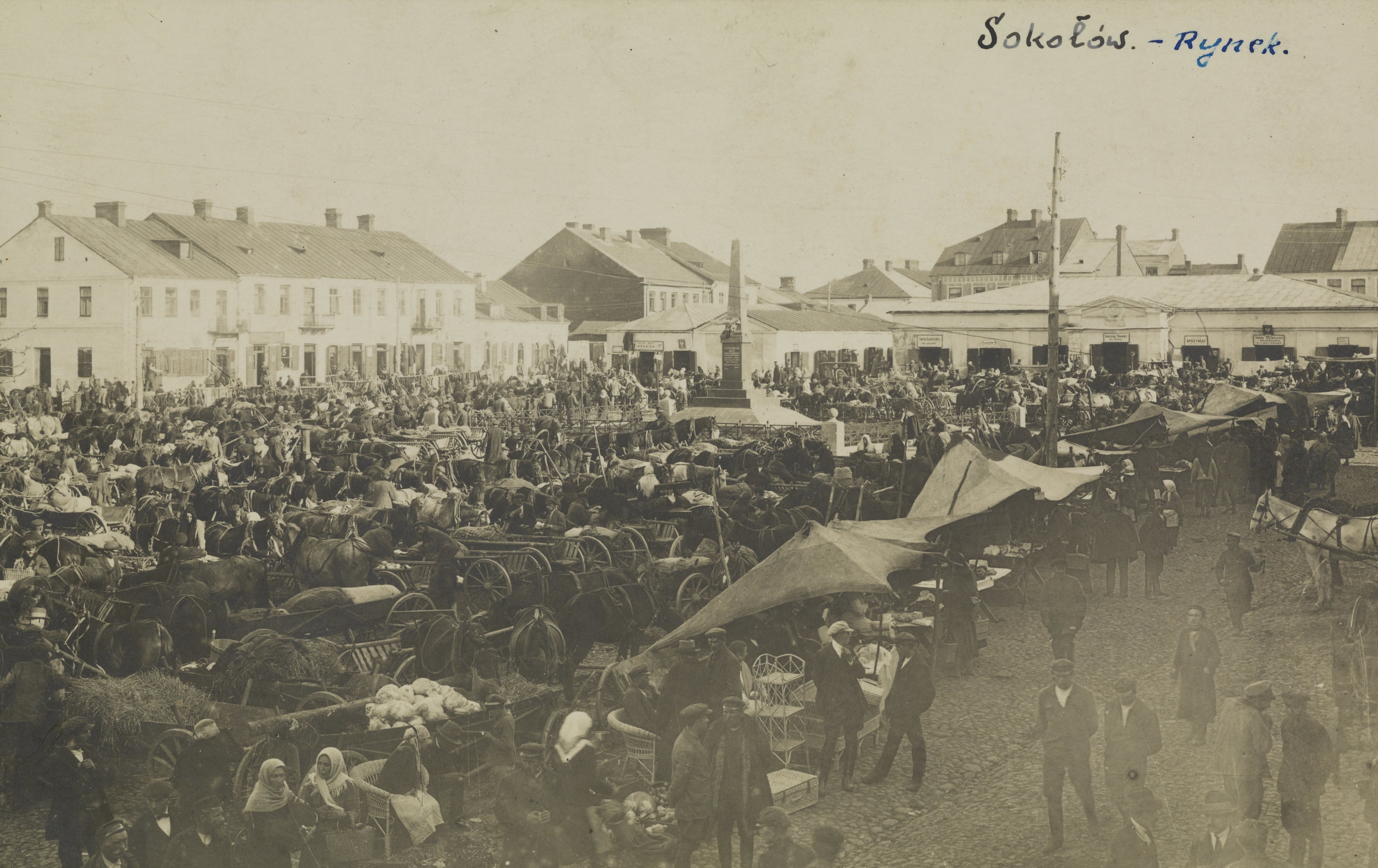
Market in Sokołów in the early 20th century

In 1867, Sokołów became the property of the state and the district office was established there. In 1878, Jan Walery Jędrzejewicz had an astronomical observatory in Sokołów. In 1887, after the construction of the railway line, the town became an important communication link. Between 1845–1890, the population of the town doubled, mostly thanks to immigrants, the majority of which were Jews, who, being artisans, craftsmen and merchants, made a great contribution to the further development of the town. During this period new factories were opened in addition to the sugar factory. In 1915, during World War I, the Germans entered the town, ending the period of Russian rule, and the three-year period of German occupation began. Sokołów became part of Poland again in 1918, after the country declared independence.

=== World War II ===
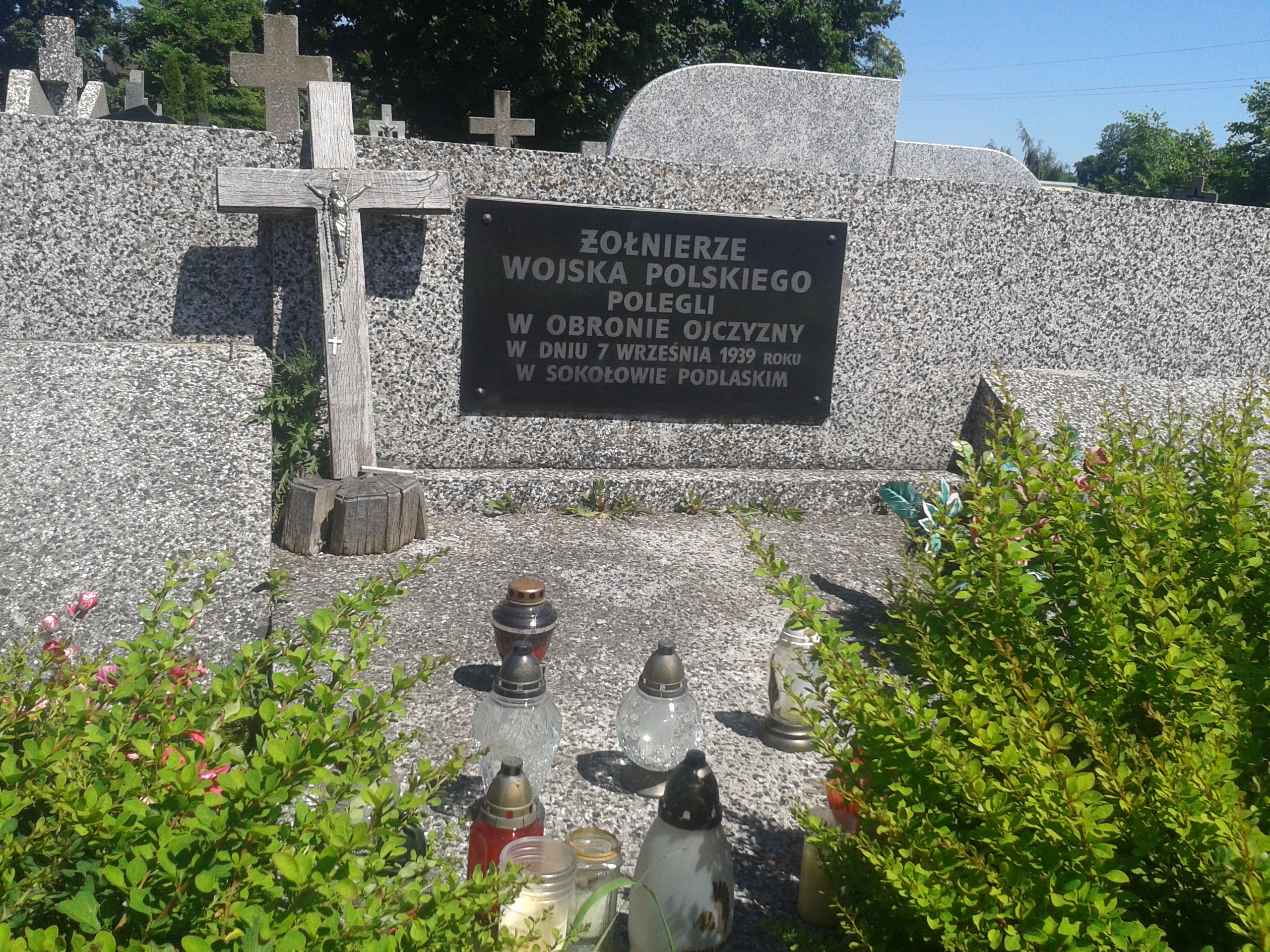
Grave of Polish soldiers killed during the German invasion of Poland in September 1939

Following the German-Soviet invasion of Poland, which started World War II in September 1939, the town was occupied by Germany. Sokołów suffered heavy losses. As a result of the war, 30% of residential and 70% of official buildings were destroyed and the population was drastically reduced. Over a dozen Poles who were either born, educated or lived in Sokołów Podlaski, were murdered by the Russians in the Katyn massacre in 1940. With the beginning of German occupation, many Jews fled. For those who stayed, in August 1941, German authorities created a ghetto, which existed until the end of September 1942. A significant number of the Jewish population were killed in the ghetto and others transported to the Treblinka extermination camp.

The Polish resistance was active in Sokołów Podlaski; it carried out sabotage operations, established a dedicated organization to provide aid to prisoners of war and took part in the Operation Tempest in 1944. The town was liberated on 8 August 1944.

=== Post-war Poland ===
Between 1951 and 1974, the electromechanical, chemical and furniture industries developed significantly. In 1975 a meat processing company was established, which over time, as Sokołów, became one of the largest companies in the Polish meat industry.

== Transport ==
Sokołów Podlaski lies on the intersection of national roads 63 and 62.

The nearest railway station is in the town of Siedlce to the south.

== Notable residents ==
- Zofia Kielan-Jaworowska (1925–2015), paleobiologist
- Joseph Rubenstein and Fannie Turek Rutkowski, parents of Jack Ruby, who murdered Lee Harvey Oswald.
