= Sokołów County =

Sokołów County Powiat sokołowski
- County

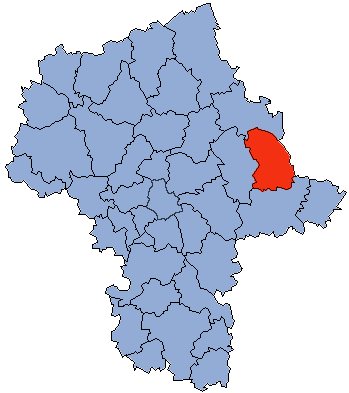
- Location within the voivodeship

- Division into gminas
- Coordinates (Sokołów Podlaski): 52°24′24″N 22°14′47″E
- Country: Poland
- Voivodeship: Masovian
- Seat: Sokołów Podlaski
- Gminas: Total 9 (incl. 1 urban): Sokołów Podlaski; Gmina Bielany; Gmina Ceranów; Gmina Jabłonna Lacka; Gmina Kosów Lacki; Gmina Repki; Gmina Sabnie; Gmina Sokołów Podlaski; Gmina Sterdyń

Area
  - Total: 1,131.42 km^{2} (436.84 sq mi)

Population (2019)
  - Total: 53,992
  - Density: 47.721/km^{2} (123.60/sq mi)
  - Urban: 21,035
  - Rural: 32,957
- Car plates: WSK
- Website: www.powiat-sokolowski.pl

Sokołów County (Polish: powiat sokołowski) is a powiat (a unit of territorial administration and local government in Poland) in Masovian Voivodeship, east-central Poland. It came into being on January 1, 1999, as a result of the Polish local government reforms passed in 1998. Its administrative seat and largest town is Sokołów Podlaski, which lies 88 kilometres (55 mi) east of Warsaw. The only other town in the county is Kosów Lacki, lying 23 km (14 mi) north of Sokołów Podlaski.

The county covers an area of 1,131.42 square kilometres (436.84 sq mi). As of 2019 its total population is 53,992, out of which the population of Sokołów Podlaski is 18,946, that of Kosów Lacki is 2,089, and the rural population is 32,957.

== Neighbouring counties ==
Sokołów County is bordered by Ostrów County and Wysokie Mazowieckie County to the north, Siemiatycze County to the east, Siedlce County to the south, and Węgrów County to the west.

== Administrative divisions ==
The county is subdivided into nine gminas (one urban, one urban-rural and seven rural). These are listed in the following table, in descending order of population.

Gmina	Type	Area (km^{2})	Population (2019)	Seat
Sokołów Podlaski	urban	17.5	18,946	
Gmina Sokołów Podlaski	rural	137.2	5,987	Sokołów Podlaski *
Gmina Kosów Lacki	urban-rural	200.2	5,970	Kosów Lacki
Gmina Repki	rural	168.8	5,212	Repki
Gmina Jabłonna Lacka	rural	149.4	4,460	Jabłonna Lacka
Gmina Sterdyń	rural	130.0	3,921	Sterdyń
Gmina Sabnie	rural	107.9	3,667	Sabnie
Gmina Bielany	rural	109.6	3,628	Bielany
Gmina Ceranów	rural	110.8	2,201	Ceranów
* seat not part of the gmina
