= Treblinka labor camp =

German Nazi labor camp

- Arbeitslager
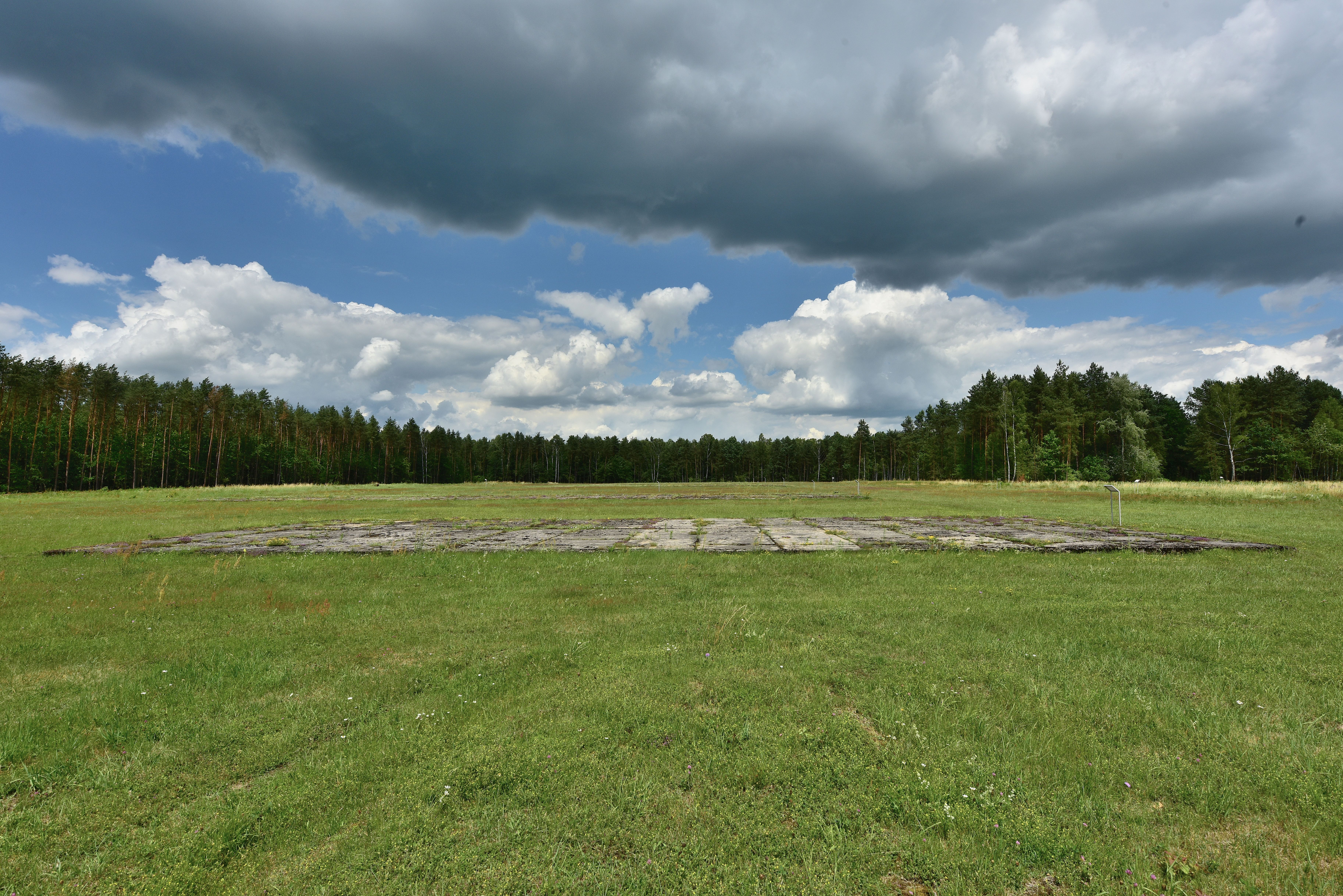
- Site of the former camp

- Location within Poland
- Coordinates: 52°37′03″N 22°02′25″E
- Other names: Der SS- und Polizeiführer im Distrikt Warschau Arbeitslager Treblinka
- Location: near the village of Treblinka
- Built by: Nazi Germany
- Operated by: a dozen or so Germans; 100 Trawniki men
- Commandant: Theodor van Eupen
- Operational: late summer of 1941–July 23, 1944
- Inmates: Poles, Jews, Romani people, Sinti
- Number of inmates: about 20 thousand
- Killed: about 10 thousand

The Treblinka labor camp (officially Der SS- und Polizeiführer im Distrikt Warschau Arbeitslager Treblinka, commonly known as Treblinka I) was a German Nazi labor camp operating from September 1941 to 23 July 1944. It was located in Gmina Kosów Lacki in the Sokołów County, along the Siedlce–Sokołów Podlaski–Małkinia railway line, near the village and railway station of Treblinka, from which it derived its name.

The camp primarily detained men and women accused of economic and criminal offenses, as well as victims of łapankas and raids. Initially, Polish inmates from the Warsaw District predominated, but over time, the number of Jewish prisoners increased. Inmates mainly worked in a gravel pit adjacent to the camp. Overall, approximately 20,000 people passed through the camp, of whom about 10,000 died or were murdered.

== Origins ==
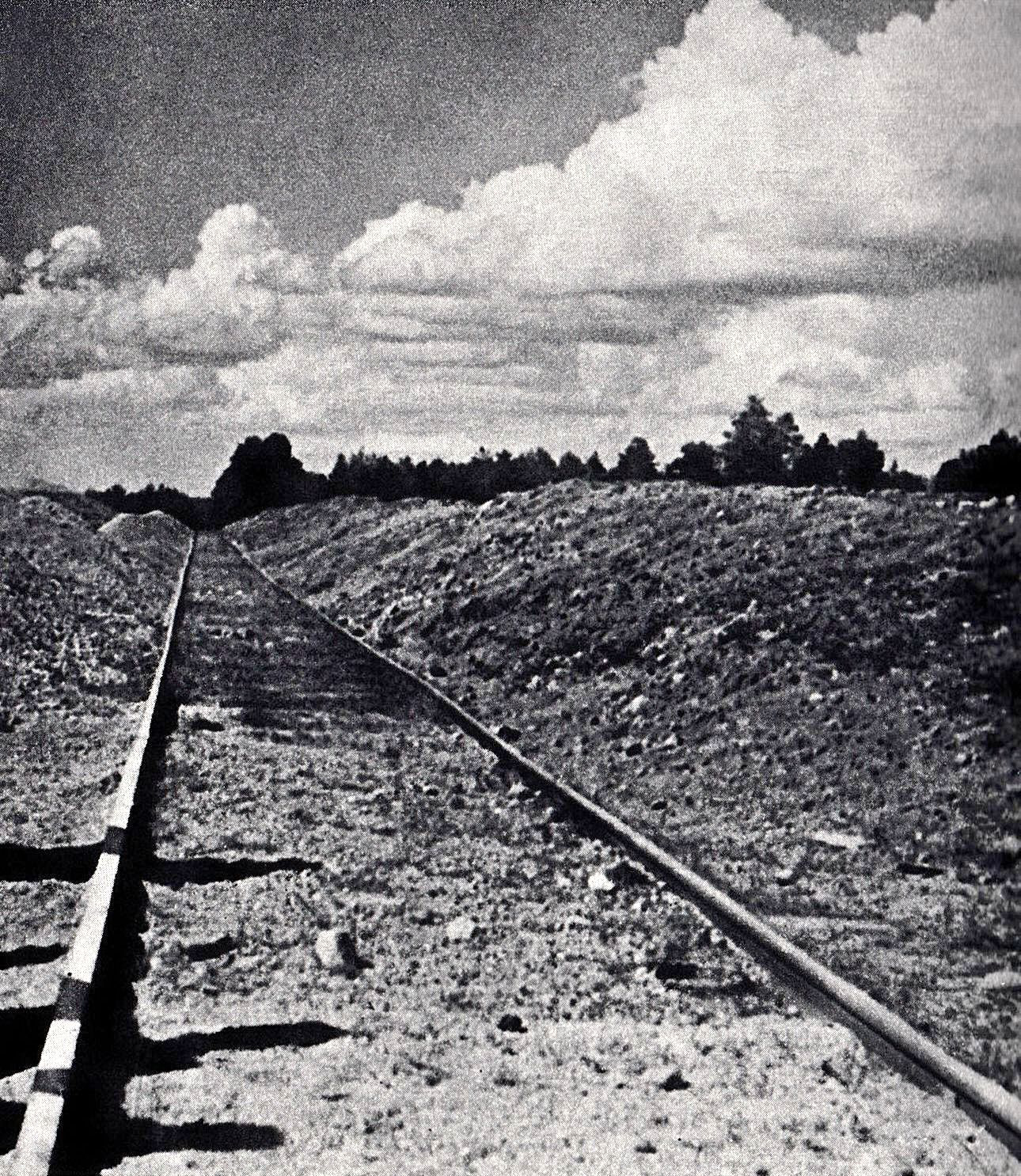
Industrial spur connecting the gravel pit to the Treblinka railway station

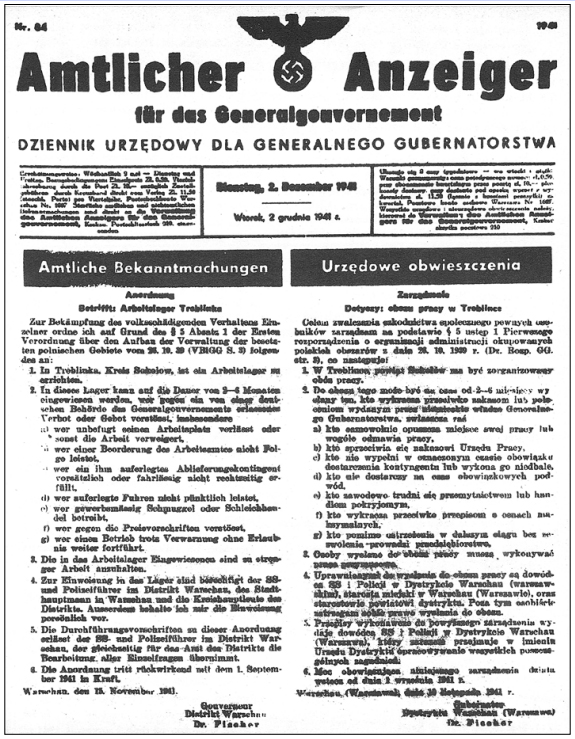
Notice in the Official Journal for the General Government about the establishment of a labor camp in Treblinka (2 December 1941)

In the interwar period, a gravel pit was established within the triangle marked by the villages of Maliszewa, Poniatowo, and Wólka Okrąglik in Gmina Kosów Lacki in the Sokołów County. The gravel pit was owned by the company Lubelskie Kopalnie Granitu i Żwiru and was connected by a specially built industrial spur to the Treblinka railway station, six kilometers away, on the Siedlce–Sokołów Podlaski–Małkinia railway line.

After the beginning of the German occupation, Sokołów County and Węgrów County were merged into one Sokołów-Węgrów County, with its seat in Sokołów Podlaski. This county became part of the Warsaw District of the General Government. In late 1940/early 1941, due to the infrastructure expansion planned for the invasion of the Soviet Union, the occupying authorities took an interest in the gravel pit. At the initiative of County Chief Ernst Gramss, a concrete company was established to produce materials from the excavated gravel. However, the enterprise suffered from a lack of adequate labor; after the outbreak of the German-Soviet war, gravel extraction had to be temporarily halted. To secure a sufficient supply of free labor, Gramss proposed establishing a forced labor camp nearby.

The camp was established in late summer 1941; Franciszek Ząbecki states that this occurred in September. Initially, it was under the local administrative authorities and occupied the gravel pit's farm buildings. During this period, the number of inmates did not exceed a few dozen. Under German supervision, the prisoners expanded the camp using materials (Note: First and foremost, elements of the storage barracks (Kopówka (2013, p. 46)).) left behind by Wehrmacht units that had been stationed in the county before the invasion of the Soviet Union. The establishment of the camp was officially sanctioned by an order from Ludwig Fischer, the governor of the Warsaw District, on 15 November 1941 (retroactively effective from 1 September 1941). Uniquely, the Polish public was informed about its establishment through posters and the Nazi-controlled Warsaw press shortly after Fischer's order was issued.

=== Name ===
The camp took its name from the nearby village and the Treblinka railway station. Initially, its official name was Arbeitserziehungslager (English: Reformatory Labor Camp), later appearing in official German documents as Der SS- und Polizeiführer im Distrikt Warschau Arbeitslager Treblinka. In Polish historiography, it is usually referred to as the forced labor camp in Treblinka. To distinguish it from the nearby extermination camp, which operated from July 1942 to November 1943, the labor camp is also sometimes called Treblinka I. (Note: In the first post-war studies, the terms Treblinka A and Treblinka B were applied to the forced labor camp and the extermination camp, respectively (Witt (1970, p. 226)).)

== Topography of the camp ==
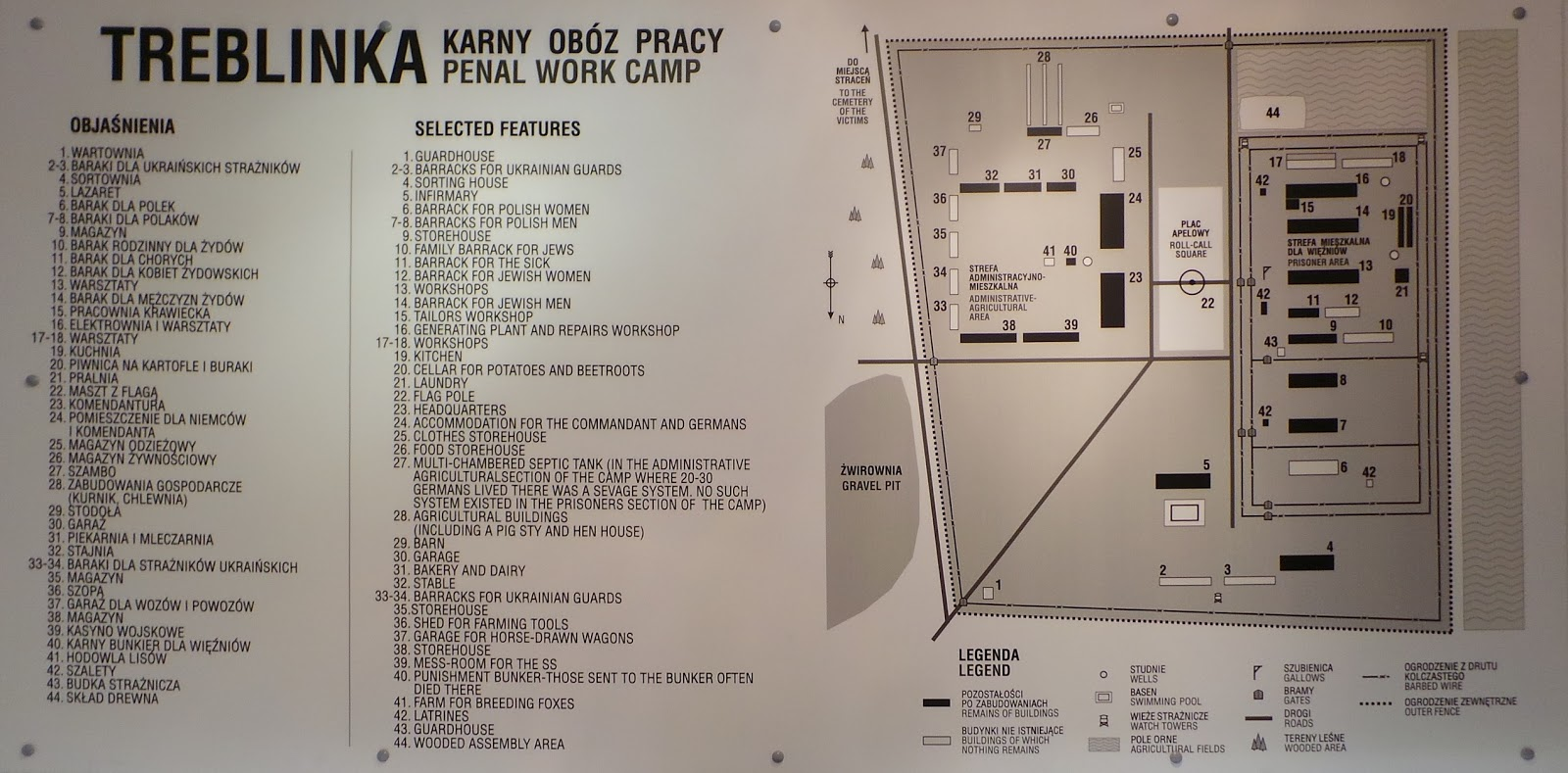
Plan of the camp. Museum of Struggle and Martyrdom in Treblinka

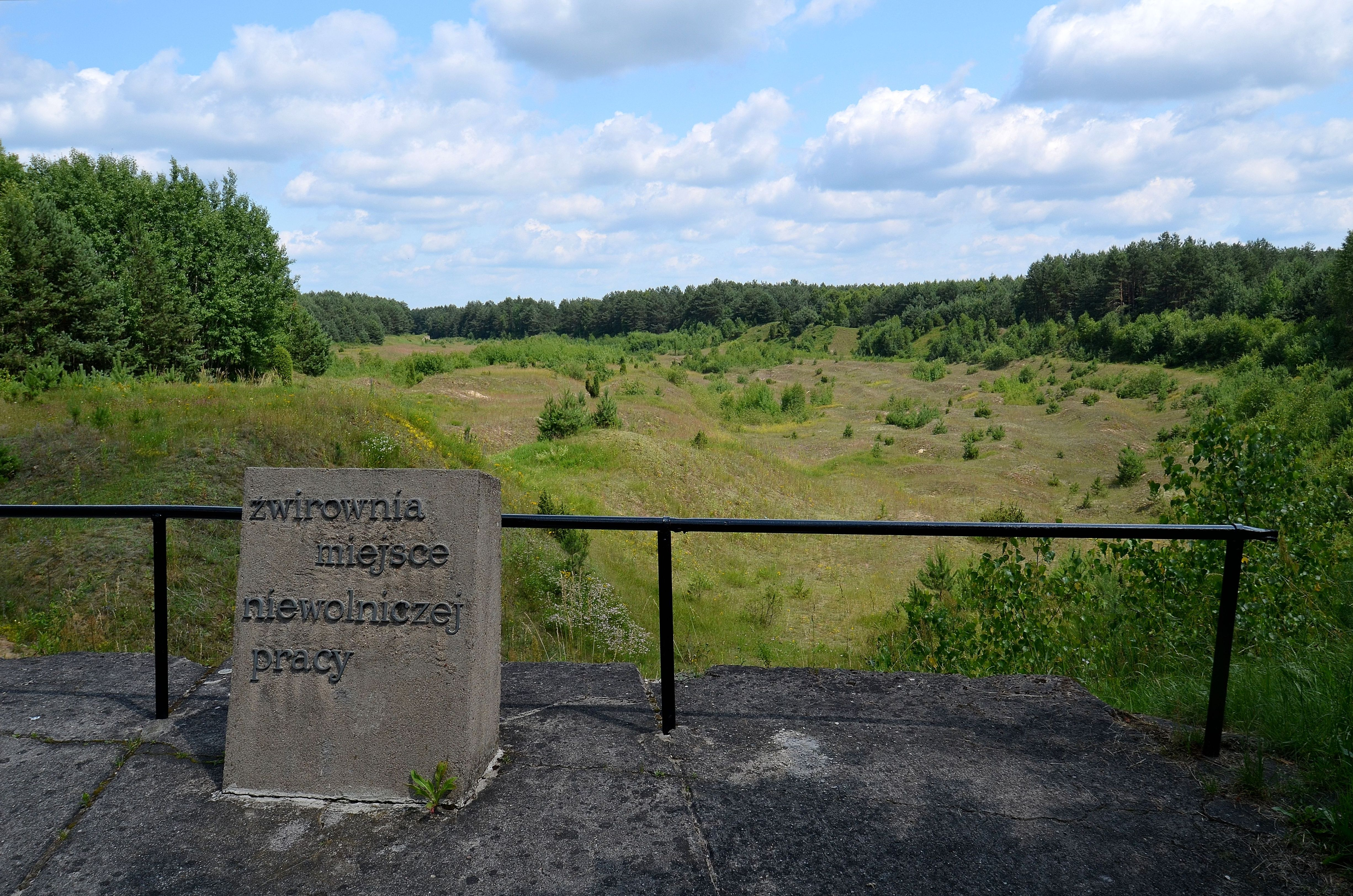
Gravel pit where prisoners worked

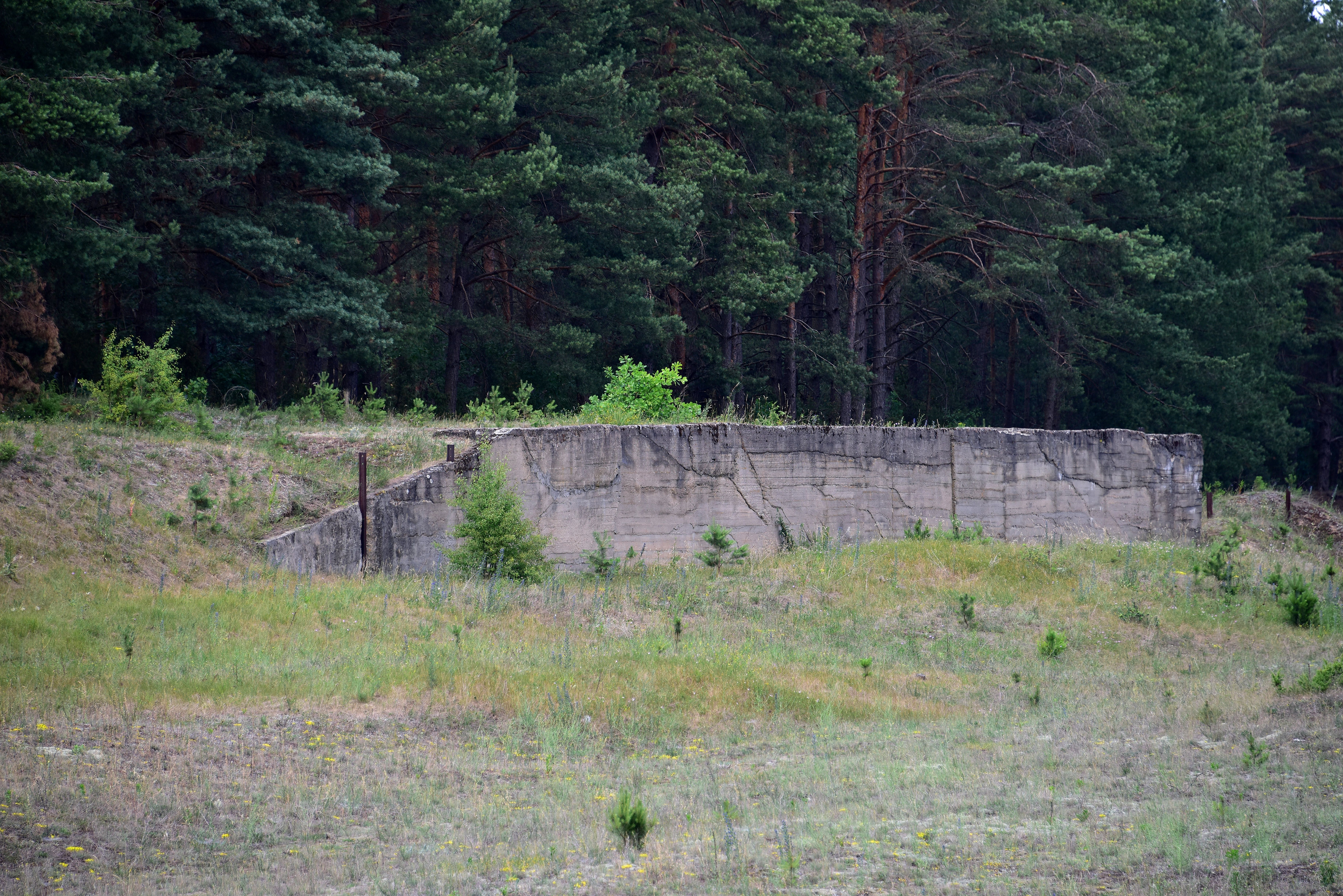
Remnants of the railway ramp in the former gravel pit

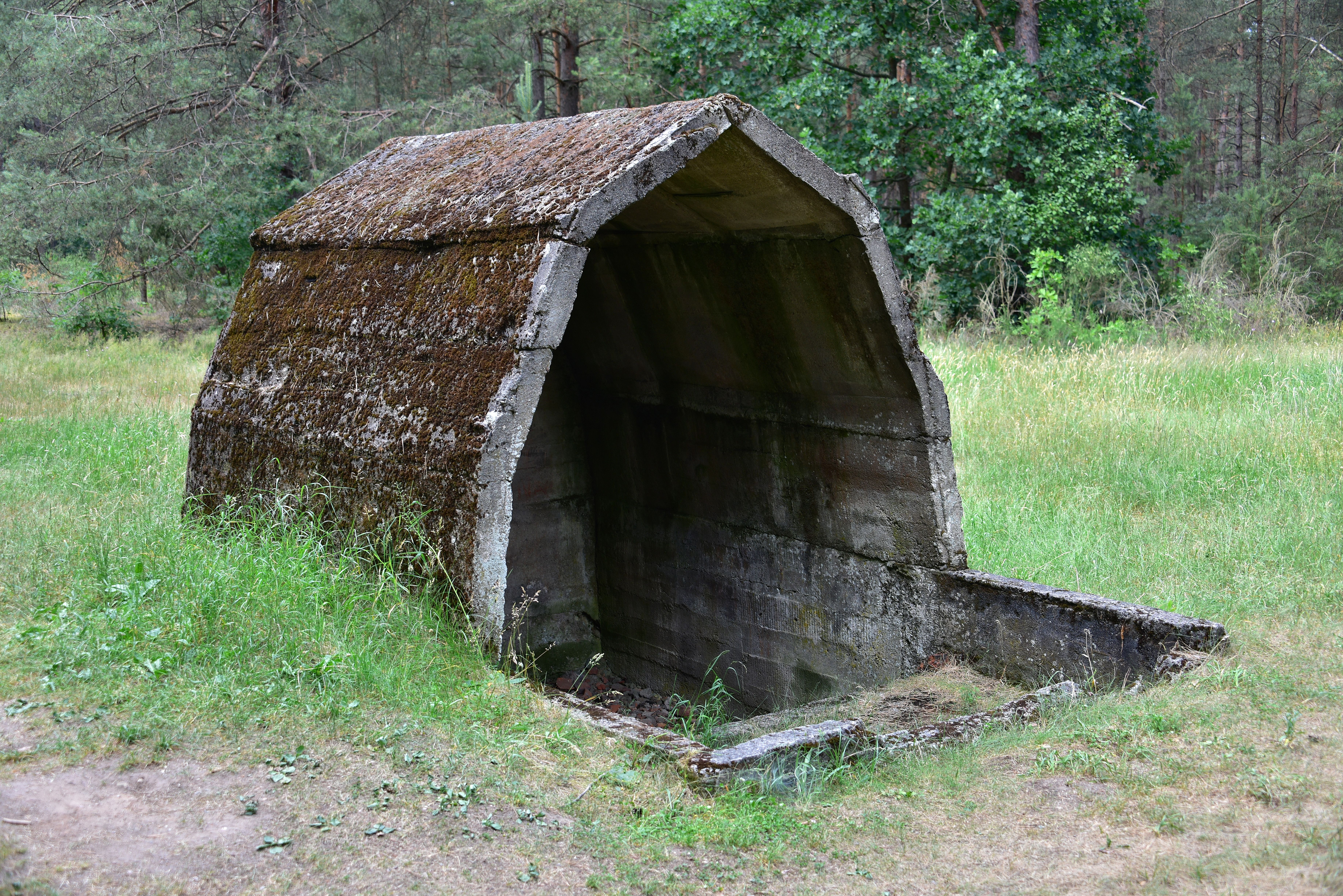
"Bunker" in the gravel pit, likely used for storage purposes

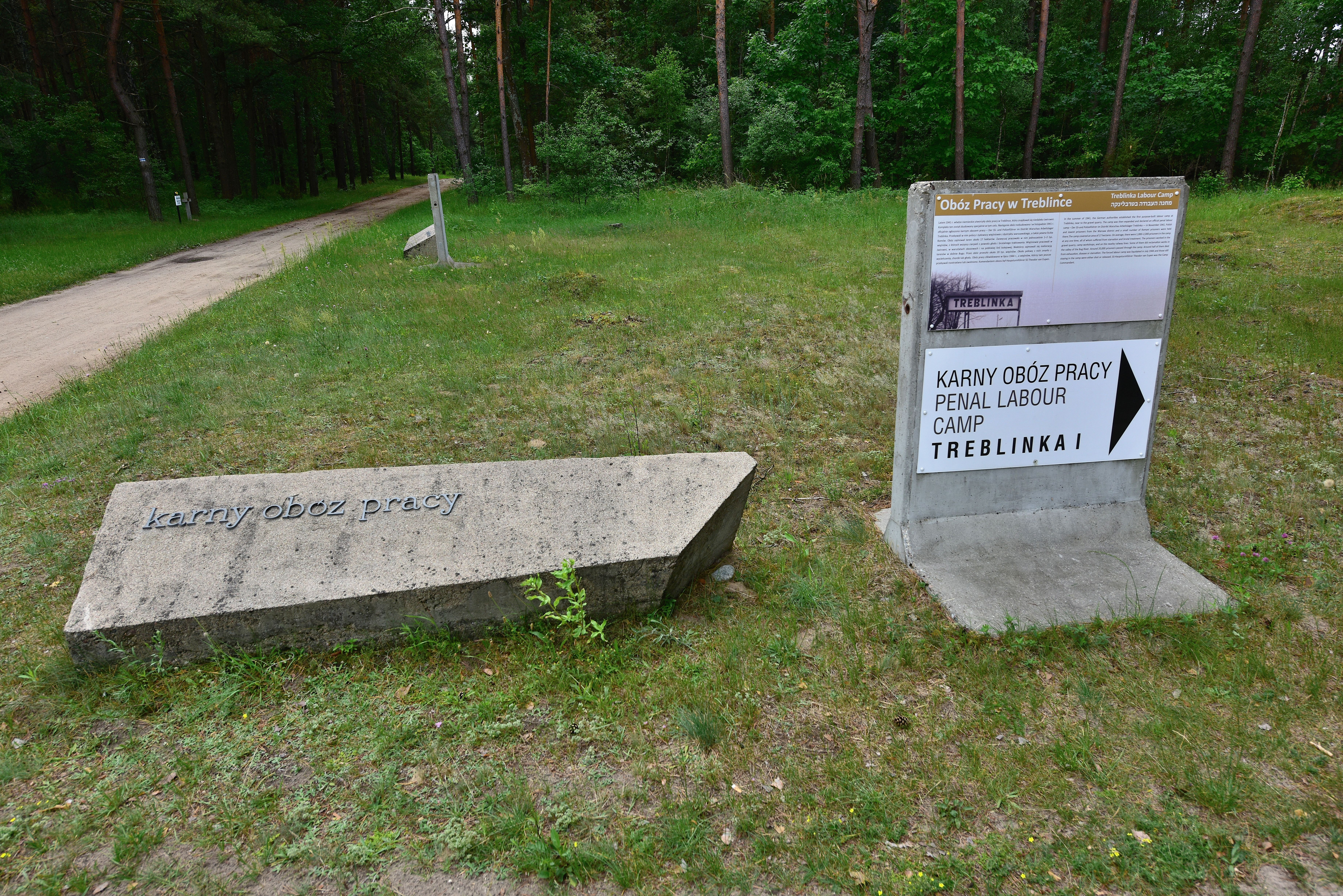
Signs along the road leading to the former camp site

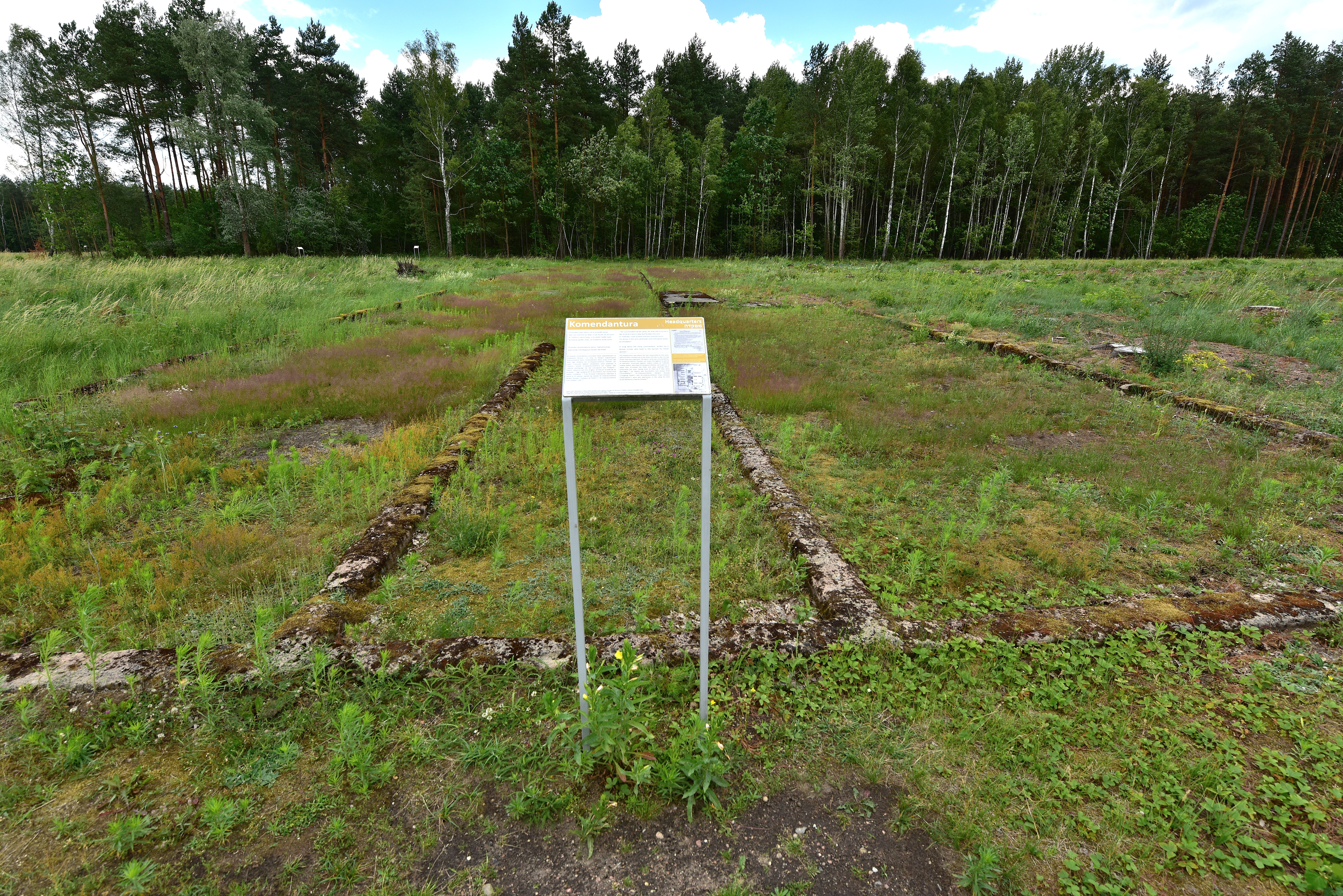
Site of the former commandant's office

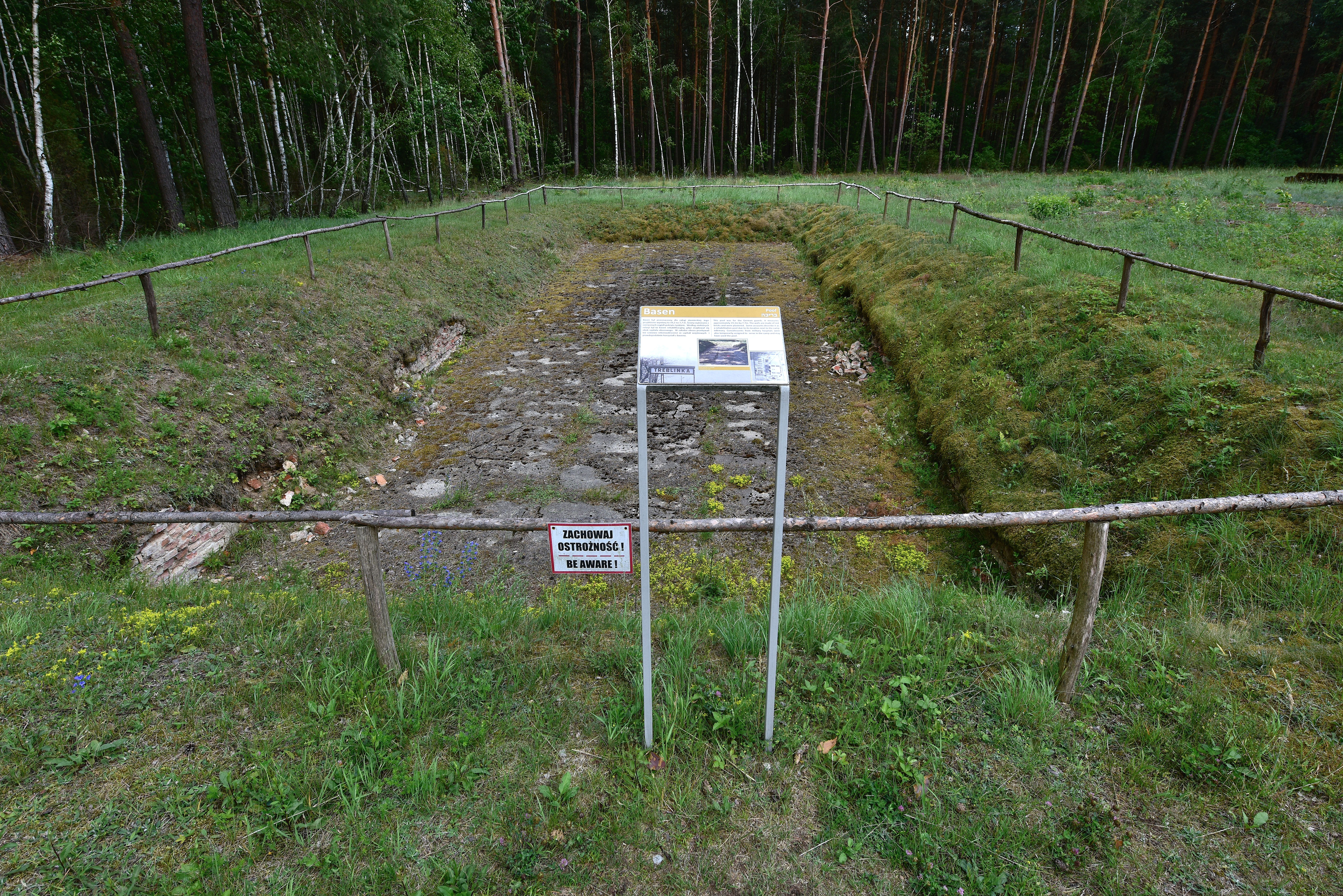
Swimming pool for the German staff

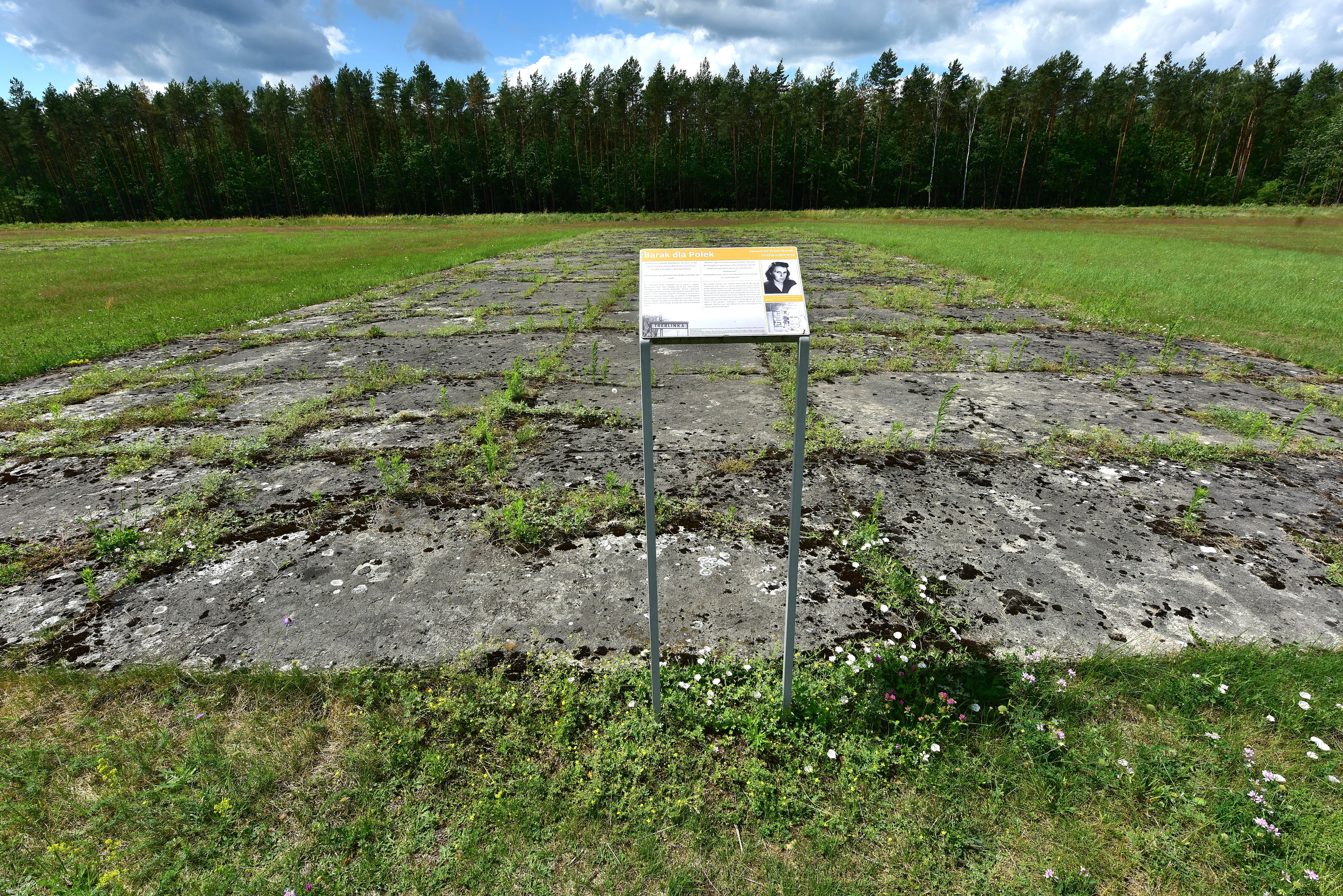
Remnants of the barrack for female prisoners

The camp had an irregular quadrilateral shape, covering an area of 17 ha. It was divided into two zones: the prisoner zone and the administrative-economic zone. It was surrounded by a barbed wire fence over 2 m high. In the fall of 1943, additional coils of barbed wire and anti-tank barriers were installed outside the fence, transferred from the liquidated extermination camp Treblinka II. The main gate was located in the northeastern corner of the fence, with the inscription Arbeit macht frei above it. Guard towers were erected at key points of the camp. The road leading from the main gate to the commandant's office and the German staff building was paved, while the other internal roads were gravel.

The prisoner zone was located in the western part of the camp, occupying about 25% of its area. It was enclosed by a double barbed wire fence. Additional fences were also erected inside the zone, separating men from women and Polish prisoners from Jewish prisoners. The prisoners were housed in wooden barracks measuring 12.5 m by 40 m. Additionally, in the prisoner zone there were: a carpentry shop, a locksmith's workshop, a tailor's workshop, a laundry, a kitchen, a small power plant with a generator, and a vegetable garden whose produce was intended for the camp staff. To the south of the zone was the so-called Holzplatz, a yard where construction wood was initially processed and firewood was chopped. To the north of the zone was a sorting building. (Note: About 100 Polish female prisoners worked there sorting, disinfecting and repairing uniforms and soldier's equipment that the Germans had captured on the Eastern Front (Kopówka (2013, p. 48)).)

The administrative-economic zone encompassed the eastern and northern parts of the camp. This area contained the commandant's office and the German staff building, which housed the commandant's quarters. Nearby was an underground bunker where prisoners were tortured and held shortly before execution. This part of the camp also had barracks for guards, garages, warehouses, a stable, a pigsty, a henhouse, a bakery, a dairy, a butcher's shop, and a fox farm. Just inside the main gate was a guardhouse. Unlike the prisoner zone, the administrative-economic zone was fully sewered and electrified. Two swimming pools were built here – a large one for the German staff and a smaller one for the commandant.

== Personnel ==
The camp's staff consisted of several dozen German Schutzstaffel men and about 100 guards (Trawniki men).

The camp commandant for the entire period of its existence was SS-Hauptsturmführer Theodor van Eupen. In civilian life, he was a lawyer practicing in Berlin. Witnesses recalled that van Eupen never personally beat prisoners and even addressed them in a very polite manner. Nonetheless, due to his ruthlessness, he instilled fear both among the inmates and the camp staff, whom he would send to the Eastern Front for various infractions. Karl Prefi served as the deputy commandant (Note: Kopówka (2013, p. 49) states that his name was Karol Gustav Preif (Fritz Pröfi) while adding that he had the rank of Sturmführer.) and was also responsible for the economic part of the camp.

Other key positions in the camp were held by:

- SS-Untersturmführer Lundecke – the commandant's adjutant, head of the camp office;
- SS-Untersturmführer Herbert Stumpe – head of the guard unit, nicknamed "Laughing Death" by prisoners;
- SS-Untersturmführer Franz Schwarz – supervised the labor Kommando working at the Małkinia railway station, on drainage works along the Bug river, and in peat digging. He conducted "selections" and often personally carried out death sentences. Known as "The Executioner" to prisoners;
- SS-Unterscharführer Hagen – responsible for the camp's economic affairs;
- SS-Untersturmführer Franz Leopold Lanz – head of the workshops, also responsible for training guards;
- SS-Rottenführer Wilhelm Weishar – head of the agricultural farm about 0.5 km from the camp (Socha and Milewek estates). He also oversaw the camp stable and animal pens;
- Dingelmann – the SS man in charge of the prisoners' condition, conducting daily roll calls;
- Hans Heinbuch – the SS man responsible for the Jewish section of the camp.

The guards were recruited from the so-called Trawniki men, Eastern European collaborators trained at the SS camp in Trawniki. Most were Soviet prisoners of war who had agreed to serve the Germans for various reasons. Their unit was transferred from Trawniki to Treblinka I in November 1941.

It is assumed that most of the guards were Ukrainian. However, the term "Ukrainians" is not entirely accurate, as the Germans sought to recruit primarily Soviet Volksdeutsche (ethnic Germans) and representatives of other non-Russian nations of the Soviet Union. Due to a lack of recruits, native Russians were often also conscripted. It is known that among the Treblinka I camp guards, there were Latvians and Lithuanians. The guard who served as the commandant's orderly was even found to be half-Jewish.

== Prisoners ==
=== Categories and nationality division ===
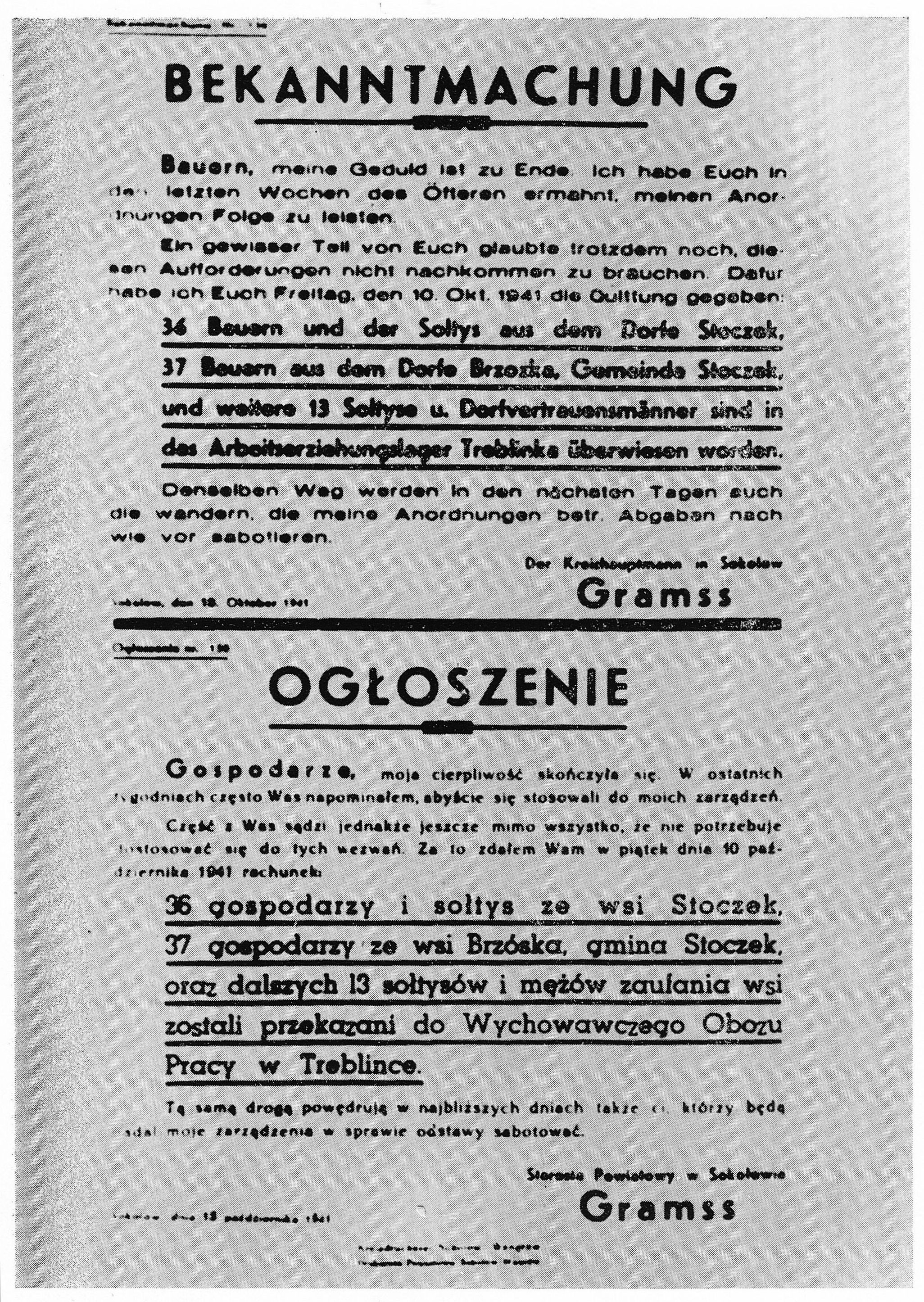
Announcement by district chief Ernst Gramss on the detention of Polish farmers from Gmina Stoczek in the Treblinka labor camp

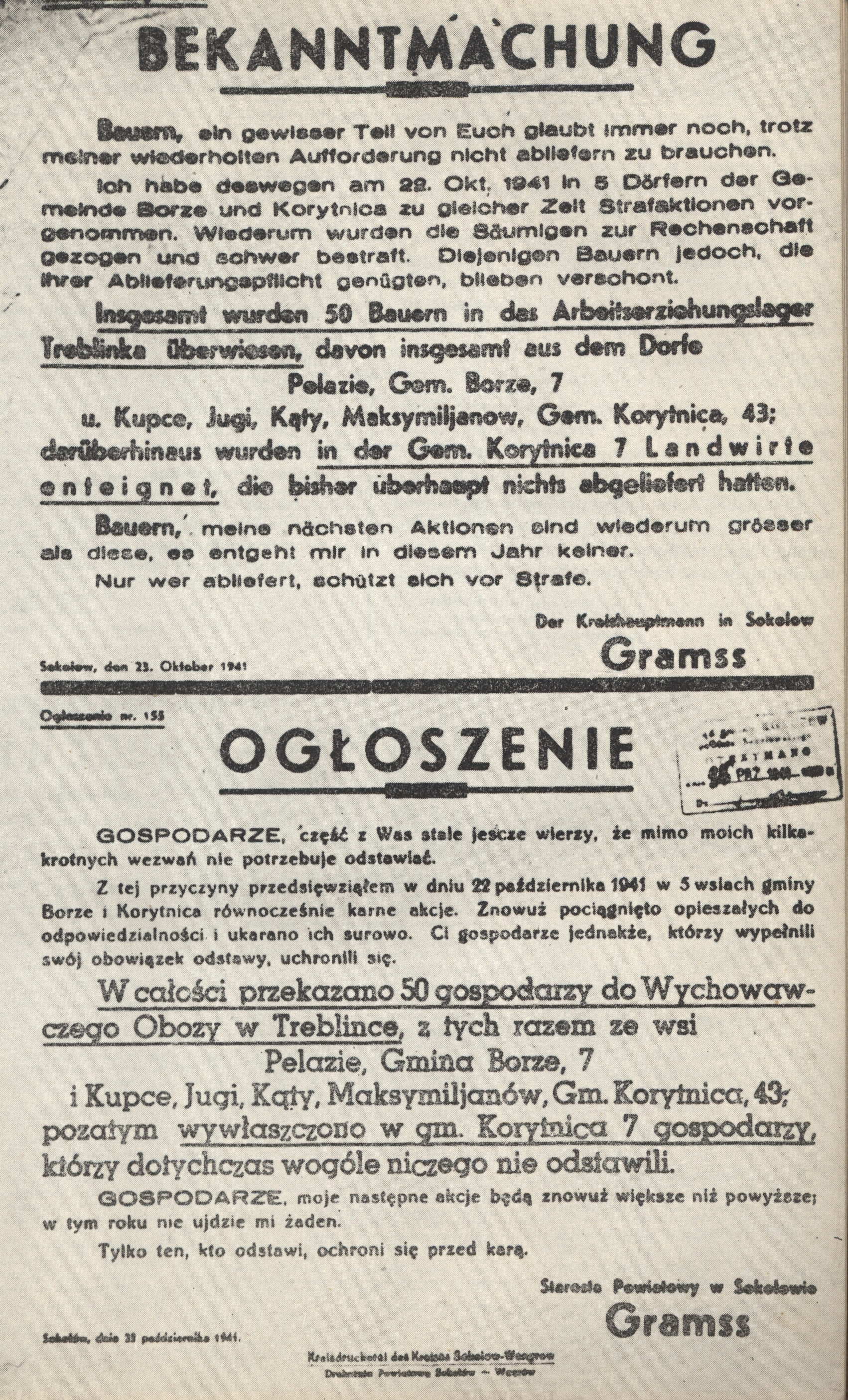
Announcement by district chief Gramss on the detention of 50 farmers from Gmina Borze and Gmina Korytnica in the Treblinka labor camp

The Treblinka labor camp formally fell under the jurisdiction of the SS and police leader for the Warsaw District. Besides him, decisions to send individuals to the camp could be made by the Governor of the Warsaw District, the City Governor of Warsaw, and the district chiefs of other counties in the district.

Primarily, the camp detained men and women accused of economic and criminal offenses, such as smuggling, black market trading, speculation, failing to meet compulsory agricultural quotas or providing labor, running a business without proper authorization, ignoring a work order, or leaving the workplace without permission. Offenses like tardiness or riding a train without a ticket could also result in detention. Polish administrative employees accused of negligence, abuse, or minor economic sabotage were also interned. As Władysław Bartoszewski notes, at times, nearly 20% of the inmates were employees of the Warsaw Municipal Administration (e.g., tram operators who didn’t issue tickets to passengers). For instance, three residents of Korczew were interned for organizing a dance without German permission.

The camp also held victims of łapankas, often in retaliation for resistance activities. Family members of those caught hiding Jews or escaped Soviet prisoners, those arrested for curfew violations, or minor acts of defiance against German authority, and individuals whose judicial proceedings were incomplete or juvenile offenders were also sent there. From December 1943, Poles without any offenses or charges were sent to Treblinka I simply to meet the demand for forced labor.

Initially, the camp mainly held Poles – first from the Sokołów-Węgrów County, then from other counties in the Warsaw District. There was no initial segregation by nationality. This changed in 1942. In February, a meeting including judicial representatives and the Warsaw Ghetto commissioner Heinz Auerswald decided that juvenile Jews accused of criminal offenses would be sent to Treblinka. From July, with the Holocaust in full swing, Jewish craftsmen and artisans were also sent there. Small groups of young Jewish men were taken from transports to the nearby extermination camp and subjected to "extermination through labor" at Treblinka I. Some Jewish artisans, typically from nearby towns, were interned with their families, who served as hostages. The camp held Polish Jews, as well as Jews from Germany, Czechoslovakia, and France. French Jews worked in the gravel pit and within the camp, while German and Czech Jews included specialists and functionary prisoners.

Governor Fischer’s directive indicated that prisoner terms would range from two to six months. However, the commandant could extend terms indefinitely under various pretexts. Some prisoners, such as escaped forced laborers or family members of those hiding Jews, were held indefinitely. After serving their terms, some were sent to forced labor in Germany.

Each group of ten prisoners was led by a kapo. The highest-ranking prisoner (lager-kapo) was a 45-year-old Jewish pharmacist from Warsaw named Ignac, who attended roll calls with the Germans in both the Polish and Jewish sections of the camp. Among Polish prisoners, the highest-ranking was kapo Czesław Zeifert, with Witold Jóźwiak as his deputy. Zeifert was executed in September 1943 for misappropriating Jewish gold and dollars.

=== Living conditions and treatment ===
A typical day for a prisoner in the Treblinka labor camp was as follows:

- 5:00 AM – wake-up call
- 6:00 AM – roll call, followed by breakfast
- from 7:00 AM to 12:00 PM – work
- from 12:00 PM to 1:00 PM – lunch break
- from 1:00 PM to 4:00 PM or 6:00 PM – work
- 7:00 PM – dinner, followed by roll call, then confinement in barracks
- 10:00 PM – lights out

Prisoners received official rations: half a liter of watery soup or porridge for breakfast, a liter of soup for lunch, and a cup of unsweetened coffee with between 10 and 20 decagrams of rye bread for dinner, sometimes with a small piece of margarine or marmalade. Occasionally, they received horse meat. Some managed to get additional food secretly from workers, railwaymen, or peasants delivering carts, sometimes through bribed guards. (Note: This was a risky method; there were cases of women being raped if they got too close to the camp fence (Kopówka (2002, p. 104)).) In 1944, Polish prisoners received food packages from the Polish Red Cross twice.

New arrivals did not receive special camp uniforms but stayed in their own clothes and shoes. They lived in dark, overcrowded barracks they couldn’t leave at night. They slept on wooden bunks and had to remove their shoes after lights out, as keeping them on was seen as an escape attempt. Latrines were outside, accessible only during the day. At night, prisoners used buckets or bathtubs for their needs. They were not allowed to draw water from the wells, leading to thirst and poor hygiene.

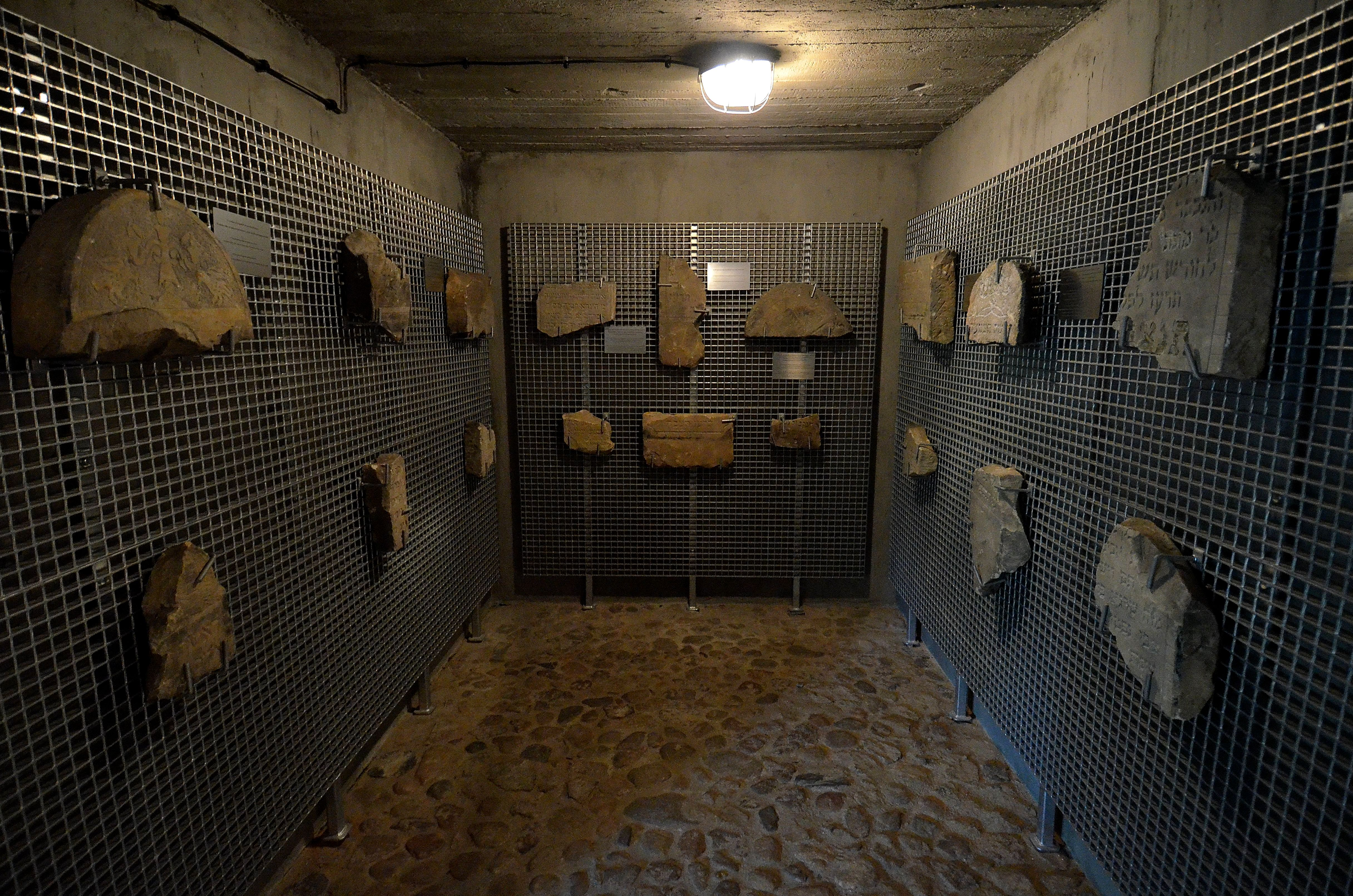
Fragments of massebot used for the construction of the “Black Road” connecting the labor camp with the Treblinka II extermination camp

Governor Fischer's directive on 15 November 1941 mandated that prisoners be engaged in severe labor. An accompanying circular on 1 December 1941 allowed the commandant to make agreements for prisoners to work for German enterprises. Prisoners without useful skills were usually assigned heavy physical labor. About 400 worked in the gravel pit, extracting and loading gravel into train cars. (Note: Each newly arrived prisoner had to work in the gravel pit for a period of time (Kopówka (2013, p. 55)).) Others worked at railway stations in Małkinia and Komorowo, building flood embankments and draining swamps in the Małkinia area, constructing the "Black Road" to the extermination camp, and obtaining or processing firewood. Many worked within the camp in sorting facilities, workshops, maintenance, or assisting the staff. Polish prisoners with short sentences worked on a farm half a kilometer away, and Jewish artisans' families were held as hostages. Older Poles and Jews worked near Majdan Kupientyński extracting and drying peat. In spring of 1942, a group of prisoners helped build the Treblinka extermination camp.

Poor food, terrible hygiene, and exhausting work quickly debilitated the prisoners. Lice and scabies were common. An epidemic of typhus in autumn 1942 caused many deaths, with further outbreaks in subsequent months.

The camp regime resembled that of a regular concentration camp, with extreme brutality. Whippings were common for rule violations, typically 25 to 50 lashes, but if the count was lost, the punishment restarted. Guards beat and killed prisoners during work, particularly in the gravel pit. Women were taken from barracks at night, often found dead the next day, likely a result of SS-Unterscharführer Hagen's actions. Hagen also tormented and killed Jews, especially when drunk. The most feared member was SS-Untersturmführer Franz Schwarz, called "The Executioner" by prisoners, who killed numerous prisoners daily, usually with blunt instruments.

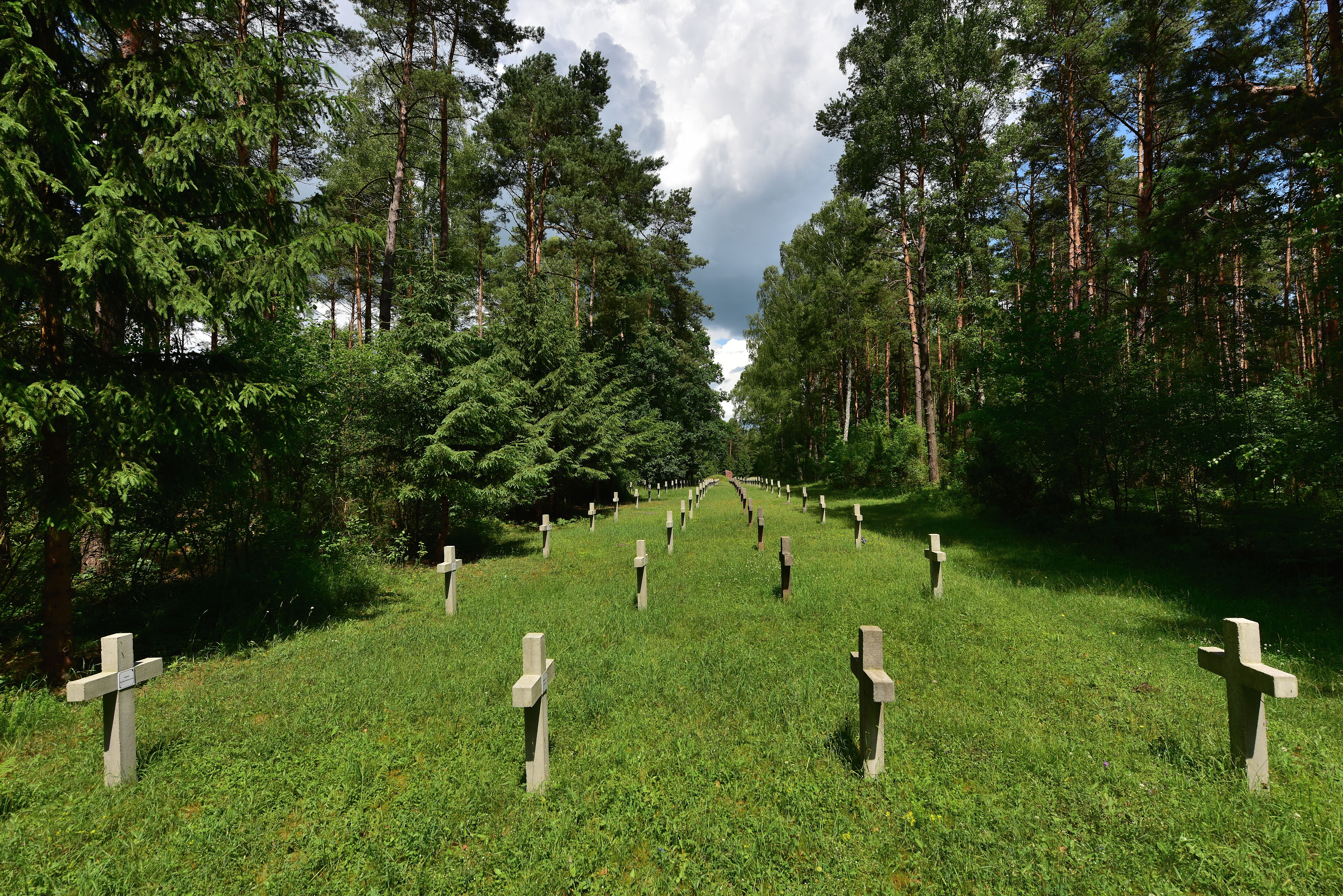
Graves in the Maliszewski Forest

The unfit or severely punished were shot in the Maliszewski Forest, about half a kilometer south of the camp. (Note: Prisoners who died of starvation, disease and exhaustion were also buried in the same place. In addition, in the Maliszewski Forest, in separate graves, were buried Ukrainian Trawniki men who died of typhus (Kopówka (2002, pp. 107–108)).) In autumn 1942, most typhus-infected prisoners were executed there. Other cruel executions occurred at the camp's Holzplatz, where Schwarz and Gruppenwachman Franz Swidersky killed prisoners with hammers or pickaxes. Unfit Jewish prisoners were sometimes gassed in Treblinka II.

The Maliszewski Forest was also the execution site for prisoners from Warsaw and Sokołów Podlaski. In early March 1942, 100 political prisoners from Warsaw's Pawiak prison and Gestapo detention were executed, including members of the Polish elite. In late May 1942, German authorities decided to execute Warsaw Ghetto residents sentenced to death by the special court at Treblinka. (Note: This was due to the fact that the number of Jews condemned to death was very large at the time, hence the execution of sentences on the territory of Warsaw would have posed difficulties for the Germans (Bartoszewski (1970, p. 183)).) The first of these executions likely occurred in June 1942. (Note: Kopówka (2002, pp. 107–108) reports that the first executions of Jews brought to Treblinka from the Warsaw Ghetto took place in April 1942.) The number of Jews who had been executed at Treblinka by sentence of the Warsaw Sondergericht by the time the “Grossaktion Warsaw” began remains difficult to determine. Jan Grabowski speculates that between April and August 1942 the special court issued between 500 and 700 death sentences.

Between 1942 and 1943, Romani people and Sinti were also mass-murdered in the forest. Reports from the Government Delegation for Poland suggest that in 1943, Italian prisoners of war may have been executed there as well.

=== Attempts to escape and resist ===
The Germans took numerous measures to prevent prisoner escapes. Those caught attempting to escape were punished with death. A principle of collective responsibility was introduced, meaning that a successful escape would result in the execution of ten or more prisoners employed in the same work detail as the escapee. The escapee's family was also punished if they were in the camp or if their whereabouts were known to the German authorities. Despite this, prisoners attempted escapes; for instance, on 2 September 1943, thirteen prisoners gathering stones in a field managed to escape. Escape attempts increased in the summer of 1944 as the Eastern Front approached Treblinka.

A resistance movement also formed within the camp, with members (Note: They were mainly farm workers and cooks (Kopówka (2013, p. 58)).) possibly collaborating with conspirators from the adjacent extermination camp to plan an uprising and mass escape. They even managed to acquire two grenades and a pistol. However, shortly before the rebellion was to start, the plot was discovered, leading to the arrest and execution of thirteen would-be insurgents, including the alleged leader of the conspiracy, lager-kapo Ignac. Nevertheless, a group of Jewish cooks involved in the plot, along with a Polish prisoner, managed to escape. After these events, the prisoners at Treblinka I did not attempt to organize another resistance movement.

=== Number of prisoners and victims ===
Determining the exact number of prisoners and the number of those who died or were murdered is challenging, as camp records have not survived. It is estimated that at any given time, the camp held between 1,000 and 2,000 prisoners. The total number of prisoners who passed through Treblinka I is estimated to be around 20,000.

Hunger, disease, exhausting labor, and the cruelty of the guards led to high mortality rates. According to a survivor's account, between November 12 and December 20, 1943, 148 prisoners died. Based on the examination of mass graves and witness testimonies, Edward Kopówka estimated that the number of victims in Treblinka I was around 10,000. This figure does not include prisoners who were buried elsewhere or those sent to the gas chambers in the nearby extermination camp due to being unfit for work.

Other authors estimate the number of victims to be at least 7,000 or between 10,000 and 12,000.

== Liquidation of the camp ==
On 23 July 1944, as the Red Army approached, the Germans began to liquidate the camp. Around 6:00 PM, Polish prisoners were locked in one of the barracks, while approximately 550 Jewish prisoners were gathered in a square and ordered to lie face down on the ground. The Germans then separated about 17 skilled workers and began leading the remaining Jews, including women and children, in groups to the Maliszewski Forest, where they were executed beside three previously dug graves. A few individuals survived the massacre.

That evening, the Germans also executed about 20 Polish prisoners, including women and children. The remaining Poles were released.

After the executions, the camp's documentation was destroyed, and the guards left Treblinka, taking with them the accumulated wealth and a few skilled prisoners. Once the evacuation was complete, several Germans arrived at Treblinka to burn down the camp's buildings. The next day, around 30 prisoners were brought from Sokołów Podlaski and executed in a forest near the camp.

== Post-war history ==
=== Period of desecration ===
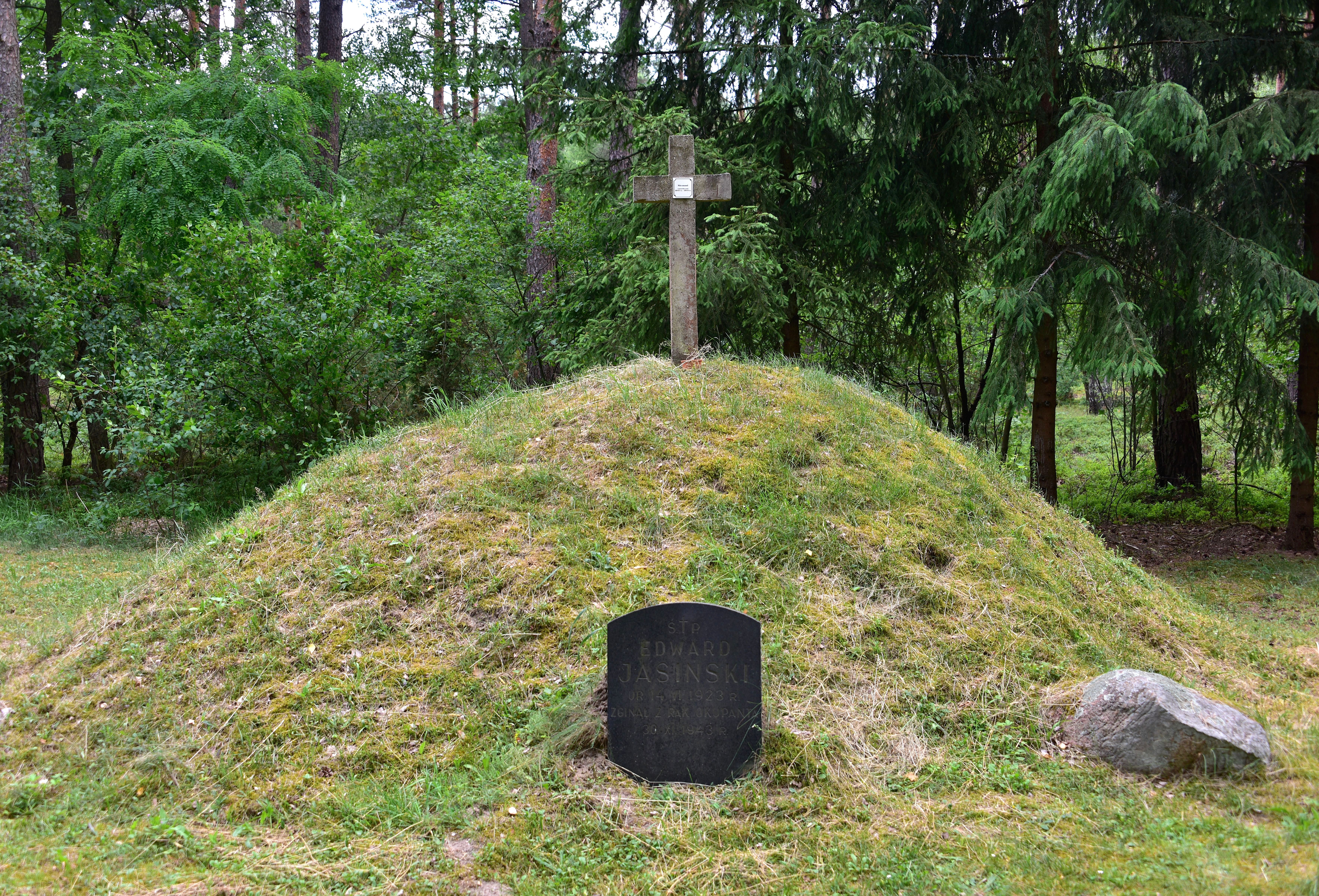
Mound in Maliszewski Forest erected in 1947

From 22 to 23 August 1944, shortly after the Germans were driven out of the Treblinka area, a special commission of the Soviet 65th Army examined the site of the labor camp and the nearby execution area. The commission exhumed three mass graves found in Maliszewski Forest. From the first grave, they recovered 105 bodies, likely of people murdered in the winter of 1942/1943. The second grave contained 97 bodies, probably of murdered Romani people. From the third grave, 103 bodies were exhumed, including 25 female bodies, likely victims murdered during the camp's liquidation.

Between 9 and 10 August 1946, representatives of the Chief Commission for the Prosecution of Crimes against the Polish Nation inspected the execution site in Maliszewski Forest. They discovered 41 mass graves and 6 single graves. 40 graves were completely dug up, and one was partially disturbed. The inspection revealed that the graves covered an area of about 1,607 m² with a capacity of 3,214 m³ (assuming an average depth of 2 m). 10 bodies were exhumed, and 112 skulls were examined.

In the early post-war years, the former labor camp site was unsecured and unmarked. Similar to the nearby extermination camp, "grave hyenas" operated there, digging up graves and the camp area in search of gold and valuables. Efforts to protect the remains from desecration initially came from grassroots initiatives. It is known that in September 1947, local children, prompted by their teacher, collected human bones scattered around the camp area and built a mound, which they covered with turf and topped with a cross. (Note: The mound has been preserved to this day. It is located behind the monument in the Maliszewski Forest (Zawadka (2015, p. 35)).)

It wasn't until 1947, partly due to pressure from Jewish organizations, that the communist authorities took steps to secure the Treblinka camp sites and commemorate the victims. On 2 July 1947, the Sejm passed a law to commemorate the Treblinka II extermination center and the Treblinka I labor camp. A Committee for the Commemoration of Treblinka Victims was established, chaired by Warsaw voivode Lucjusz Dura. During the committee's first meeting on 25 July 1947, they decided to hold a closed competition for the design of a mausoleum and organize a fundraising campaign to finance its construction. Interest in commemorating Treblinka soon waned, however. The winning mausoleum design by Alfons Zielonka and Władysław Niemiec was not realized. In 1948, the Committee for the Commemoration of Treblinka Victims ceased its activities. For the next 10 years, both camp sites remained unsecured, and "diggers" continued their activities with little hindrance.

The gravel pit where Treblinka I prisoners worked ended up in private hands after the war, and its deposits continued to be exploited. The gravel extracted from Treblinka was used, among other things, for the reconstruction of Warsaw.

=== Commemoration ===
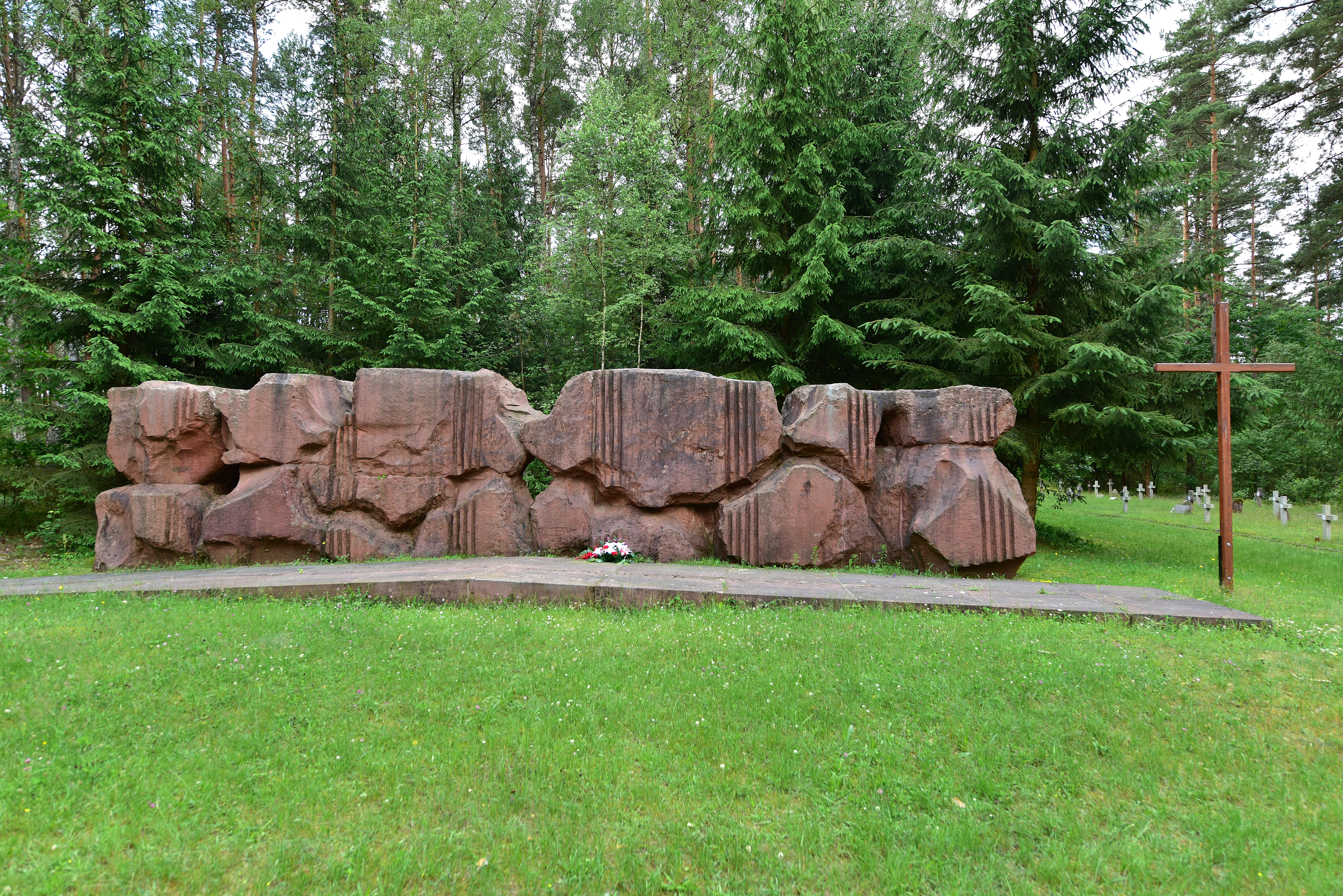
Death Wall by Franciszek Strynkiewicz

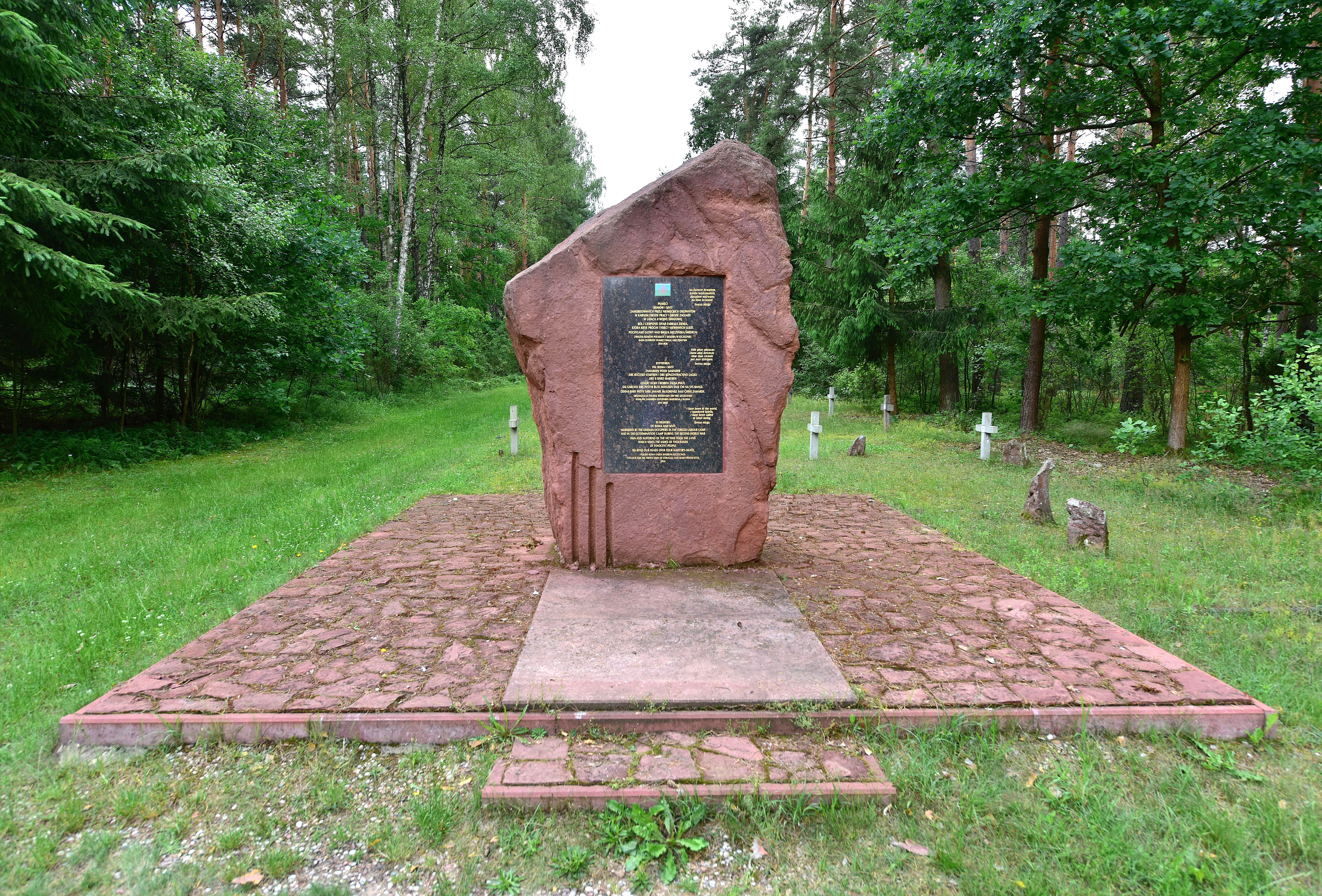
Monument from 2014 commemorating murdered Romani people and Sinti

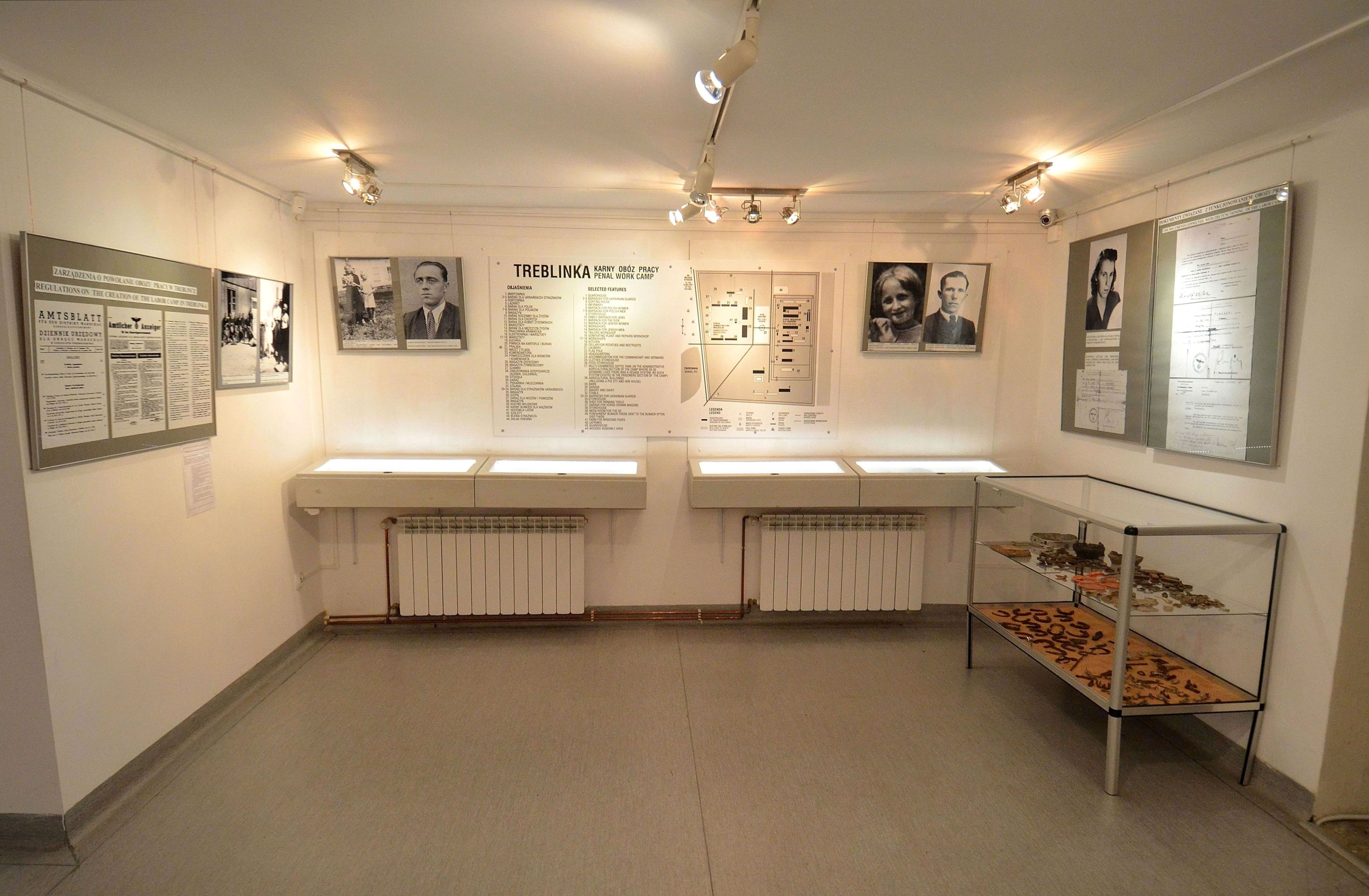
Exhibit on the labor camp at the Museum of Struggle and Martyrdom in Treblinka

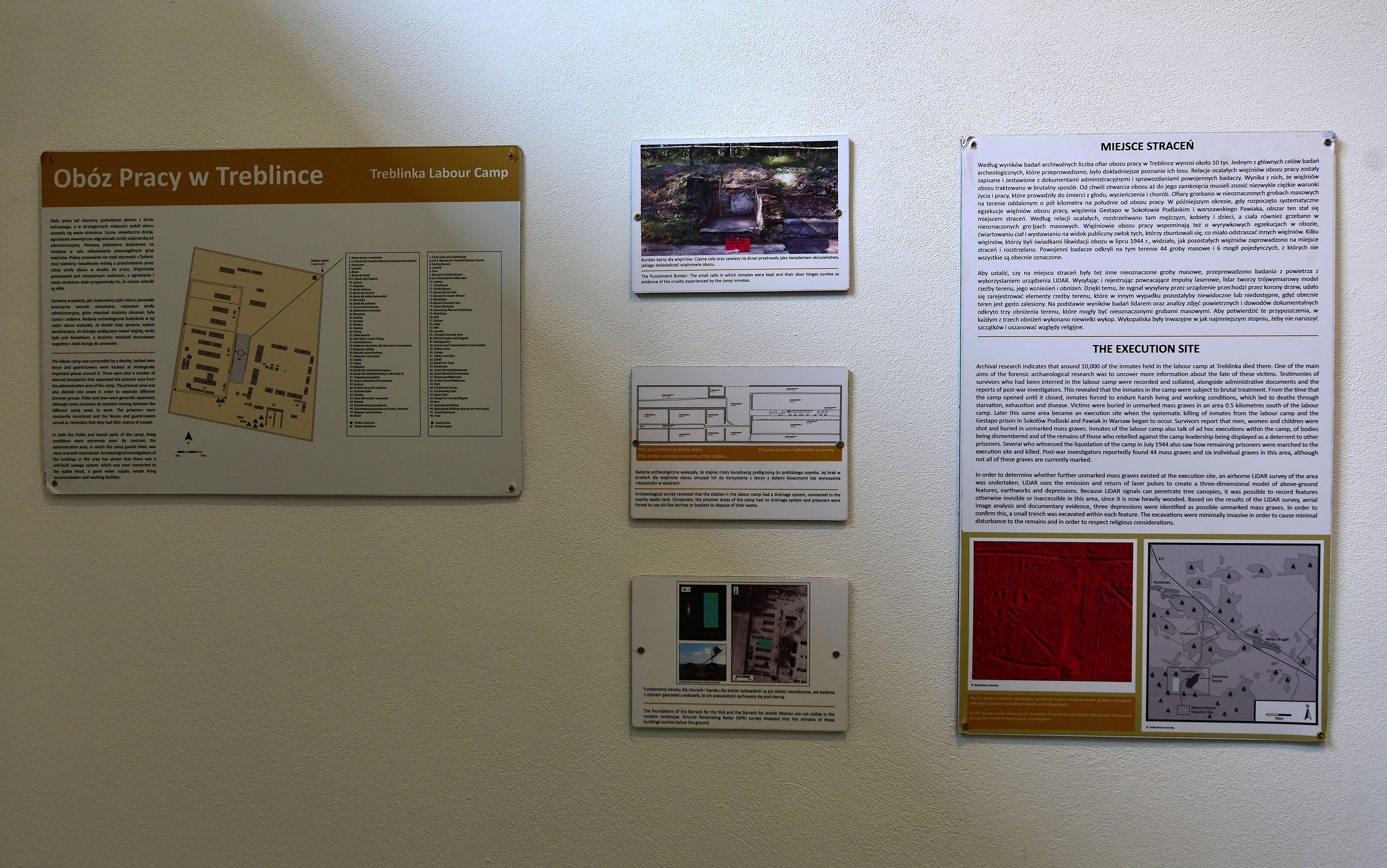
Information boards about the camp in the museum's main hall

In 1955, the Ministry of Culture and National Heritage concluded another competition to develop the Treblinka camp sites. The winning design was a spatial-monumental complex by Franciszek Duszeńko and Adam Haupt. Its implementation was significantly delayed, primarily due to lack of funds, the need to expropriate nearly 127 ha of land, and difficulties finalizing the detailed project plans. It wasn't until 1961 that a final decision was made to build the monument-mausoleum, with the task assigned to the Artistic and Research Workshops at the Warsaw Academy of Fine Arts. Franciszek Strynkiewicz, representing the workshops, joined Haupt and Duszeńko, contributing the artistic element of the labor camp victims' monument.

On 10 May 1964, the spatial-monumental complex commemorating the victims of both camps was officially unveiled. It was named the Mausoleum of Struggle and Martyrdom in Treblinka and encompassed the extermination center, the labor camp site, the nearby gravel pit and execution site, and the "Black Road" connecting the two camps. From 1964 to 1981, the mausoleum was not affiliated with any museum unit. In 1981, it was incorporated into the Armory Museum in Liw, and in 1986, it became a branch of the Regional Museum in Siedlce, renamed the Museum of Struggle and Martyrdom in Treblinka. In 2018, the museum became an independent cultural institution named Treblinka Museum. German Nazi Extermination and Labor Camp (1941–1944).

The main part of the commemoration is the spatial-monumental complex on the former extermination camp site. The labor camp victims' commemoration is more modest. At the Maliszewski Forest execution site, a monument in the form of a red sandstone wall ("death wall", "execution wall") designed by Franciszek Strynkiewicz was erected, with a plaque inscribed In tribute to the murdered placed in front. The mass graves were marked with 112 concrete crosses, and another 12 crosses marked individual graves (by 2015, the number of crosses in the forest had risen to 140). In 2014, a monument dedicated to the murdered Romani people and Sinti was unveiled in the forest.

There was no artistic intervention on the labor camp site itself. It was merely cleared of trees and the remains of camp buildings were secured. Surviving structures include the foundations of the commandant's office, workshops, bunker-cell, German crew pool, and the foundations and floors of prisoner barracks. The latter were secured with concrete overlays. Additionally, a forest was planted along the camp's eastern border, separating it from the nearby gravel pit. The gravel pit was expropriated and included in the commemorative area, also serving as a viewpoint. The pit's remains include the railway ramp and a concrete "bunker".

The unveiling of the spatial-monumental complex did not end the activities of "grave hyenas". The last documented desecration of the camp area occurred in 2002, when unknown perpetrators dug up the graves of guards in Maliszewski Forest.

In 2010, the Museum of Struggle and Martyrdom in Treblinka gained a fully functional museum building with a permanent exhibition. One of its exhibits is dedicated to the labor camp.

Every year, on the first Saturday of September, local commemorations take place at the former labor camp site with the participation of local residents and former prisoners. This tradition dates back to the early 1980s. Initially organized from the grassroots, since the 1990s the Treblinka museum has been involved in organizing these events. The central element of the commemoration is the Stations of the Cross, starting at the former gravel pit and ending with a mass at the execution site monument.

During research seasons in 2010, 2012, and 2013, the areas of the former Treblinka I and II camps and the Maliszewski Forest execution site were subjects of forensic archaeology research led by Dr. Caroline Sturdy Colls from Staffordshire University in the United Kingdom. This included archival queries, witness interviews, and various forms of non-invasive archaeological research. In 2013, small test excavations were also conducted. Research on the Treblinka I camp site corrected erroneous assumptions about the exact location of some structures and found traces of camp boundaries and roads. In Maliszewski Forest, three previously unknown mass graves were discovered.

=== Last prisoners ===
The last surviving former prisoner of the Treblinka penal labor camp was likely Zygmunt Chłopek, who died on 31 December 2021. Born in 1925, he was deported to the camp on 9 June 1943, following a roundup in Rogów, during which 88 people were arrested, including native Rogów residents and temporary inhabitants. He was a guest of honor at the annual September commemorations at the Treblinka Museum for many years.

== Fate of the perpetrators ==
The camp commandant, Theodor van Eupen, was likely killed by a Soviet partisan unit Vanguard led by Wasilij Tichonin in an ambush near the village of Lipówka on 11 December 1944. Some sources indicate that the information about the commandant's death in this skirmish is not unequivocally confirmed, but others suggest that van Eupen's identity was established based on documents found on his body.

During preparations for the first trial of the Treblinka extermination camp staff, West German investigators also focused on three SS men from the labor camp staff: Karl Prefi, Hans Heinbuch, and Johann Röge. An indictment against them and eleven members of the extermination camp staff was filed on 29 January 1963. Prefi, Heinbuch, and Röge were charged with co-complicity in murder. Ultimately, all three were deemed unfit to stand trial due to poor health. Despite evidence of Prefi's crimes, he only appeared as a witness in the trial of SS men from Treblinka II.

== Bibliography ==
- Bartoszewski, Władysław (1970). Warszawski pierścień śmierci 1939–1944 (in Polish). Warsaw: Interpress.
- Bryant, Michael S. (2014). Eyewitness to Genocide: The Operation Reinhard Death Camp Trials, 1955–1966. Knoxville: The University of Tennessee Press. ISBN 978-1-62190-070-2.
- Black, Peter (2004). "Prosty żołnierz "akcji Reinhardt". Oddziały z Trawnik i eksterminacja polskich Żydów". In Libionka, Dariusz (ed.). Akcja Reinhardt. Zagłada Żydów w Generalnym Gubernatorstwie (in Polish). Warsaw: Instytut Pamięci Narodowej. ISBN 83-89078-68-6.
- Colls, Caroline Strudy (2015). "Badania archeologiczne w obozie zagłady i karnym obozie pracy w Treblince". In Kopówka, Edward (ed.). Treblinka: historia i pamięć (in Polish). Siedlce: Muzeum Regionalne w Siedlcach. ISBN 978-83-88761-51-5.
- Grabowski, Jan (2007). "Żydzi przed obliczem niemieckich i polskich sądów w dystrykcie warszawskim Generalnego Gubernatorstwa, 1939–1942". In Engelking, Barbara; Leociak, Jacek; Libionka, Dariusz (eds.). Prowincja noc. Życie i zagłada Żydów w dystrykcie warszawskim (in Polish). Warsaw: Centrum Badań nad Zagładą Żydów IFiS PAN. ISBN 978-83-63444-03-7.
- Kopówka, Edward; Rytel-Andrianik, Paweł (2011). Dam im imię na wieki. Polacy z okolic Treblinki ratujący Żydów (in Polish). Oxford–Treblinka: Wydawnictwo Sióstr Loretanek. ISBN 978-83-7257-496-1.
- Kopówka, Edward (2013). "Karny obóz pracy w Treblince". Co wiemy o Treblince? Stan badań (in Polish). Siedlce: Muzeum Regionalne w Siedlcach. ISBN 978-83-88761-38-6.
- Kopówka, Edward (2002). Treblinka – nigdy więcej (in Polish). Siedlce: Muzeum Regionalne w Siedlcach. ISBN 83-88761-15-3.
- Rusiniak, Martyna (2008). Obóz zagłady Treblinka II w pamięci społecznej (1943–1989) (in Polish). Warsaw: Wydawnictwo Neriton. ISBN 978-83-7543-020-2.
- Rusiniak, Martyna (2013). "Okres profanacji i zapomnienia. Treblinka II". In Kopówka, Edward (ed.). Co wiemy o Treblince? Stan badań (in Polish). Siedlce: Muzeum Regionalne w Siedlcach. ISBN 978-83-88761-38-6.
- Webb, Chris; Chocholatý, Michal (2014). The Treblinka death camp. History, Biographies, Remembrance. Stuttgart: ibidem-Verlag. ISBN 978-3-8382-0656-1.
- Witt, Kazimierz (1970). "Działalność okupanta hitlerowskiego w powiecie Sokołów Podlaski w latach 1939–1944". Rocznik Mazowiecki (in Polish). 3.
- Zawadka, Artur (2015). "Upamiętnianie Treblinki". In Kopówka, Edward (ed.). Treblinka: historia i pamięć (in Polish). Siedlce: Muzeum Regionalne w Siedlcach. ISBN 978-83-88761-51-5.
- Ząbecki, Franciszek (1977). Wspomnienia dawne i nowe (in Polish). Warsaw: Pax.
