= Chruszczewka =

Chruszczewka may refer to the following places in Poland:

- Chruszczewka Szlachecka
- Chruszczewka Włościańska
