= Dębe, Sokołów County =

Dębe
- Village
- Location within Poland
- Coordinates: 52°35′2″N 22°4′47″E
- Country: Poland
- Voivodeship: Masovian
- County: Sokołów
- Gmina: Kosów Lacki
- Population: 220

Dębe [ˈdɛmbɛ] is a village in the administrative district of Gmina Kosów Lacki, within Sokołów County, Masovian Voivodeship, in east-central Poland.
