= Kosów-Hulidów =

Village in Gmina Kosów Lacki, Poland

- Village
- Location within Poland
- Coordinates: 52°35′21″N 22°10′41″E
- Country: Poland
- Voivodeship: Masovian
- County: Sokołów
- Gmina: Kosów Lacki

Kosów-Hulidów [ˈkɔsuf xuˈliduf] is a village in the administrative district of Gmina Kosów Lacki, within Sokołów County, Masovian Voivodeship, in east-central Poland.
