= Theodor van Eupen =

SS officer

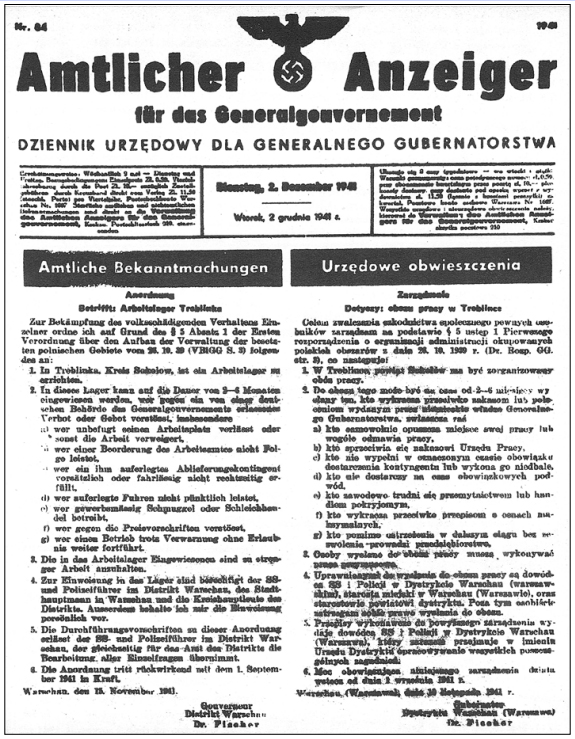
- Announcement about the founding of Treblinka Arbeitslager run by Eupen
- Born: 24 April 1907; Düsseldorf, Germany
- Died: 11 December 1944 (aged 37); Lipówka, near Jędrzejów, Poland
- Military career
- Allegiance: Nazi Germany
- Branch: Schutzstaffel (SS)
- Rank: Sturmbannführer
- Unit: SS-Totenkopfverbände
- Commands: Deputy commandant of Treblinka extermination camp

Theodor van Eupen (24 April 1907 – 11 December 1944) was a member of the SS of Nazi Germany. A Holocaust perpetrator, he served as the commandant of the Treblinka I forced-labour camp (Arbeitslager) in occupied Poland during its entire course of operation. Unlike the parallel Treblinka extermination camp (Treblinka II) subordinate to the Operation Reinhard authorities in Berlin, Treblinka I was controlled by the SS and Police Leader in Warsaw. The labour camp was liquidated on 23 July 1944, ahead of the Soviet advance. By then, more than half of its cumulative number of some 20,000 inmates had died from summary executions, hunger, disease, and mistreatment. The regular workforce consisted of 1,000–2,000 prisoners, terrorized by staff of about a dozen SS-men and 100 Wachmänner guards.

== Career ==
Born in Düsseldorf, Eupen received a law degree before World War II similar to other notable members of the Nazi Party such as Hans Frank, head of the semi-colonial General Government. Eupen joined the Schutzstaffel with the card number 4528. After the invasion of Poland, he was promoted to the position of Commandant of Treblinka I in the summer of 1941, ahead of the camp's official founding which took place in November 1941. He supervised the building of barracks as well as barbed wire fencing 2 metres (6 ft 7 in) tall, around the perimeter.

Treblinka I was a gravel quarry equipped with heavy machinery, essential to the production of concrete and road construction. Before the German occupation, the mega quarry was owned by the Polish industrialist Marian Łopuszyński who built a railway track connecting the mine with Małkinia–Sokołów Podlaski junction. Setting up a penal colony there was the idea of Sturmbannführer Ernst Gramss who first ran it as his own personal business venture in occupied Poland. The quarry became vital during the German attack on the Soviet Union, supplying gravel for the strategic road-building programme around the German–Soviet border.

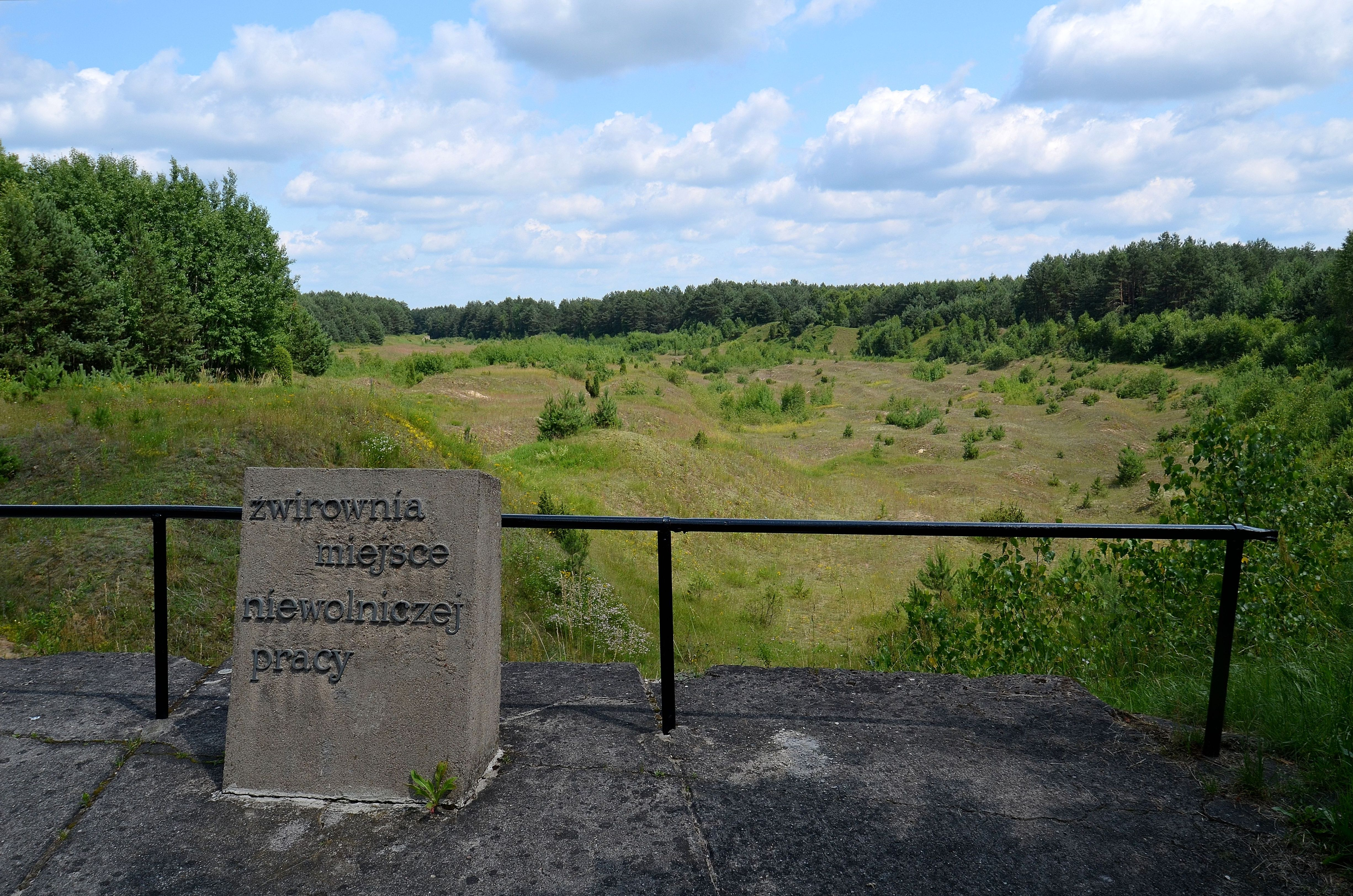
Historic site of Treblinka I Arbeitslager run by Eupen; with the memorial stone.

Eupen was in charge of Treblinka I officially from 15 November 1941 (date of the camp's founding by Warsaw SS Governor Dr. Ludwig Fischer), until its closing on 23 July 1944. He worked closely with the SS and police commandanture in Warsaw during the deportation of Jews to the gas chambers of Treblinka II in early 1943, in order to have the slave labour brought to him from the Warsaw Ghetto for necessary replacements. He claimed to have been a German-Dutch aristocrat and liked to have his wife and two little sons visit him in occupied Poland. Eupen was feared even by his own SS subordinates penalized by being sent to the Eastern Front for even the smallest infractions. He arranged to have a garden built by his house with a pond and water fowl.

Reportedly well-mannered, Eupen nevertheless had a reputation of a notorious sadist who often personally executed prisoners, "taking shots at them, as if they were partridges" wrote Franciszek Ząbecki, the Polish station master. Prisoners who worked 12- to 14-hour shifts received watery soup for breakfast, similar soup for lunch, and the roasted-grain beverage with rye bread for supper, each loaf shared by the 10 of them. During the liquidation of the camp, some 500–700 inmates were executed by the SS in the forest, and all structures were burned to the ground. Eupen's luck ended shortly thereafter.

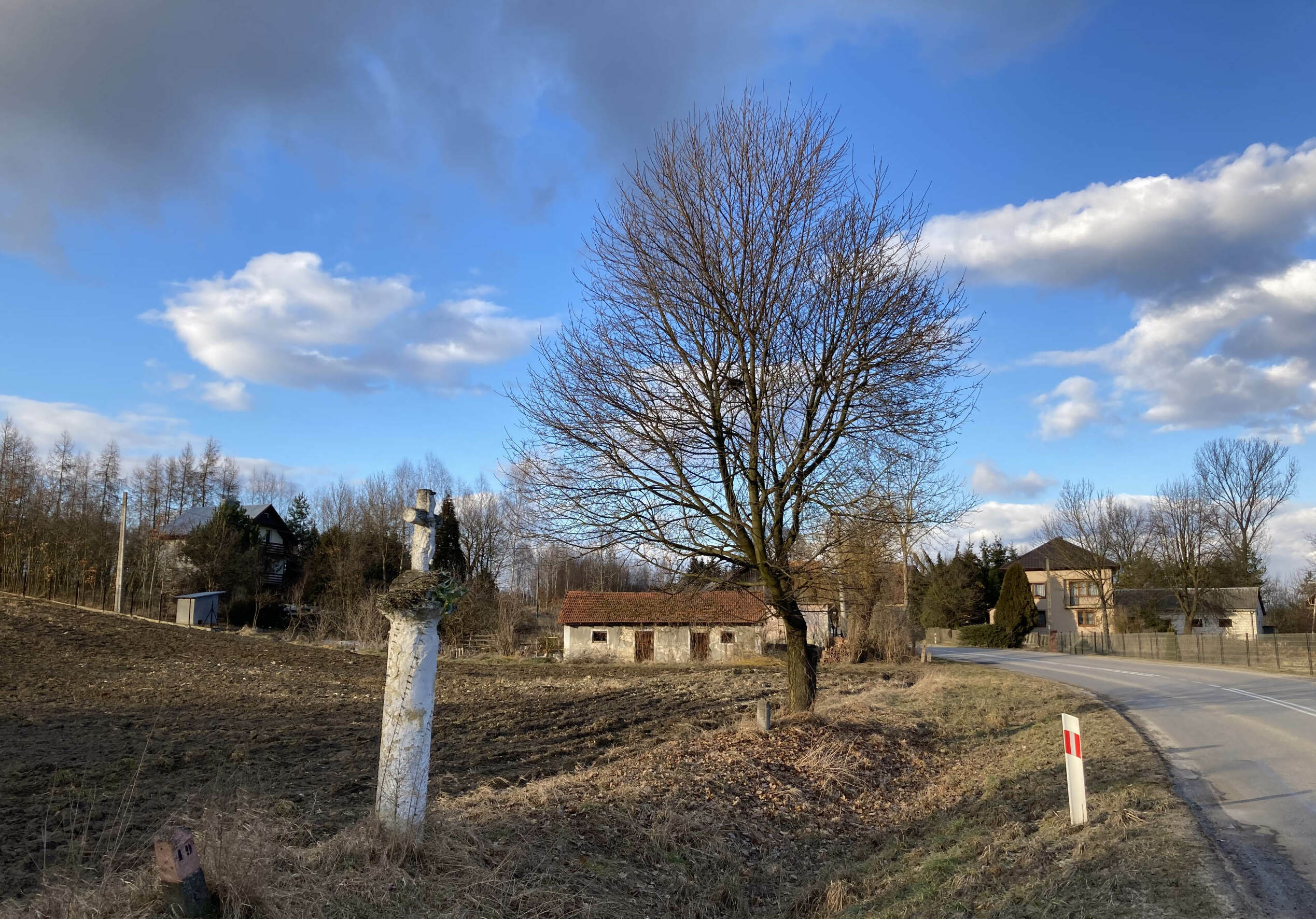
Lipówka, the place of death of Theo van Eupen

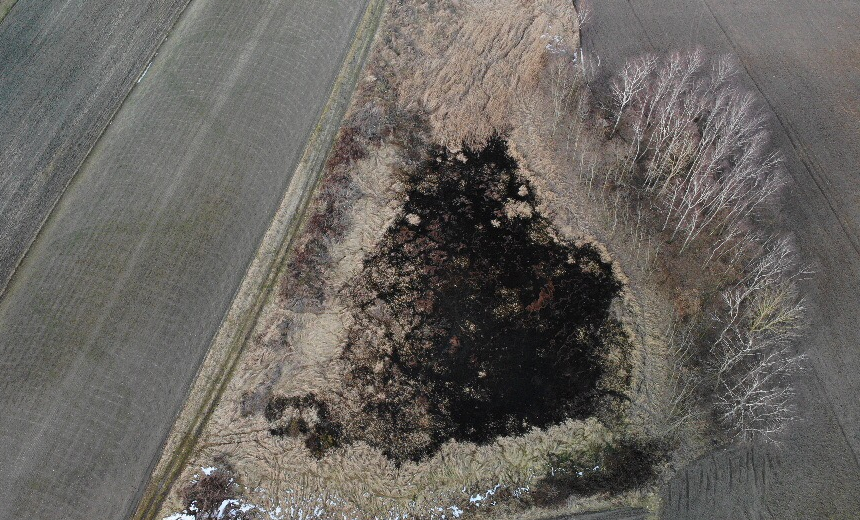
Lake Rachwalec, the place where the body of Theo van Eupen was hidden on 11 December 1944

He was killed by Polish partisans near Jędrzejów in mid December 1944, ambushed on the road. He jumped out of the car and ran on foot as far as Lipówka village where he crawled under a pile of hay. The partisans machine-gunned his hiding place and learned who he was only from the documents they found on his corpse.

The next day, the corpse and 3 other Germans killed in the ambush were recovered from the lake by a specially arrived German unit and transported to Lipówka and then to Jędrzejów, where he was to be buried on 13 December 1944. According to Norbert Michta, the Germans then selected 13 people from among the local population to be shot. However, the Nazis managed to be convinced that the attack was the work of Russian paratroopers unknown to the people, and W. Ważniewski, on the basis of Reports and German documents, reports that they took nine village leaders from nearby villages hostage, but after four days they released them.

On 13 December, the Germans launched operation "Schneesturm", which was aimed at liquidating Soviet partisans staying in the vicinity of the Sancygniów forests, attacked from three directions, from the Mountains through Lipówka to Teodorów, from the side of Działoszyce and from the side of Książ Wielki through Janowice and Rzemiędzice, they pacified several surrounding villages, m.in Trzonów, located 6 km from the assassination site, Bugaj, Gaik-hamlet Zaryszyna, Sadek and killed at least 64 inhabitants of these villages and burned many buildings.
