= Bojary, Masovian Voivodeship =

Bojary
- Village
- Location within Poland
- Coordinates: 52°41′N 22°5′E
- Country: Poland
- Voivodeship: Masovian
- County: Sokołów
- Gmina: Kosów Lacki
- Population (approx.): 100

Bojary [bɔˈjarɨ] is a village in the administrative district of Gmina Kosów Lacki, within Sokołów County, Masovian Voivodeship, in east-central Poland.

The village lies south of the river Bug, at an approximate elevation of 100 m above sea level.
