= Kosów Ruski =

- Village
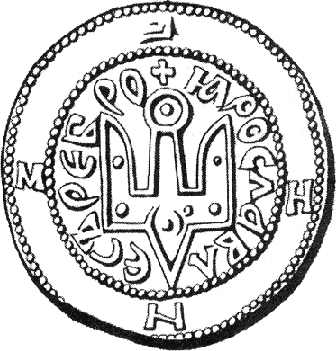
- Coat of arms

- Location within Poland
- Coordinates: 52°35′N 22°7′E
- Country: Poland
- Voivodeship: Masovian
- County: Sokołów
- Gmina: Kosów Lacki

Kosów Ruski [ˈkɔsuf ˈruski] is a village in the administrative district of Gmina Kosów Lacki, within Sokołów County, Masovian Voivodeship, in east-central Poland.
