= Łomna, Sokołów County =

Łomna
- Village
- Location within Poland
- Coordinates: 52°34′N 22°12′E
- Country: Poland
- Voivodeship: Masovian
- County: Sokołów
- Gmina: Kosów Lacki

Łomna [ˈwɔmna] is a village in the administrative district of Gmina Kosów Lacki, within Sokołów County, Masovian Voivodeship, in east-central Poland.
