= Dybów, Masovian Voivodeship =

Dybów
- Village
- Location within Poland
- Coordinates: 52°31′N 22°11′E
- Country: Poland
- Voivodeship: Masovian
- County: Sokołów
- Gmina: Kosów Lacki
- Population: 300
- Time zone: CEST (Central European Summer Time)

Dybów [ˈdɨbuf] is a village in the administrative district of Gmina Kosów Lacki, within Sokołów County, Masovian Voivodeship, in east-central Poland.
