= Jakubiki =

- Village
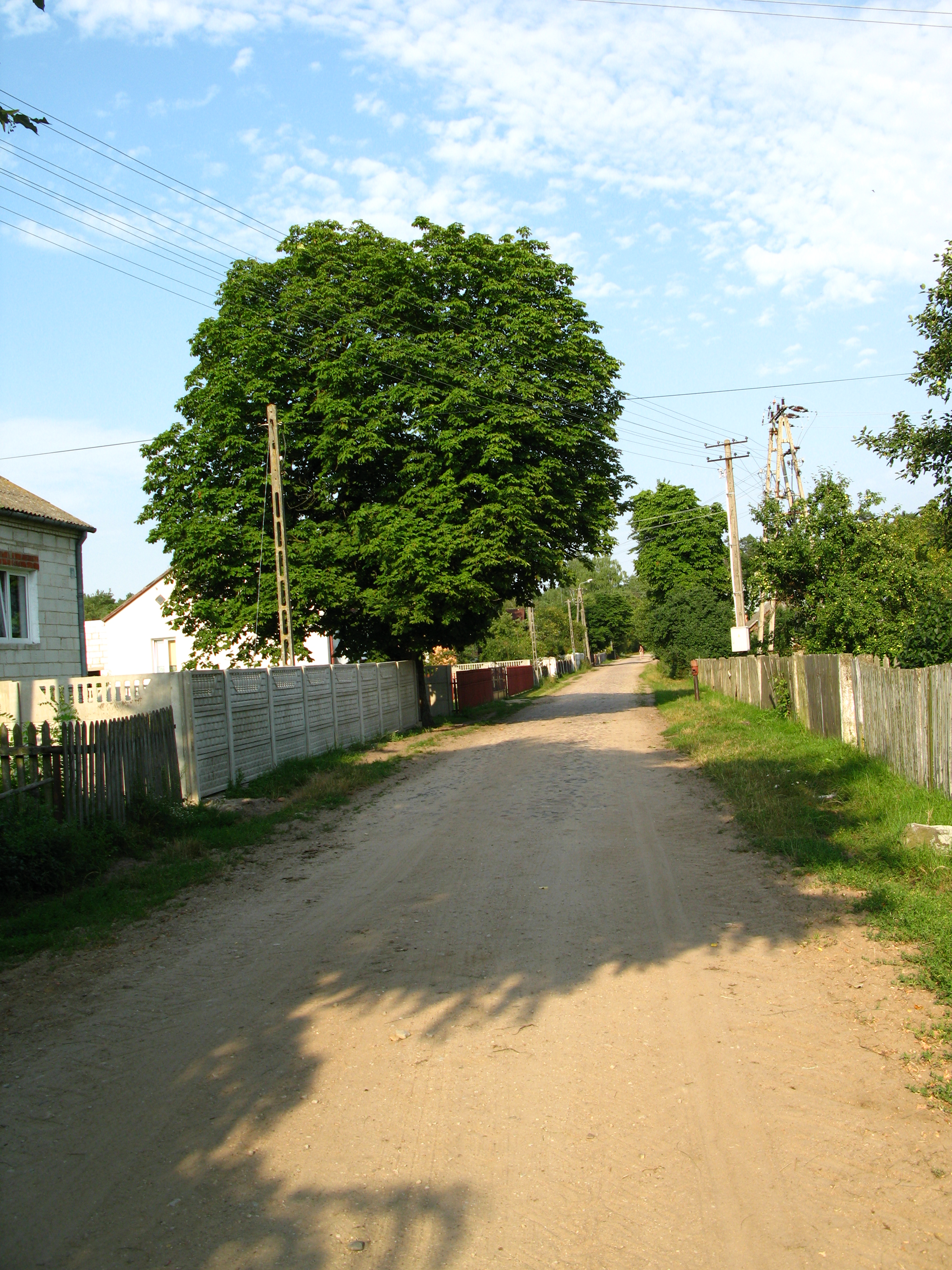

- Location within Poland
- Coordinates: 52°38′32.18″N 22°7′1.27″E
- Country: Poland
- Voivodeship: Masovian
- County: Sokołów
- Gmina: Kosów Lacki
- Population (approx.): 100

Jakubiki [jakuˈbiki] is a village in the administrative district of Gmina Kosów Lacki, within Sokołów County, Masovian Voivodeship, in east-central Poland.
