= Żochy, Sokołów County =

Żochy
- Village
- Location within Poland
- Coordinates: 52°39′N 22°11′E
- Country: Poland
- Voivodeship: Masovian
- County: Sokołów
- Gmina: Kosów Lacki

Żochy [ˈʐɔxɨ] is a village in the administrative district of Gmina Kosów Lacki, within Sokołów County, Masovian Voivodeship, in east-central Poland.
