= Tosie =

- Village
- Location within Poland
- Coordinates: 52°38′N 22°9′E
- Country: Poland
- Voivodeship: Masovian
- County: Sokołów
- Gmina: Kosów Lacki
- Time zone: UTC+1 (CET)
  - Summer (DST): UTC+2 (CEST)

Tosie [ˈtɔɕɛ] is a village in the administrative district of Gmina Kosów Lacki, within Sokołów County, Masovian Voivodeship, in east-central Poland.

Six Polish citizens were murdered by Nazi Germany in the village during World War II.
