= Albinów, Sokołów County =

Albinów
- Village
- Location within Poland
- Coordinates: 52°36′17″N 22°8′36″E
- Country: Poland
- Voivodeship: Masovian
- County: Sokołów
- Gmina: Kosów Lacki

Albinów [alˈbinuf] is a village in the administrative district of Gmina Kosów Lacki, within Sokołów County, Masovian Voivodeship, in east-central Poland.
