= Guty, Sokołów County =

Guty
- Village
- Location within Poland
- Coordinates: 52°36′N 22°5′E
- Country: Poland
- Voivodeship: Masovian
- County: Sokołów
- Gmina: Kosów Lacki

Guty [ˈɡutɨ] is a village in the administrative district of Gmina Kosów Lacki, within Sokołów County, Masovian Voivodeship, in east-central Poland.
