= Buczyn Szlachecki =

- Village
- Location within Poland
- Coordinates: 52°31′N 22°13′E
- Country: Poland
- Voivodeship: Masovian
- County: Sokołów
- Gmina: Kosów Lacki

Buczyn Szlachecki (Polish pronunciation: [ˈbutʂɨn ʂlaˈxɛtskʲi]) is a village in the administrative district of Gmina Kosów Lacki, within Sokołów County, Masovian Voivodeship, in east-central Poland.
