= Henrysin, Sokołów County =

Henrysin
- Village
- Location within Poland
- Coordinates: 52°35′45″N 22°11′2″E
- Country: Poland
- Voivodeship: Masovian
- County: Sokołów
- Gmina: Kosów Lacki

Henrysin [xɛnˈrɨɕin] is a village in the administrative district of Gmina Kosów Lacki, within Sokołów County, Masovian Voivodeship, in east-central Poland.
