= Nowy Buczyn =

- Village
- Location within Poland
- Coordinates: 52°31′27″N 22°12′09″E
- Country: Poland
- Voivodeship: Masovian
- County: Sokołów
- Gmina: Kosów Lacki

Nowy Buczyn [ˈnɔvɨ ˈbut͡ʂɨn] is a village in the administrative district of Gmina Kosów Lacki, within Sokołów County, Masovian Voivodeship, in east-central Poland.
