= Nowa Wieś Kosowska =

- Village
- Location within Poland
- Coordinates: 52°35′1″N 22°13′5″E
- Country: Poland
- Voivodeship: Masovian
- County: Sokołów
- Gmina: Kosów Lacki
- Population: 240

Nowa Wieś Kosowska [ˈnɔva ˈvjɛɕ kɔˈsɔfska] is a village in the administrative district of Gmina Kosów Lacki, within Sokołów County, Masovian Voivodeship, in east-central Poland.
