= Krupy, Masovian Voivodeship =

Krupy
- Village
- Location within Poland
- Coordinates: 52°38′N 22°7′E
- Country: Poland
- Voivodeship: Masovian
- County: Sokołów
- Gmina: Kosów Lacki
- Population: 55

Krupy [ˈkrupɨ] is a village in the administrative district of Gmina Kosów Lacki, within Sokołów County, Masovian Voivodeship, in east-central Poland.
