= Wyszomierz, Gmina Kosów Lacki =

Wyszomierz
- Village
- Location within Poland
- Coordinates: 52°31′25″N 22°07′10″E
- Country: Poland
- Voivodeship: Masovian
- County: Sokołów
- Gmina: Kosów Lacki

Wyszomierz [vɨˈʂɔmjɛʂ] is a village in the administrative district of Gmina Kosów Lacki, within Sokołów County, Masovian Voivodeship, in east-central Poland.
