= Sągole =

- Village
- Location within Poland
- Coordinates: 52°30′N 22°9′E
- Country: Poland
- Voivodeship: Masovian
- County: Sokołów
- Gmina: Kosów Lacki

Sągole [sɔŋˈɡɔlɛ] is a village in the administrative district of Gmina Kosów Lacki, within Sokołów County, Masovian Voivodeship, in east-central Poland.
