= Telaki =

- Village
- Location within Poland
- Coordinates: 52°34′N 22°10′E
- Country: Poland
- Voivodeship: Masovian
- County: Sokołów
- Gmina: Kosów Lacki
- Population: 760

Telaki [tɛˈlaki] is a village in the administrative district of Gmina Kosów Lacki, within Sokołów County, Masovian Voivodeship, in east-central Poland.
