= Franciszek Strynkiewicz =

Polish sculptor

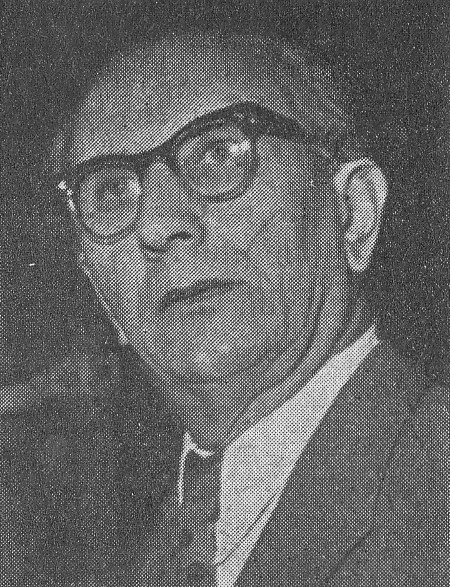
Franciszek Strynkiewicz

Franciszek Strynkiewicz (September 15, 1893 – November 20, 1996) was a Polish sculptor. He submitted some of his work into an unknown category of the art competitions at the 1932 Summer Olympics and the "Statues" category of the art competitions at the 1948 Summer Olympics, but did not win a medal.

Born in 1893 in Mogielnica, he began sculpting during his childhood as a way to entertain himself without toys. He moved to Warsaw in 1905 and began studying at the Society for Educational Courses in 1914. He served as a member of the Polish Land Forces during World War I and through 1920, at which point he began working in a laboratory at the State Epidemic Center in Warsaw. He entered the Academy of Fine Arts in Warsaw in 1923, taking night classes so as not to lose his job. During the period from 1927 until the onset of World War II he exhibited his sculptures across Europe, but he spent the conflict itself as a civilian prisoner of war in work camps. Following the war, in 1946, Strynkiewicz was appointed a professor at the academy. He died in November 1996, in Warsaw, at the age of 103.
