= Chruszczewka Szlachecka =

- Village
- Location within Poland
- Coordinates: 52°32′33″N 22°05′36″E
- Country: Poland
- Voivodeship: Masovian
- County: Sokołów
- Gmina: Kosów Lacki

Chruszczewka Szlachecka [xruʂˈt͡ʂɛfka ʂlaˈxɛt͡ska] is a village in the administrative district of Gmina Kosów Lacki, within Sokołów County, Masovian Voivodeship, in east-central Poland.
