= Wólka Okrąglik =

- Village
- Location within Poland
- Coordinates: 52°38′N 22°5′E
- Country: Poland
- Voivodeship: Masovian
- County: Sokołów
- Gmina: Kosów Lacki

Wólka Okrąglik [ˈvulka ɔˈkrɔŋɡlik] is a village in the administrative district of Gmina Kosów Lacki, within Sokołów County, Masovian Voivodeship, in east-central Poland.
