= Chruszczewka Włościańska =

- Village
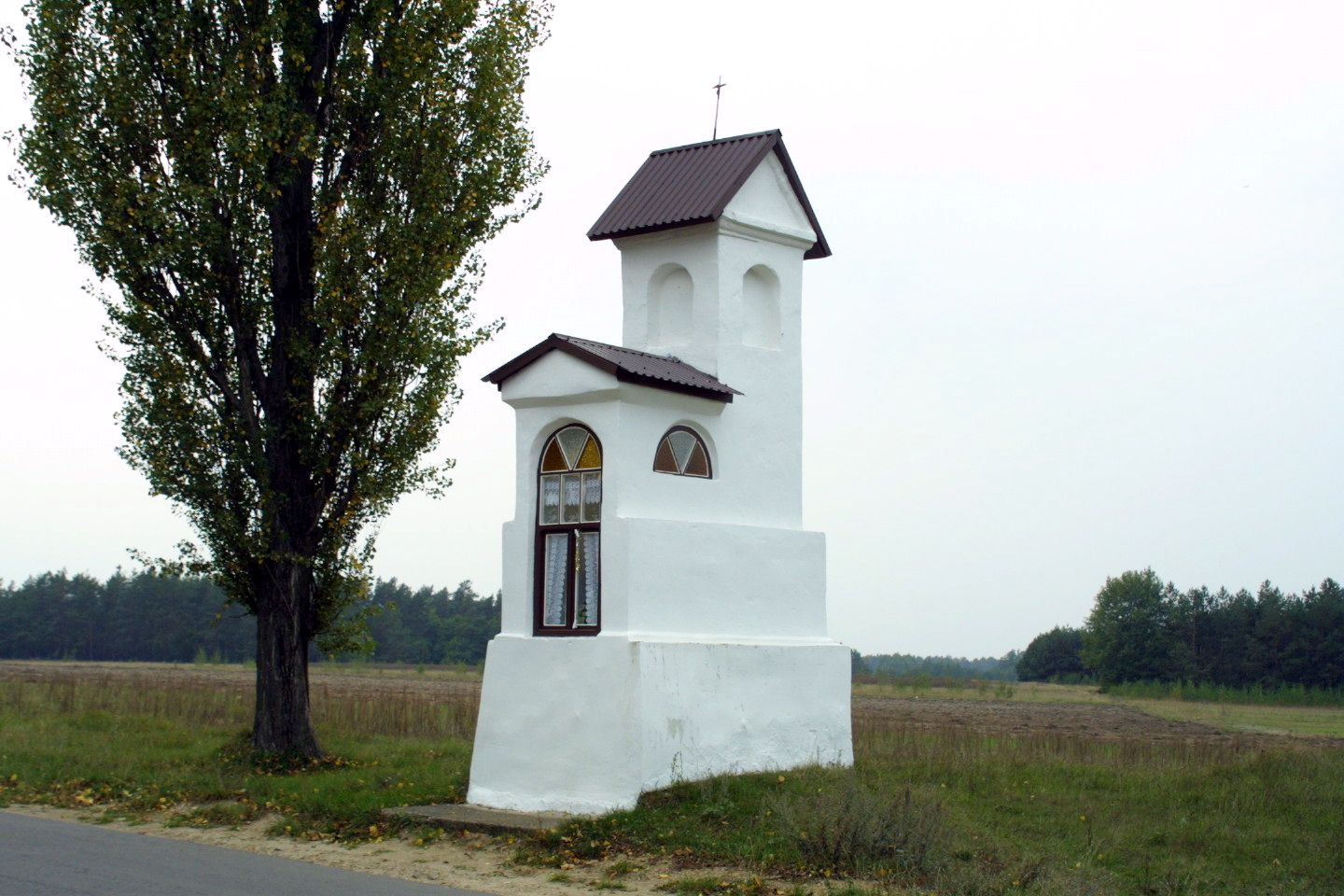

- Location within Poland
- Coordinates: 52°32′20″N 22°05′35″E
- Country: Poland
- Voivodeship: Masovian
- County: Sokołów
- Gmina: Kosów Lacki

Chruszczewka Włościańska (Polish pronunciation: [xruʂˈtʂɛfka vwɔɕˈtɕaj̃ska]) is a village in the administrative district of Gmina Kosów Lacki, within Sokołów County, Masovian Voivodeship, in east-central Poland.
