= Gmina Kosów Lacki =

Gmina Kosów Lacki Kosów Lacki Commune
- Gmina
- Coat of arms
- Interactive map of Gmina Kosów Lacki
- Coordinates (Kosów Lacki): 52°36′N 22°9′E
- Country: Poland
- Voivodeship: Masovian
- County: Sokołów
- Seat: Kosów Lacki

Area
  - Total: 200.17 km^{2} (77.29 sq mi)

Population (2013)
  - Total: 6,423
  - Density: 32.09/km^{2} (83.11/sq mi)
  - Urban: 2,187
  - Rural: 4,236
- Website: http://www.kosowlacki.pl/

Gmina Kosów Lacki is an urban-rural gmina (administrative district) in Sokołów County, Masovian Voivodeship, in east-central Poland. Its seat is the town of Kosów Lacki, which lies approximately 23 kilometres (14 mi) north of Sokołów Podlaski and 89 km (55 mi) north-east of Warsaw.

The gmina covers an area of 200.17 square kilometres (77.3 sq mi), and as of 2006 its total population is 6,629 (out of which the population of Kosów Lacki amounts to 2,135, and the population of the rural part of the gmina is 4,494).

== Villages ==
Apart from the town of Kosów Lacki, Gmina Kosów Lacki contains the villages and settlements of Albinów, Bojary, Buczyn Dworski, Buczyn Szlachecki, Chruszczewka Szlachecka, Chruszczewka Włościańska, Dębe, Dybów, Grzymały, Guty, Henrysin, Jakubiki, Kosów Ruski, Kosów-Hulidów, Krupy, Kutyski, Łomna, Nowa Maliszewa, Nowa Wieś Kosowska, Nowy Buczyn, Rytele Święckie, Sągole, Stara Maliszewa, Telaki, Tosie, Trzciniec Duży, Trzciniec Mały, Wólka Dolna, Wólka Okrąglik, Wyszomierz and Żochy.

== Neighbouring gminas ==
Gmina Kosów Lacki is bordered by the gminas of Ceranów, Małkinia Górna, Miedzna, Sabnie, Sadowne, Sokołów Podlaski, Sterdyń and Stoczek.
