= Bukovice =

Bukovice may refer to places in the Czech Republic:

- Bukovice (Brno-Country District), a municipality and village in the South Moravian Region
- Bukovice (Náchod District), a municipality and village in the Hradec Králové Region
- Bukovice, a village and part of Bžany (Teplice District) in the Ústí nad Labem Region
- Bukovice, a village and part of Jeseník in the Olomouc Region
- Bukovice, a village and part of Písařov in the Olomouc Region
- Bukovice, a village and part of Velké Losiny in the Olomouc Region

== See also ==
- Bukowice (disambiguation)
