= Jabłonna =

Jabłonna may refer to several places in Poland:

- Jabłonna, Łęczyca County in Łódź Voivodeship (central Poland)
- Jabłonna, Radomsko County in Łódź Voivodeship (central Poland)
- Jabłonna, Lublin Voivodeship (east Poland)
- Jabłonna, Świętokrzyskie Voivodeship (south-central Poland)
- Jabłonna, Białobrzegi County in Masovian Voivodeship (east-central Poland)
- Jabłonna, Legionowo County in Masovian Voivodeship (east-central Poland)
- Jabłonna, Radom County in Masovian Voivodeship (east-central Poland)
- Jabłonna, Węgrów County in Masovian Voivodeship (east-central Poland)
- Jabłonna, Gmina Rakoniewice, Grodzisk County in Greater Poland Voivodeship (west-central Poland)
- Jabłonna, Leszno County in Greater Poland Voivodeship (west-central Poland)
- Jabłonna, Turek County in Greater Poland Voivodeship (west-central Poland)
- Jabłonna, Pomeranian Voivodeship (north Poland)
- Jabłonna Druga
- Jabłonna Lacka
- Jabłonna Średnia
- Stara Jabłonna
