= Monastery of Christ the Savior, Wirów =

Former Orthodox women's monastery in Wirów, Poland

Monastery of Christ the Savior
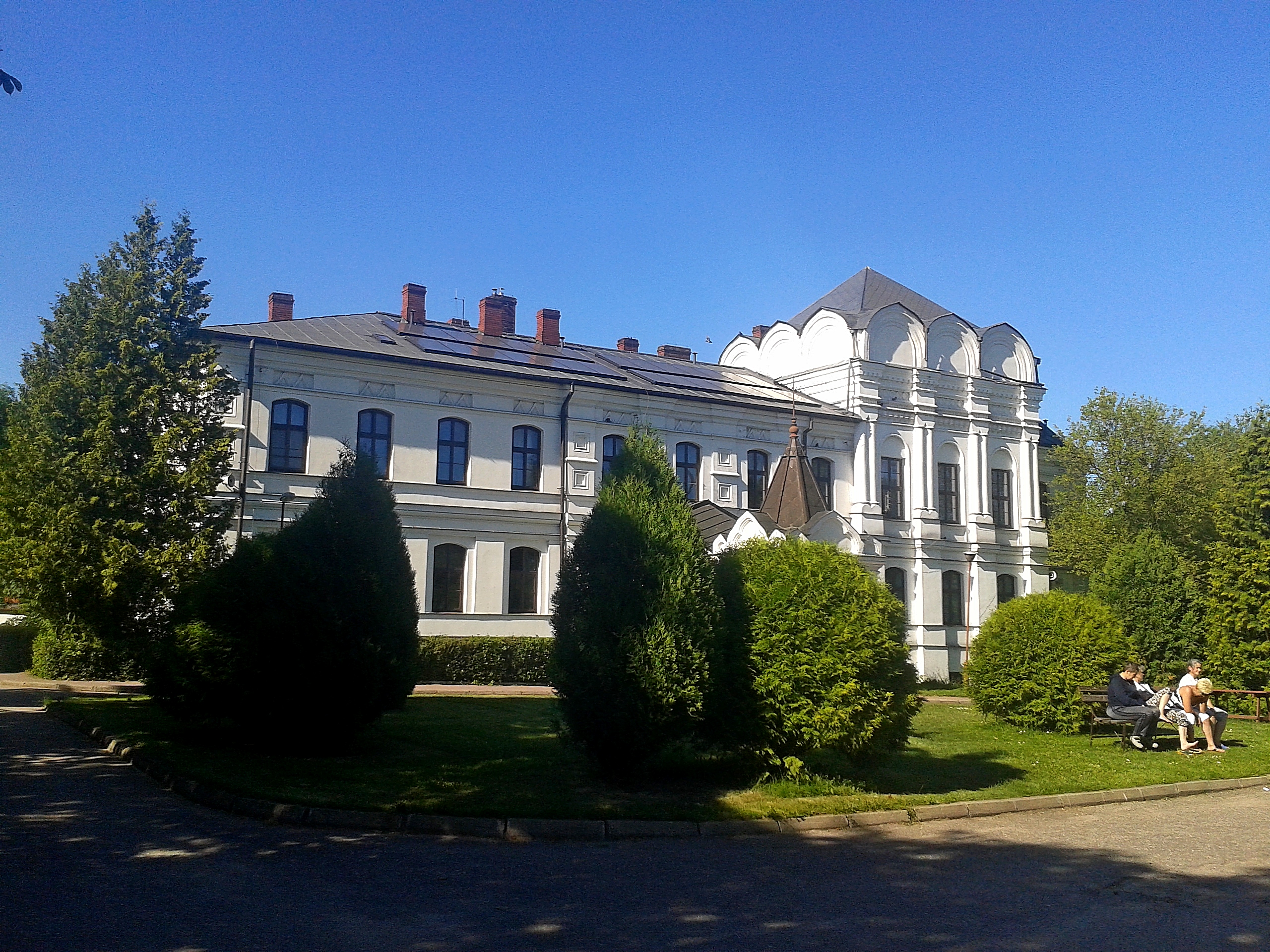
- Former main monastery building
- Interactive map of Monastery of Christ the Savior

Monastery information
- Order: Russian Orthodox Church
- Diocese: Eparchy of Warsaw
- Controlled churches: Church of Christ the All-Merciful Savior, Church of St. Seraphim of Sarov, Church of St. Leontius

People
- Founders: Archbishop Flavian Gorodetsky, nuns from the Monastery of the Nativity of the Theotokos in Leśna Podlaska

Architecture
- Heritage designation: 619, 4 April 1962
- Style: Russian Revival
- Completion date: 1890s
- Closed: 1915

Site
- Location: Wirów
- Country: Poland
- Coordinates: 52°26′26″N 22°32′20″E

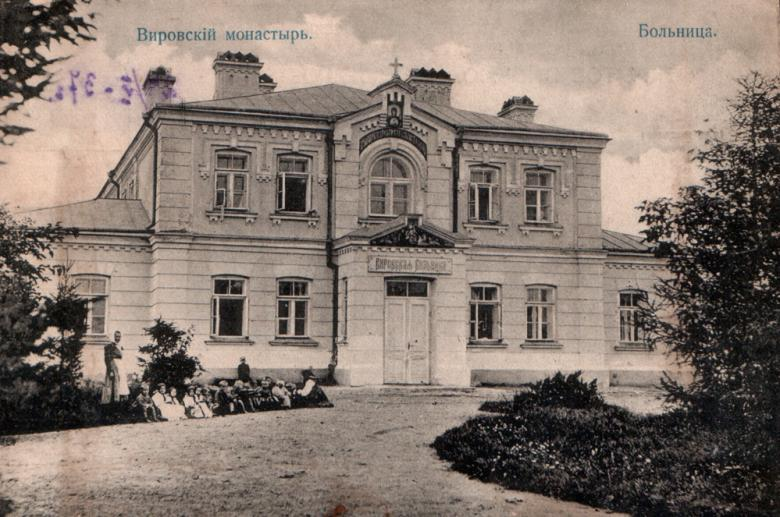
Clinic-hospital at the Wirów monastery. The upper part of the facade features the Our Lady of the Sign icon

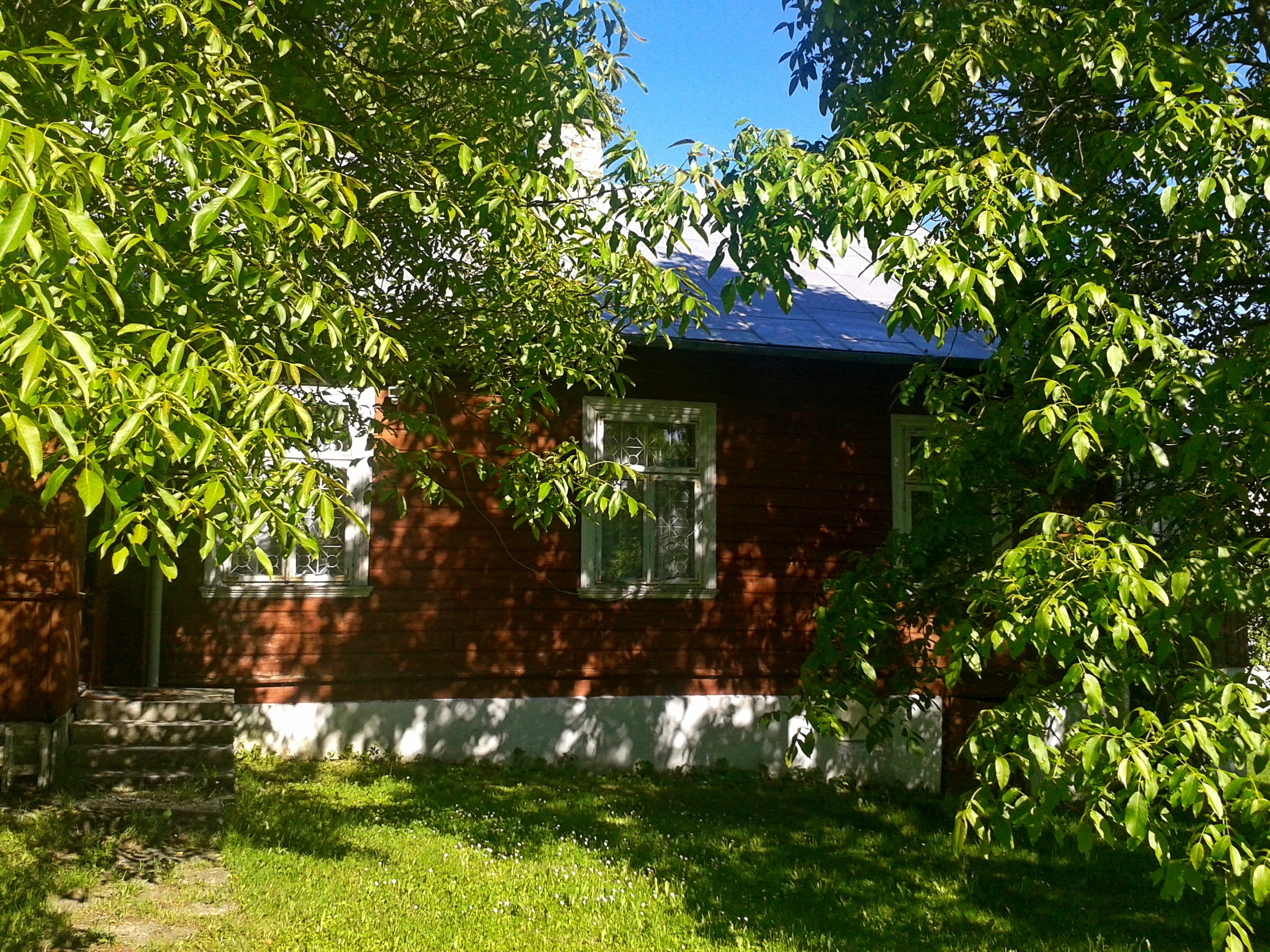
Former hegumenia's residence

The Monastery of Christ the Savior was an Orthodox women's monastery in Wirów, active from 1893 to 1915. It was one of the non-contemplative women's monasteries established in the western dioceses of the Russian Orthodox Church with support from Tsar Nicholas II and his wife, Alexandra Feodorovna. The nuns primarily engaged in social work, operating a school, hospital, pharmacy, and orphanage. The monastery was also founded to strengthen Orthodox and Russian cultural influence in territories annexed by the Russian Empire during the Partitions of Poland. It operated until the nuns fled during the mass evacuation during World War I, never returning.

After 1915, the monastery buildings housed charitable institutions, including schools and a care facility for children with special needs, run by the Felician Sisters and the Franciscan Sisters of the Family of Mary. In 1946, the buildings were nationalized and repurposed as an orphanage, later becoming a social care home.

== History ==
=== Establishment ===
In the latter half of the 19th century, the Russian Orthodox Church saw a significant increase in the number of monasteries and their inhabitants. A new type of monastery emerged, focused on social work rather than contemplation, a departure from traditional Russian Orthodox monasticism. These monasteries were primarily established in the western dioceses of the church, in territories acquired through the Partitions of Poland. They received substantial financial support from the Russian imperial family and wealthy private donors, who aimed to expand the influence of Orthodoxy and Russian culture in these regions. The first such non-contemplative monastery in the Eparchy of Warsaw was the Monastery of the Nativity of the Theotokos in Leśna Podlaska, established in 1889 and led by Hegumenia Catherine Yefimovskaya, who pioneered this socially engaged monastic model. Nuns from Leśna Podlaska later founded several similar monasteries in the diocese, including the Monastery of Christ the Savior in Wirów, the Monastery of the Transfiguration in Teolin, and the Monastery of St. Anthony in Radecznica. Urszula Pawluczuk notes that Tsarina Alexandra Feodorovna, a convert from Lutheranism to Orthodoxy, was a main patron of these monasteries and a fervent advocate for her adopted faith.

The Wirów monastery was established in 1894 as a branch of the Leśna Podlaska monastery. The official decree founding the women's monastery was issued a year earlier by Archbishop Flavian Gorodetsky. In autumn 1894, a nun from Leśna Podlaska, Anna Potto, appointed hegumenia on 18 September, arrived in Wirów with ten novices. The nuns brought a symbolic sum of one ruble from Leśna Podlaska. To support the fledgling community, which initially faced severe financial hardship, a fundraiser was organized, coordinated by the Siedlce dean, Father Naum Miziecki. The nuns initially resided in two houses, and a former Roman Catholic church was adapted for Orthodox services. Marko Poleszuk notes that, despite early financial struggles, the nuns provided aid to 30 of the poorest local children.

=== Activities of the monastery ===
Through Father Miziecki's fundraising efforts, the monastery attracted the attention of Saint John of Kronstadt, who provided financial support, and later Tsar Nicholas II, who personally donated 6,000 rubles and expressed admiration for the nuns' work. These funds enabled the construction of a new monastery complex in the Russian Revival style and the expansion of charitable activities modeled on the Leśna Podlaska monastery. The monastery school educated 23 boys and 88 girls, with additional lower-level schools in the villages of Mołożew and Wirów. According to Marko Poleszuk, the nuns did not force students to convert to Orthodoxy, and local peasants paid for their children's education with in-kind contributions.

In 1898, the monastery was recognized as an independent monastic community, and its superior was elevated to the rank of hegumenia. Five years later, Hegumenia Anna fell ill with tuberculosis and, despite treatment in Italy, died on 29 August 1903 at the age of 38. At the time of her death, she led a community of approximately 200 nuns, managing four schools, a hotel, a laundry, a bookbinding workshop, weaving, tailoring, and icon-painting studios, five residences for Orthodox clergy, a clinic serving 2,000 patients, an orphanage for 320 children, and a home for 30 elderly residents. Hegumenia Anna was buried in the monastery's main church. After her death, Hegumenia Zofia Szachowska took over, followed by Hegumenia Zuzanna Mielnikowa. The monastery housed around 200 nuns. It became a significant pilgrimage center, with the largest crowds visiting on the feast of the Seven Maccabean Martyrs (1 August in the Julian calendar). During Divine Liturgies, a 500-member choir performed.

The monastery operated in this manner until 1915, when the nuns fled to Moscow during the mass evacuation, hoping to return. In 1916, the monastery buildings were reclaimed by the Catholic Church, and the community was officially dissolved, preventing its reactivation.

=== Post-monastery use of the buildings ===
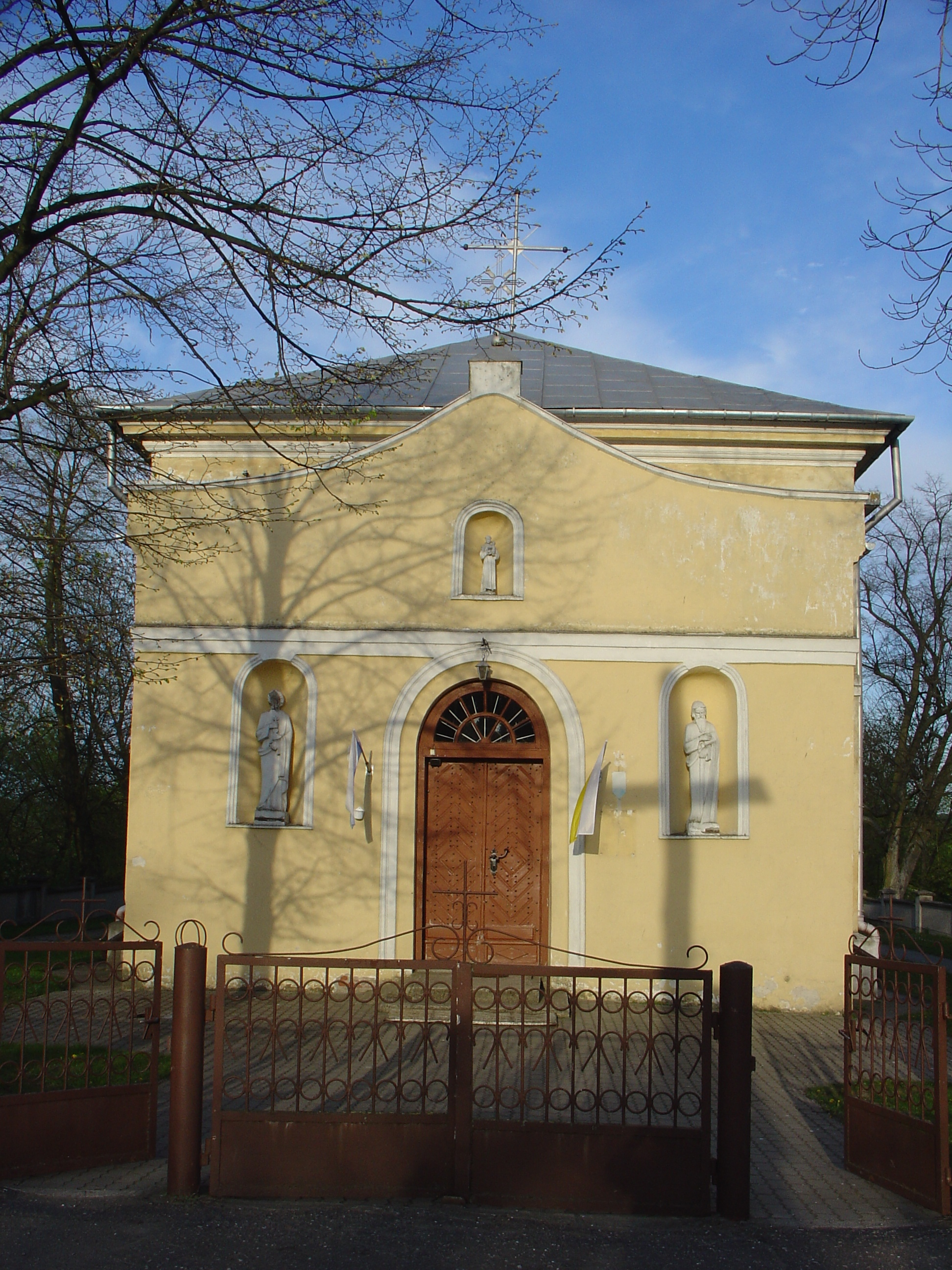
Church of St. Anthony of Padua, adapted from the monastery's Church of Christ the Savior, present-day view

After the Orthodox nuns departed, the Felician Sisters occupied the monastery buildings, establishing a teachers' seminary that operated until 1932. Subsequently, the buildings were repurposed as a primary school and a care facility for children with special needs, managed by the Franciscan Sisters of the Family of Mary. In 1946, the buildings were nationalized and converted into an orphanage. By 1958, the orphanage was closed, and the site became a facility for individuals struggling with alcoholism. As of 2010, the buildings function as a social care home.

The main monastery church, dedicated to Christ the Savior, was repurposed as a Catholic parish church under the patronage of Saint Anthony of Padua. Between 1994 and 2000, the parish renovated the second monastic church, formerly dedicated to Saint Seraphim of Sarov, for use as a rectory.

On 22 December 2004, the Polish Orthodox Church abandoned efforts to reclaim the Wirów properties in exchange for recovering a property in Warsaw at 15 Saints Cyril and Methodius Street, a former Orthodox student dormitory.

== Architecture ==
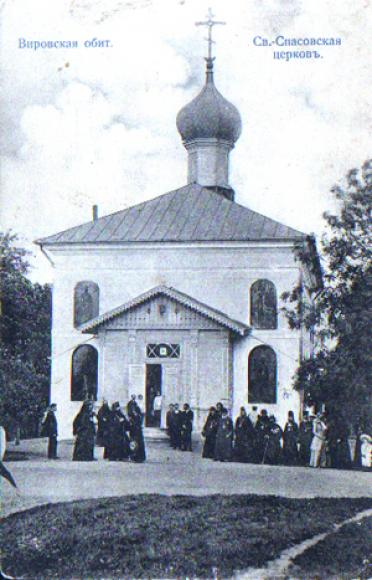
Church of Christ the Savior in the monastery complex, Russian postcard

The Wirów monastery complex comprised buildings for the nuns' social work, residential structures, and two churches: Christ the Savior and, built after 1903, Saint Seraphim of Sarov. A third church, dedicated to Saint Leontius of Rostov, was part of the school building. The entire complex was constructed in the Russian Revival style, characteristic of Russian Orthodox sacred architecture in the late 19th century. The nuns also created terraces along the Bug river and surrounded the complex with an orchard.

The monastery grounds included several Orthodox graves, including a marble tombstone for Hegumenia Anna Potto. The remains of those buried at the monastery were exhumed and reburied at the Grabarka Holy Mount, at the initiative of its hegumenia, Hermiona Szczur. According to Marko Poleszuk, these tombstones have been vandalized.
