= Guzy =

Guzy may refer to:

== Places ==
- Guzy, Podlaskie Voivodeship (north-east Poland)
- Guzy, Pomeranian Voivodeship (north Poland)
- Guzy, Warmian-Masurian Voivodeship (north Poland)
- Wierzbice-Guzy (east-central Poland)

== Other uses ==
- Guzy (surname)
