= Toczyski =

Toczyski may refer to the following places in Poland:

- Toczyski Podborne
- Toczyski Średnie
