= Alfreda and Bolesław Pietraszek =

Antonina Alfreda and Bolesław Pietraszek
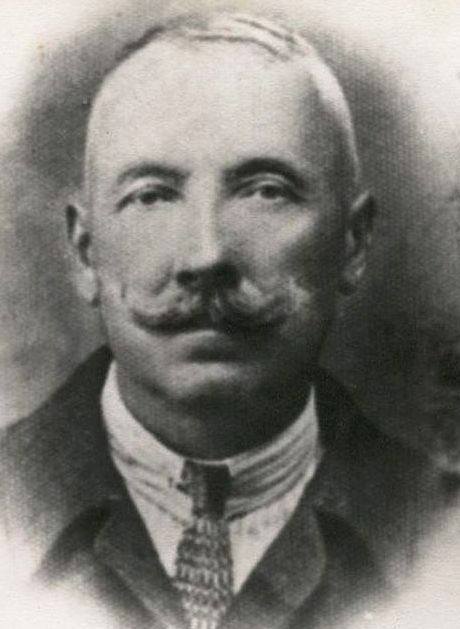
- Bolesław Pietraszek
- Died: 1 January 1965; Jabłonna Lacka
- Honours: Righteous Among the Nations

Alfreda and Bolesław Pietraszek (who both died on 1 January 1965 in Jabłonna Lacka) were a Polish husband and wife who sheltered several Jewish families consisting of 18 people during the Nazi German occupation of Poland in World War II. They were posthumously bestowed the titles of Righteous Among the Nations by Yad Vashem in September 2007. The medals and the diploma were presented by the Israeli vice-ambassador in Poland, Yossef Levy, to their two surviving cousins, Zofia Panfil and Jolanta Okulicz-Kozaryn from Olsztyn. In his speech, Yossef Levy said. "We have the utmost respect for those who risked their lives to save Jews under the threat of death. The rescued will never forget the rescuers."

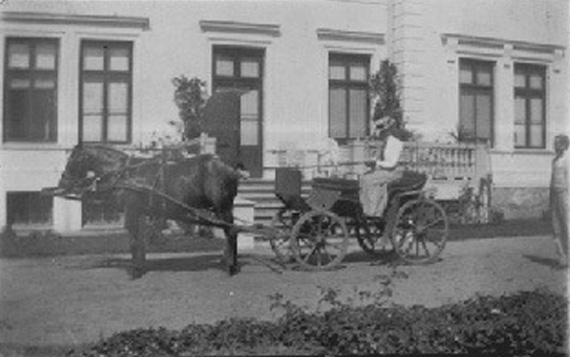
Old postcard from Ceranów, Masovian Voivodeship, Poland

Alfreda was a well-educated woman who spoke four languages, including German, which was very helpful during the war when she had to prevent the Nazi Germans from searching their property. Her husband was raised with a patriotic spirit; his father participated in the January Uprising at the age of 17, and his brother Marian died as a volunteer in the Polish-Soviet War. Their birthdates are unknown; it has only been established that they got married in 1920. According to the testimony of their relative, Jolanta Okulicz-Kozaryn, their decision to hide the Jews was a conscious one. During the war, Alfreda and Bolesław Pietraszek, a childless couple — both 60 years old — lived on a farm in Ceranów village (pictured) in Sokołów County in east-central Poland. For two years, around their farm, they harbored several Jewish families consisting of 18 people. The couple hid them in their barn, in their basements and in pig pens.

== Collective rescue ==
To feed the people they sheltered, Alfreda and Bolesław Pietraszek relied on the assistance of their neighbors and other inhabitants of the village. The rescuers and the rescued were never betrayed, and only one person did not survive — a child — smothered by his own mother with a pillow in order to stop the crying when the German patrol was in the house. "Even now, I can't quite believe this was a true story regardless of how well documented it is" — said Grażyna Panfil-Rogińska, daughter of Zofia Panfil, remembering the telephone call from the elated Bencion Sela from Israel — "he was so moved. Until today, over his own bed, he has a portrait of his savior. He sent it to me via email" — she said. Rogińska received a call also from Szaul Kopyto living in Washington, who confessed that he kept silent for years only because he needed to forget the experience.

The Jews, harbored by the Pietraszek couple between 1941 and 1943, managed to escape from the ghetto in nearby Sokołów Podlaski, home to a large population of Jews before the invasion. The ghetto was eventually liquidated by the Nazis, with all its inhabitants sent to the Treblinka extermination camp. Among those rescued was the whole family of Bencian Sela (his name also spelled as Ben Cjon Sela), including his grandparents. Sela's family, after the war, wanted to present the Pietraszeks with gold and other valuables, but the Poles refused saying that the Selas would need it more.

After the war, the Pietraszeks lost most of their 100-hectare farm to an Agrarian reform in the new communist Poland. The couple was eventually forced to leave the village after being subjected to over two dozen assaults and robberies. Local thieves, aware that the couple had sheltered Jews on their property, believed that there were Jewish valuables there, unaware that Pietraszeks refused any financial help from the rescued. Bolesław Pietraszek was injured by a hand grenade in one of the assaults. They both died in abject poverty in 1965.

The ceremony at which the Yad Vashem titles were granted to Alfreda and Bolesław Pietraszek took place during the inauguration of the Festival of the Jewish Culture in Olsztyn, popularized by Gazeta Wyborcza and other Polish media.
