= Church of St. Michael the Archangel, Nosów =

Orthodox church in Nosów, Poland

Church of St. Michael the Archangel
- Cerkiew św. Michała Archanioła
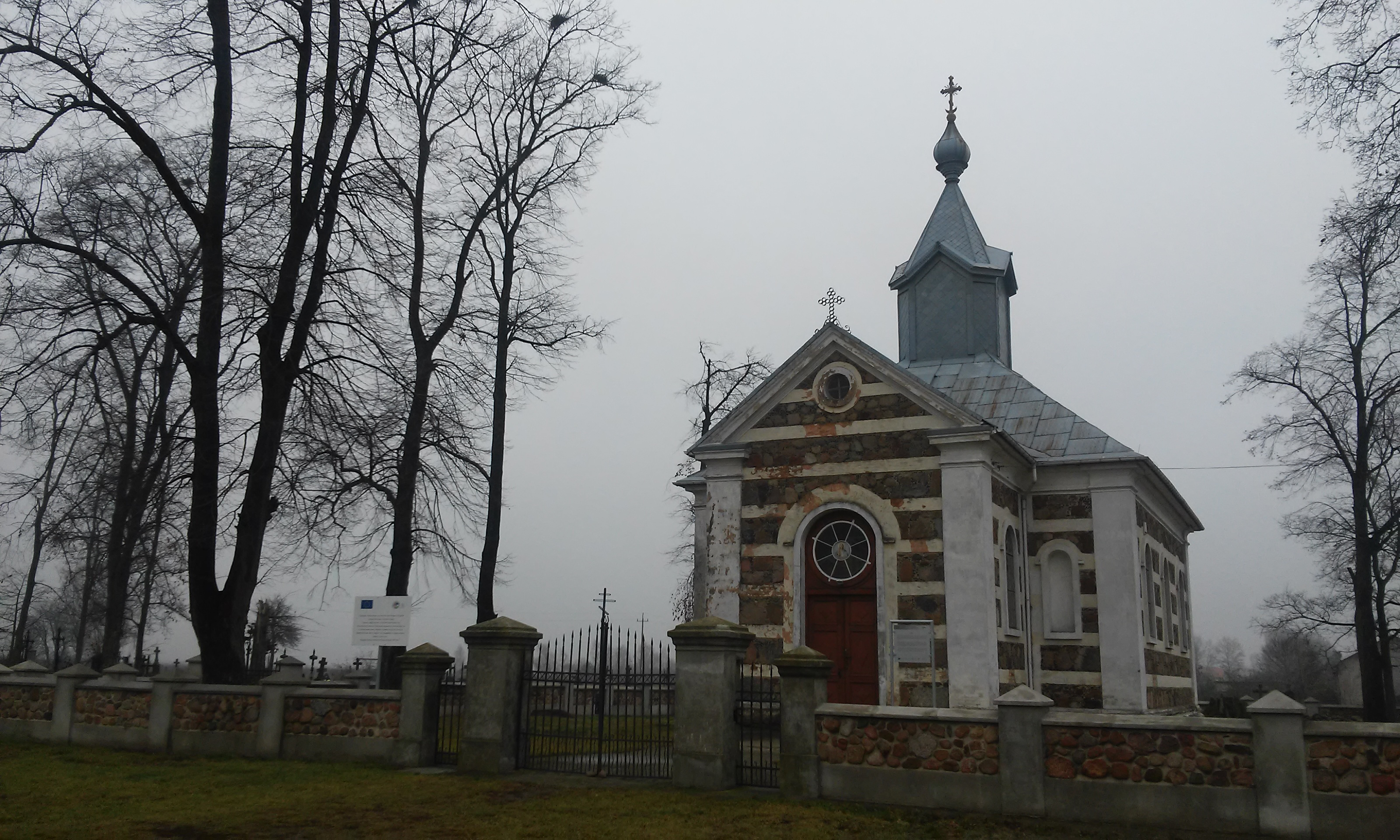
- Church of St. Michael the Archangel
- 52°09′41.8″N 23°00′43.0″E
- Location: Nosów
- Country: Poland
- Denomination: Eastern Orthodoxy
- Previous denomination: Greek Catholic
- Churchmanship: Polish Orthodox Church

History
- Status: active Orthodox church
- Founder: Józef Wężyk
- Dedication: Saint Michael the Archangel

Architecture
- Style: Neoclassical
- Completed: 1862

Specifications
- Materials: stone brick

Administration
- Diocese: Diocese of Lublin and Chełm

Church of St. Michael the Archangel is an Orthodox parish church in Nosów. It belongs to the Biała Podlaska Deanery of the Diocese of Lublin and Chełm of the Polish Orthodox Church.

The first Orthodox church in Nosów was established in the 16th century. After 1596, along with the entire Chełm Eparchy, it transitioned to the Uniate Church. Subsequent Uniate churches were built on the same site before 1609 and in 1774. The currently existing church was constructed in 1862 funded by the owner of the local estates, Józef Wężyk, and in 1875, it was handed over to the Orthodox parish. From that moment, the church has continuously served the Orthodox faithful. Between 1915 and 1919, when the local believers were evacuated to Russia, the church was inactive. In 1921, the local parish resumed its activities with the permission of the local authorities of the Second Polish Republic. Despite the deportations of the Ukrainian population to the Soviet Union and Operation Vistula, when most Orthodox parishes in the Lublin Land ceased to function due to the lack of faithful, the Nosów church continued its pastoral activities.

A special veneration in the church is given to the Leśna Icon of the Mother of God, a copy of which is located in the church's iconostasis.

The church is situated within an Orthodox cemetery, which has preserved historic gravestones from the second half of the 19th century and the early 20th century. The church grounds are enclosed by a wall, with a bell tower from 1870 located in one corner.

== History ==
The first information about the Orthodox church in Nosów dates back to 1585. According to another source, the church was established earlier, before 1542, funded by royal courtier Juchna Wańkiewicz. In 1596, after the Union of Brest, the entire Chełm Eparchy (to which the Nosów church belonged) transitioned to the Uniate Church, as Bishop Dionysius of Chełm signed the union act. After this, and before 1609, the Lacki family built a new Uniate church in Nosów. In 1753, the church in Nosów was described as ruined in a bishop's visitation protocol. Another building was constructed on the same site in 1774. Like the oldest Nosów church, this was a wooden structure. The church served as the parish seat of the Łosice Deanery of the Eparchy of Chełm–Belz.

In 1862, Józef Wężyk, the local landowner, funded the construction of the current building – the first brick church in the area. The construction date is engraved on a stone by the front door. In 1872, the church belonged to a parish with 1,072 members. The church reverted to the Orthodox parish following the Conversion of Chełm Eparchy in 1875. On 8 November 1881, after a renovation, it was re-consecrated by six clergymen led by Archimandrite Narcissus, the abbot of the St. Onuphrius Monastery in Jabłeczna. In 1888, Bishop Flavian of Lublin conducted a canonical visitation in Nosów. Another source mentions that the church renovation was completed in 1890. Nosów was one of the few villages in the northern part of southern Podlachia where, after the 1905 edict of toleration, the majority of residents remained Orthodox and did not convert to Catholicism.

In 1915, the clergy of the Nosów church and 50% of the parishioners were evacuated to Moscow and Kyiv. In 1919, the Polish Ministry of Religious Denominations and Public Enlightenment did not include the Nosów church on the list of proposed legal Orthodox pastoral sites in the Lublin Voivodeship. Nevertheless, by 1921, the church was the seat of a statutory parish, one of four in the Biała Deanery of the Diocese of Warsaw and Chełm. The parson in Nosów also served as the dean of Biała. The Nosów church was the only Orthodox church in the Konstantynów County operating in the interwar period. Other churches that functioned before 1915 became Neouniate churches.

From 1924 to 1944, the church was served by Father Andrzej Metiuk as both the parson and dean. He later became the head of the Ukrainian Orthodox Church of Canada.

The church in Nosów was closed following the deportations of the Ukrainian population to the Soviet Union and Operation Vistula. It was reactivated after some believers returned to Nosów and the surrounding areas. According to Grzegorz Pelica, this occurred as early as 1948. Jacek Wysocki states that the Nosów Orthodox parish never ceased its activity (at least nominally) and in 1947, directly after Operation Vistula, it continued to exist as one of four parishes in the Biała Deanery and ten in the entire Lublin Voivodeship. In 1953, the Nosów church was one of two (alongside the Church of the Transfiguration in Lublin) Orthodox churches in the Lublin Land where religious education for children was conducted. In 1969, about 100 parishioners attended the church. The following year, the parson sought assistance from the Church Fund to repair the church but was denied. Renovation of the church began only after the establishment of the Diocese of Lublin and Chełm in 1989. The building was thoroughly renovated in 1991.

Since 1993, the Nosów church has been a center of veneration for the Leśna Icon of the Mother of God, a devotion present among the local population since the late 17th century. The Diocese of Lublin and Chełm also aims to commemorate the traditions of the Monastery of the Nativity of the Mother of God, which existed in Leśna Podlaska from 1875 to 1914, and was closely associated with the Nosów parish in the 19th century. Annual celebrations in honor of the Leśna Icon of the Mother of God take place in Nosów on the first Sunday after the Feast of the Exaltation of the Holy Cross. Additionally, on September 2 each year, the church is the site of traditional prayers for the fallen and deceased aviators of the 6th Lviv Bomber Aviation Regiment, which was stationed in Nosów for a short time in September 1939. In 1997, a plaque commemorating the aviators was unveiled in the church.

== Architecture ==
=== Building structure ===
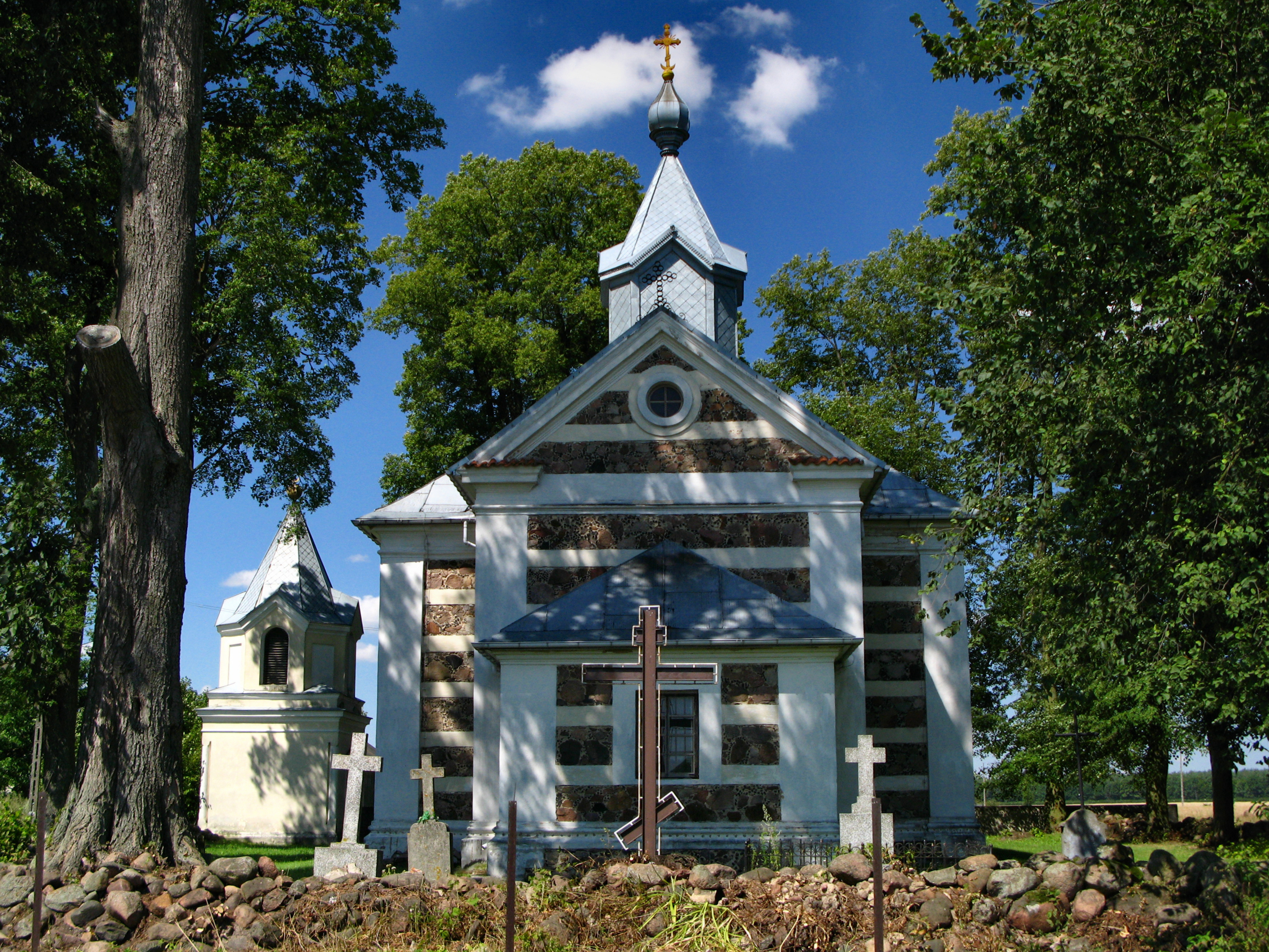
Church from the east side

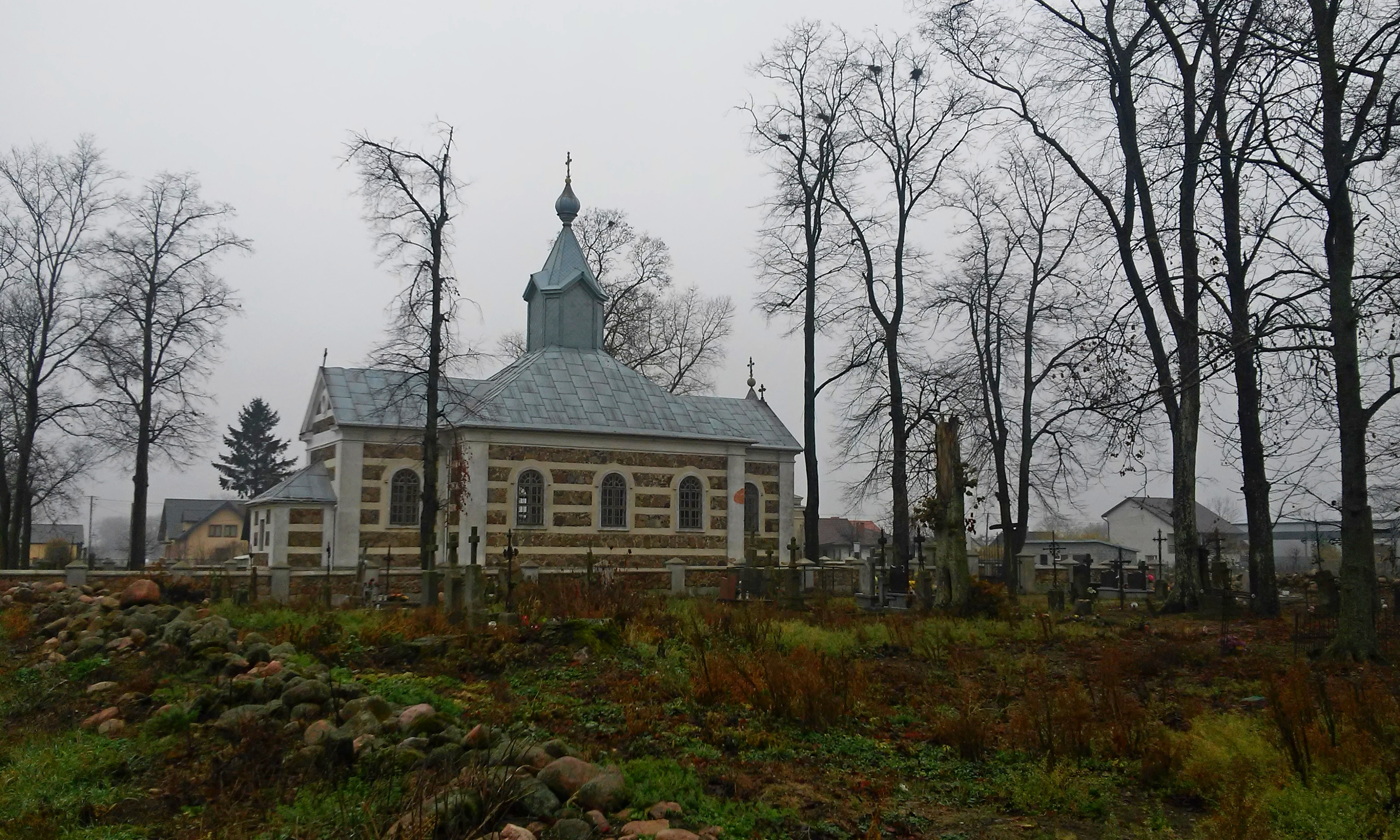
Church from the cemetery side

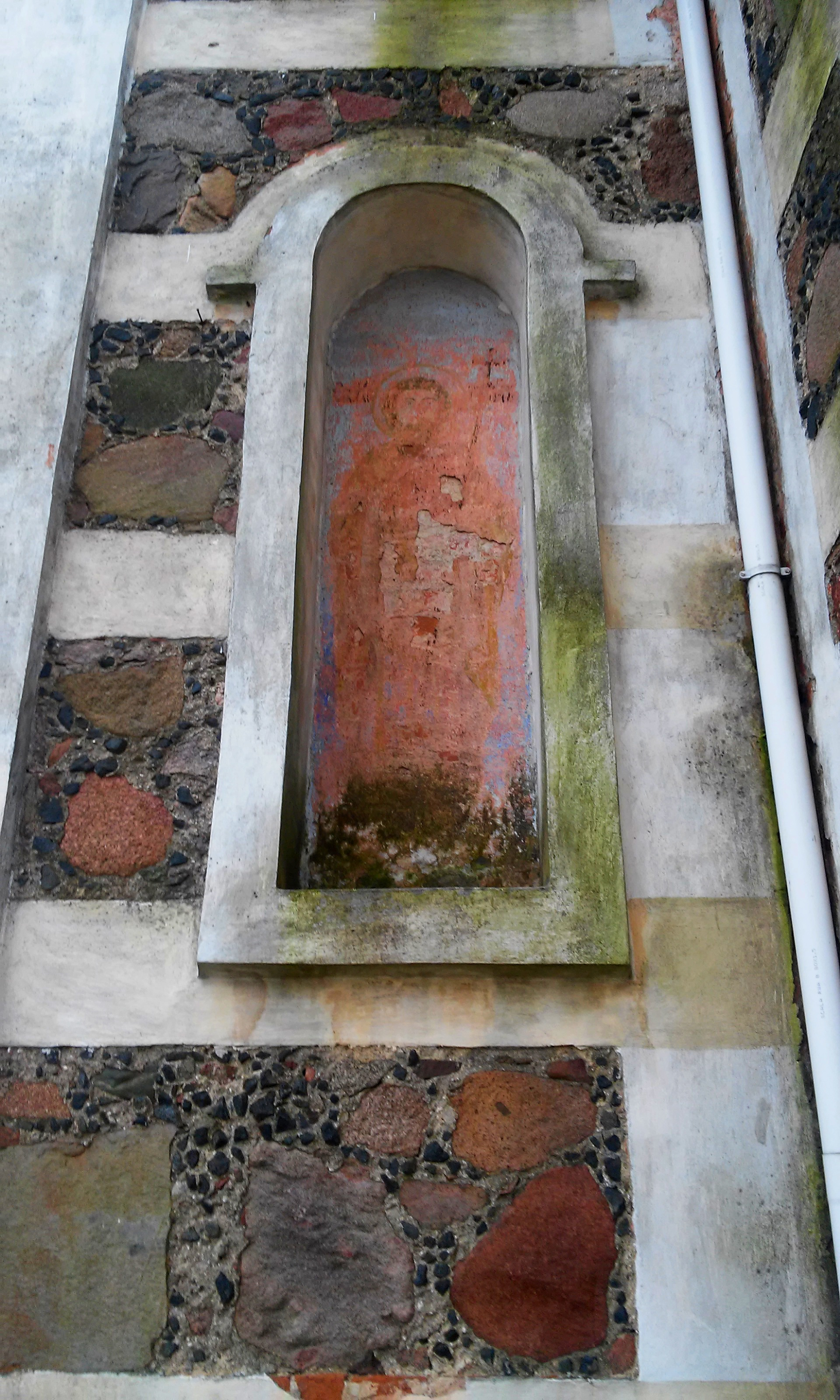
Destroyed fresco on the facade of the church

The church was built in 1862 in a Neoclassical style using stone and brick, with plastered detailing. In accordance with church architecture canons, it is oriented and tripartite. The church's single nave is rectangular in plan, while the chancel is square. The church porch is also rectangular. The facades are decorated with horizontal plaster bands. Tuscan pilasters are visible at the facade corners. The western facade is single-axial with a semicircular portal and a triangular gable featuring a round window. All windows in the building are semicircular and adorned with surrounds. The church has a gable roof over the nave, a hipped roof over the chancel, and a three-sided roof over the sacristy. An octagonal turret topped with a small onion-shaped dome is situated above the nave. The chancel is open with a semicircular arcade.

=== Interior ===
The interior features a wooden ceiling supported by four posts. It includes a single-row iconostasis with a high finish and triangular pediments above the royal doors and diaconal doors, dating from between 1870 and 1900. Above the royal doors of the iconostasis is a copy of the Leśna Icon of the Mother of God. The iconostasis contains images of John the Evangelist, Saint Nicholas, Saint Stephen, the Mother of God, Christ Pantocrator, Saint Lawrence, Archangel Michael, and the Annunciation. At the top of the iconostasis is a depiction of the Last Supper and symbols of the New and Old Testaments: a chalice and the Tablets of the Ten Commandments. The royal doors feature a cross with a small icon of the Annunciation at the center and figures of the Evangelists on the arms.

The side altar, dating from the 18th century when the church was still a Uniate parish, contains an icon of the Mother of God (type Hodegetria) framed between Corinthian columns, topped with an Eye of Providence depiction. The side icon cases hold 19th-century icons of Vladimir the Great and the Mother of God. Additional icons outside the icon cases include smaller icons of the Three Holy Hierarchs from the late 18th century, and 19th-century images of the Baptism of Christ, Pantocrator (two icons), St. Onuphrius, Deesis, the Mother of God (two icons), the Nativity of Christ, Our Lady of Kazan, the Intercession of the Theotokos, Mark the Evangelist, Saints Chrysanthus and Daria and Theodore, St. Alexius, Metropolitan of Kiev, Christ the Teacher, Saints Peter and Paul the Apostle. From the destroyed church in Konstantynów, the church in Nosów acquired an icon case with an icon of Archangel Michael and an icon of St. Gabriel.

The church also contains a Holy Sepulcher with an Epitaphios from the late 19th century and a Golgotha from around 1870. There are also two 19th-century paintings featuring the Virgin Mary with Child and Archangel Michael and Saint Pantaleon, as well as processional banners depicting the Resurrected Christ and St. Nicholas (two identical banners), the Ascension and Job of Pochayev, the Acheiropoieta and the Nativity, Saint Pantaleon, and the Holy Family. The church's liturgical utensils include a 19th-century ciborium and a vessel from the same period for blessing bread, oil, and wine, as well as five candlesticks from the same century.

=== Bell tower ===
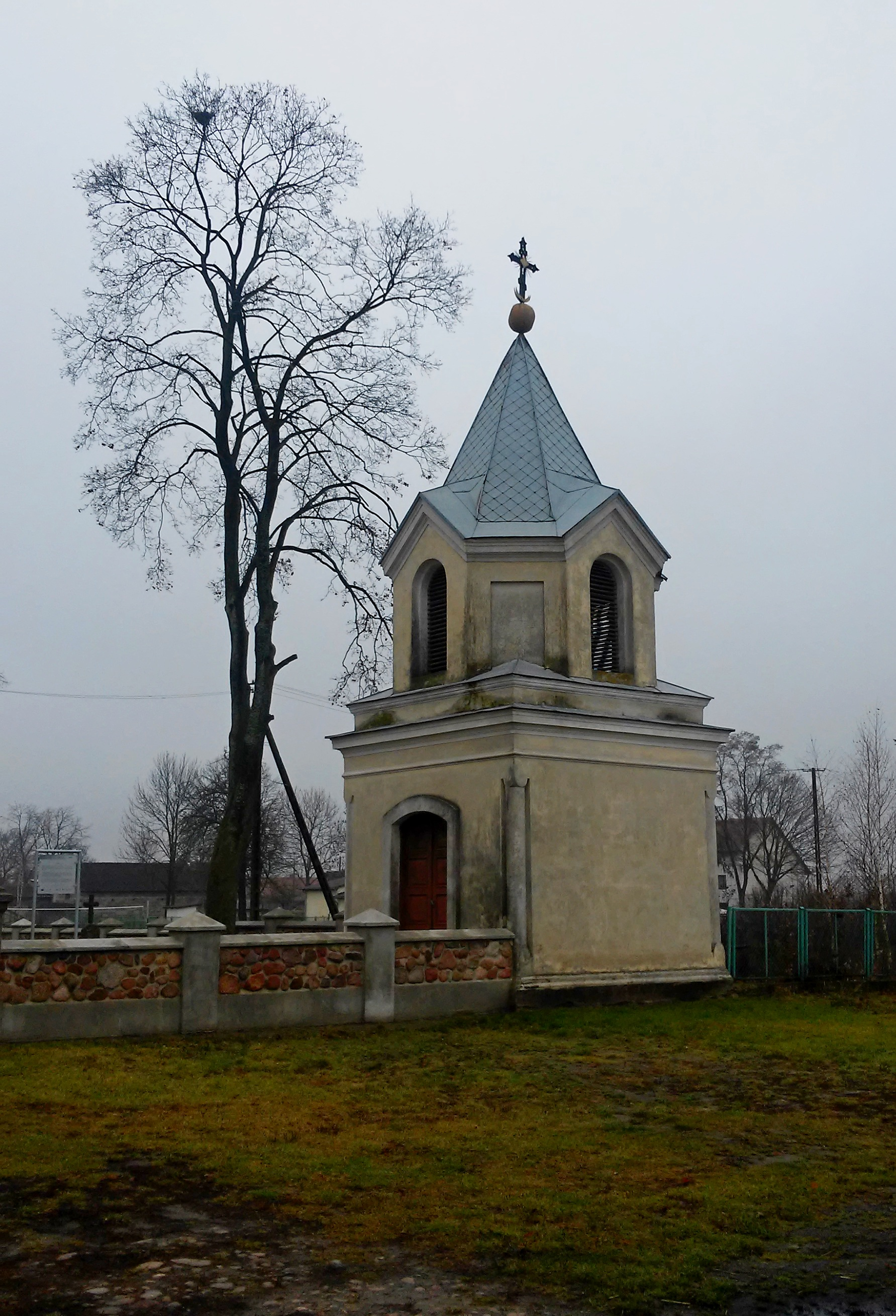
Bell tower

The bell tower of the church in Nosów is a free-standing structure located in the southwestern corner of the church cemetery. It is a two-story building made of brick, plastered, and square in plan. Tuscan columns are visible at the building's corners. The upper story is octagonal in plan with four semicircular open arcades.

In 1997, a cross was erected near the church to commemorate Operation Vistula.

The church, bell tower, and the surrounding fence were registered as heritage monuments on 31 December 1983 under number A-144.

== Bibliography ==
- Wysocki, Jacek (2011). Ukraińcy na Lubelszczyźnie w latach 1944–1956 (in Polish). Lublin: Instytut Pamięci Narodowej. ISBN 978-83-7629-260-1.
