= Gmina Leśna Podlaska =

Gmina Leśna Podlaska Leśna Podlaska Commune
- Gmina
- Coat of arms
- Interactive map of Gmina Leśna Podlaska
- Coordinates (Leśna Podlaska): 52°8′4″N 23°1′34″E
- Country: Poland
- Voivodeship: Lublin
- County: Biała County
- Seat: Leśna Podlaska

Area
  - Total: 97.69 km^{2} (37.72 sq mi)

Population (2014)
  - Total: 4,334
  - Density: 44.36/km^{2} (114.9/sq mi)
- Website: http://www.lesnapodlaska.pl

Gmina Leśna Podlaska is a rural gmina (administrative district) in Biała County, Lublin Voivodeship, in eastern Poland. Its seat is the village of Leśna Podlaska, which lies approximately 13 kilometres (8 mi) north-west of Biała Podlaska and 104 km (65 mi) north of the regional capital Lublin.

The gmina covers an area of 97.69 square kilometres (37.7 sq mi), and as of 2006 its total population is 4,494 (4,334 in 2014).

== Villages ==
Gmina Leśna Podlaska contains the villages and settlements of Bukowice, Bukowice-Kolonia, Droblin, Jagodnica, Klukowszczyzna, Leśna Podlaska, Ludwinów, Mariampol, Nosów, Nosów-Kolonia, Nowa Bordziłówka, Ossówka, Ossówka-Kolonia, Stara Bordziłówka, Witulin, Witulin-Kolonia, Worgule and Zaberbecze.

== Neighbouring gminas ==
Gmina Leśna Podlaska is bordered by the gminas of Biała Podlaska, Huszlew, Janów Podlaski, Konstantynów and Stara Kornica.
