= Ossówka, Lublin Voivodeship =

Ossówka
- Village
- Location within Poland
- Coordinates: 52°7′7″N 23°8′10″E
- Country: Poland
- Voivodeship: Lublin
- County: Biała
- Gmina: Leśna Podlaska

Population (approx.)
  - Total: 500

Ossówka [ɔˈsːufka] is a village in the administrative district of Gmina Leśna Podlaska, within Biała County, Lublin Voivodeship, in eastern Poland.
