= Gródek, Sokołów County =

Gródek
- Village
- Location within Poland
- Coordinates: 52°29′33″N 22°30′42″E
- Country: Poland
- Voivodeship: Masovian
- County: Sokołów
- Gmina: Jabłonna Lacka

Gródek [ˈɡrudɛk] is a village in the administrative district of Gmina Jabłonna Lacka, within Sokołów County, Masovian Voivodeship, in east-central Poland.
