= Jagodnica =

- Village
- Location within Poland
- Coordinates: 52°6′N 23°4′E
- Country: Poland
- Voivodeship: Lublin
- County: Biała
- Gmina: Leśna Podlaska

Population
  - Total: 109

Jagodnica [jaɡɔdˈɲit͡sa] is a village in the administrative district of Gmina Leśna Podlaska, within Biała County, Lublin Voivodeship, in eastern Poland.
