= Łuzki, Sokołów County =

Łuzki
- Village
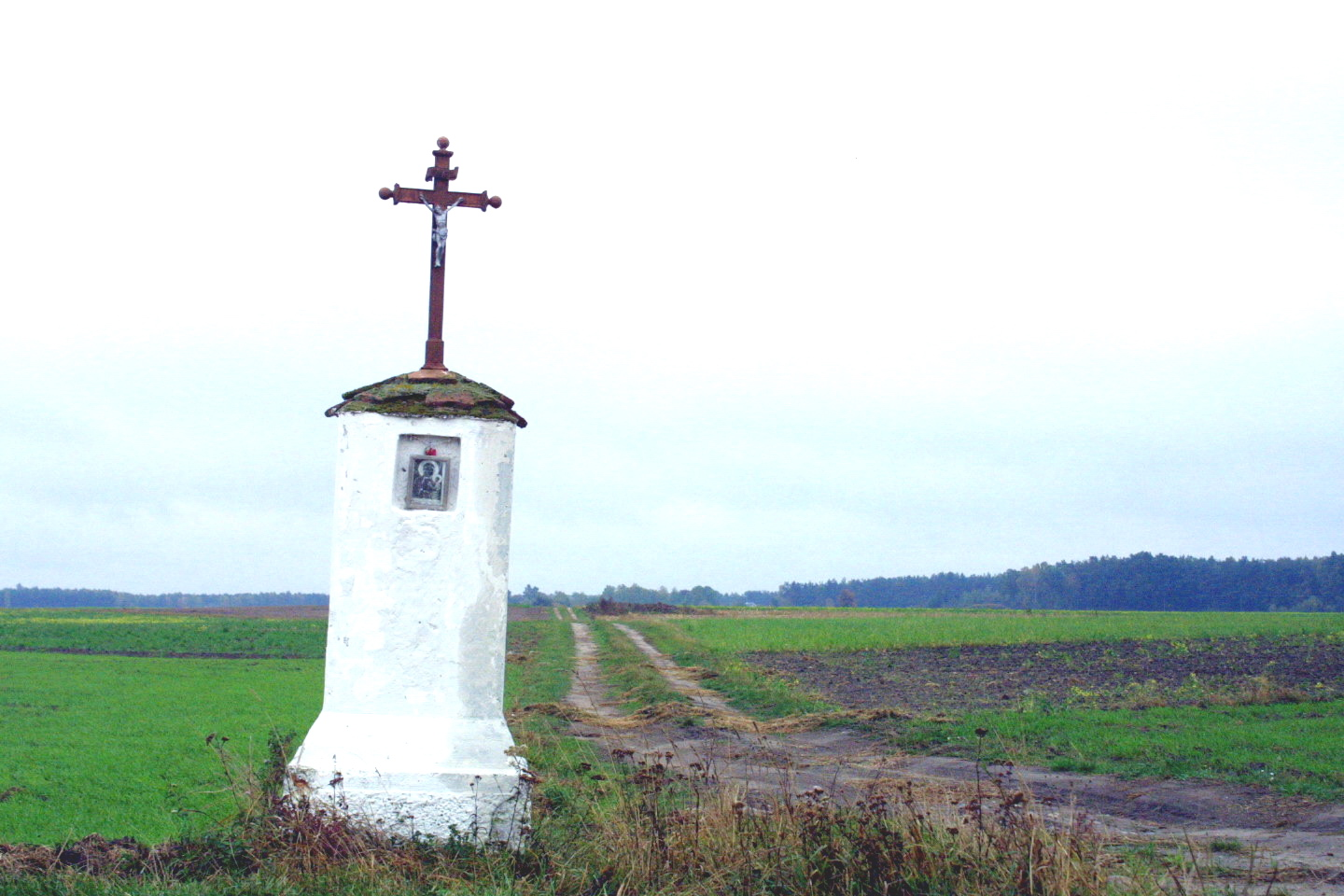

- Location within Poland
- Coordinates: 52°26′40″N 22°26′46″E
- Country: Poland
- Voivodeship: Masovian
- County: Sokołów
- Gmina: Jabłonna Lacka

Łuzki [ˈwuski] is a village in the administrative district of Gmina Jabłonna Lacka, within Sokołów County, Masovian Voivodeship, in east-central Poland.
