= Bukowice =

Bukowice may refer to:

- Bukowice, Milicz County in Lower Silesian Voivodeship (south-west Poland)
- Bukowice, Wołów County in Lower Silesian Voivodeship (south-west Poland)
- Bukowice, Lublin Voivodeship (east Poland)
