= Gródek-Dwór =

- Village
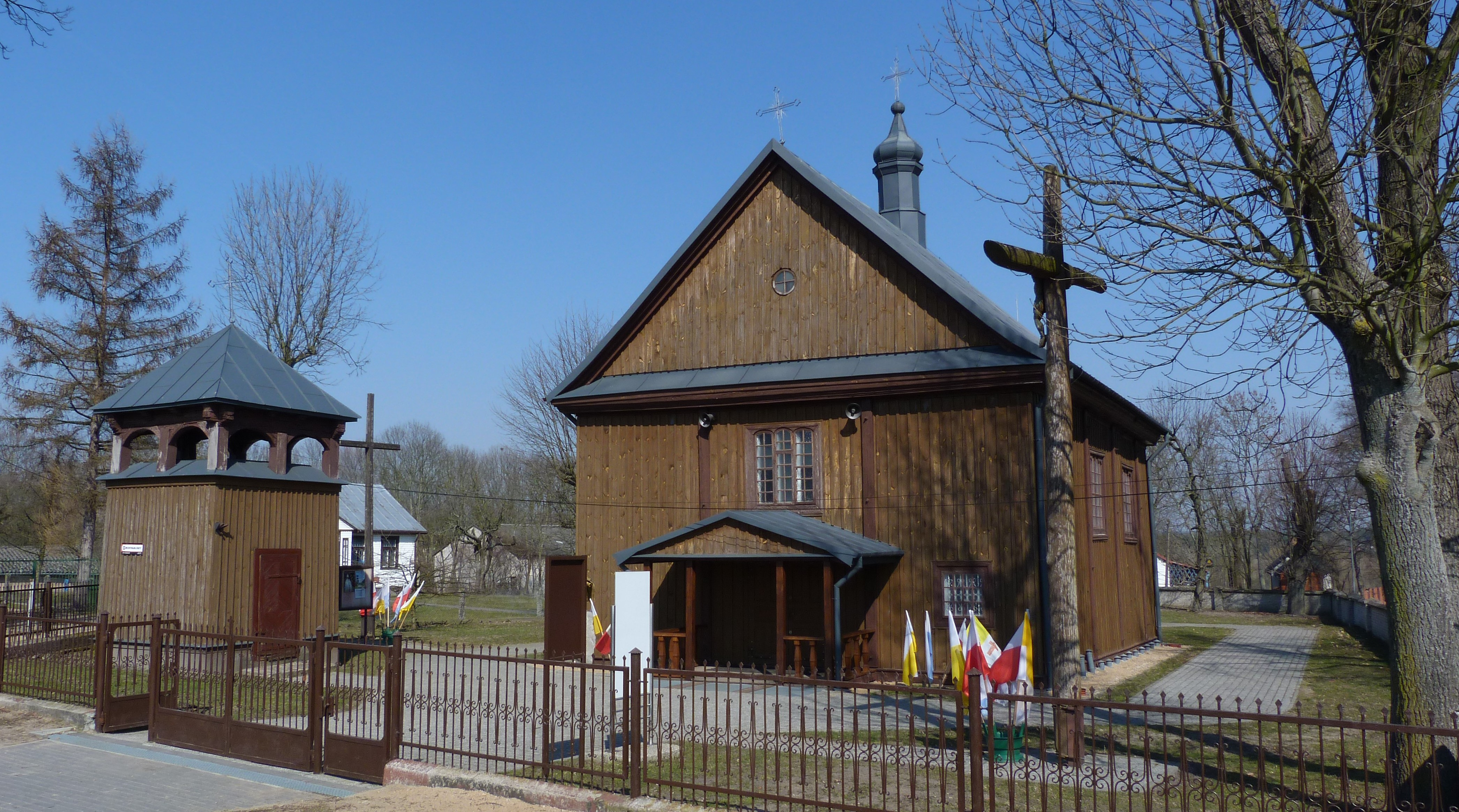

- Location within Poland
- Coordinates: 52°28′16″N 22°29′45″E
- Country: Poland
- Voivodeship: Masovian
- County: Sokołów
- Gmina: Jabłonna Lacka

Gródek-Dwór [ˈɡrudɛk ˈdvur] is a village in the administrative district of Gmina Jabłonna Lacka, within Sokołów County, Masovian Voivodeship, in east-central Poland.
