= Ludwinów, Gmina Leśna Podlaska =

Ludwinów
- Village
- Location within Poland
- Coordinates: 52°7′1″N 23°1′12″E
- Country: Poland
- Voivodeship: Lublin
- County: Biała
- Gmina: Leśna Podlaska

Ludwinów [ludˈvʲinuf] is a village in the administrative district of Gmina Leśna Podlaska, within Biała County, Lublin Voivodeship, in eastern Poland.
