= Gmina Jabłonna Lacka =

Gmina Jabłonna Lacka Jabłonna Lacka Commune
- Gmina
- Interactive map of Gmina Jabłonna Lacka
- Coordinates (Jabłonna Lacka): 52°28′39″N 22°26′34″E
- Country: Poland
- Voivodeship: Masovian
- County: Sokołów
- Seat: Jabłonna Lacka

Area
  - Total: 149.4 km^{2} (57.7 sq mi)

Population (2013)
  - Total: 4,766
  - Density: 31.90/km^{2} (82.62/sq mi)

Gmina Jabłonna Lacka is a rural gmina (administrative district) in Sokołów County, Masovian Voivodeship, in east-central Poland. Its seat is the village of Jabłonna Lacka, which lies approximately 16 kilometres (10 mi) north-east of Sokołów Podlaski and 103 km (64 mi) east of Warsaw.

The gmina covers an area of 149.4 square kilometres (57.7 sq mi), and as of 2006 its total population is 5,059 (4,766 in 2013).

== Villages ==
Gmina Jabłonna Lacka contains the villages and settlements of Bujały-Gniewosze, Bujały-Mikosze, Czekanów, Dzierzby Szlacheckie, Dzierzby Włościańskie, Gródek, Gródek-Dwór, Jabłonna Lacka, Jabłonna Średnia, Jabłonna-Kolonia, Krzemień-Wieś, Krzemień-Zagacie, Łuzki, Łuzki-Kolonia, Mołożew-Wieś, Morszków, Niemirki, Nowomodna, Stara Jabłonna, Teofilówka, Toczyski Podborne, Toczyski Średnie, Tończa, Wierzbice-Guzy, Wierzbice-Strupki, Wieska-Wieś and Wirów.

== Neighbouring gminas ==
Gmina Jabłonna Lacka is bordered by the gminas of Ciechanowiec, Drohiczyn, Perlejewo, Repki, Sabnie, Sokołów Podlaski and Sterdyń.
