= Krzemień-Wieś =

Village in Gmina Jabłonna Lacka, Poland

- Village
- Location within Poland
- Coordinates: 52°32′29″N 22°29′13″E
- Country: Poland
- Voivodeship: Masovian
- County: Sokołów
- Gmina: Jabłonna Lacka

Krzemień-Wieś [ˈkʂɛmjɛɲ ˈvjɛɕ] is a village in the administrative district of Gmina Jabłonna Lacka, within Sokołów County, Masovian Voivodeship, in east-central Poland.
