= Wirów, Masovian Voivodeship =

Wirów
- Village
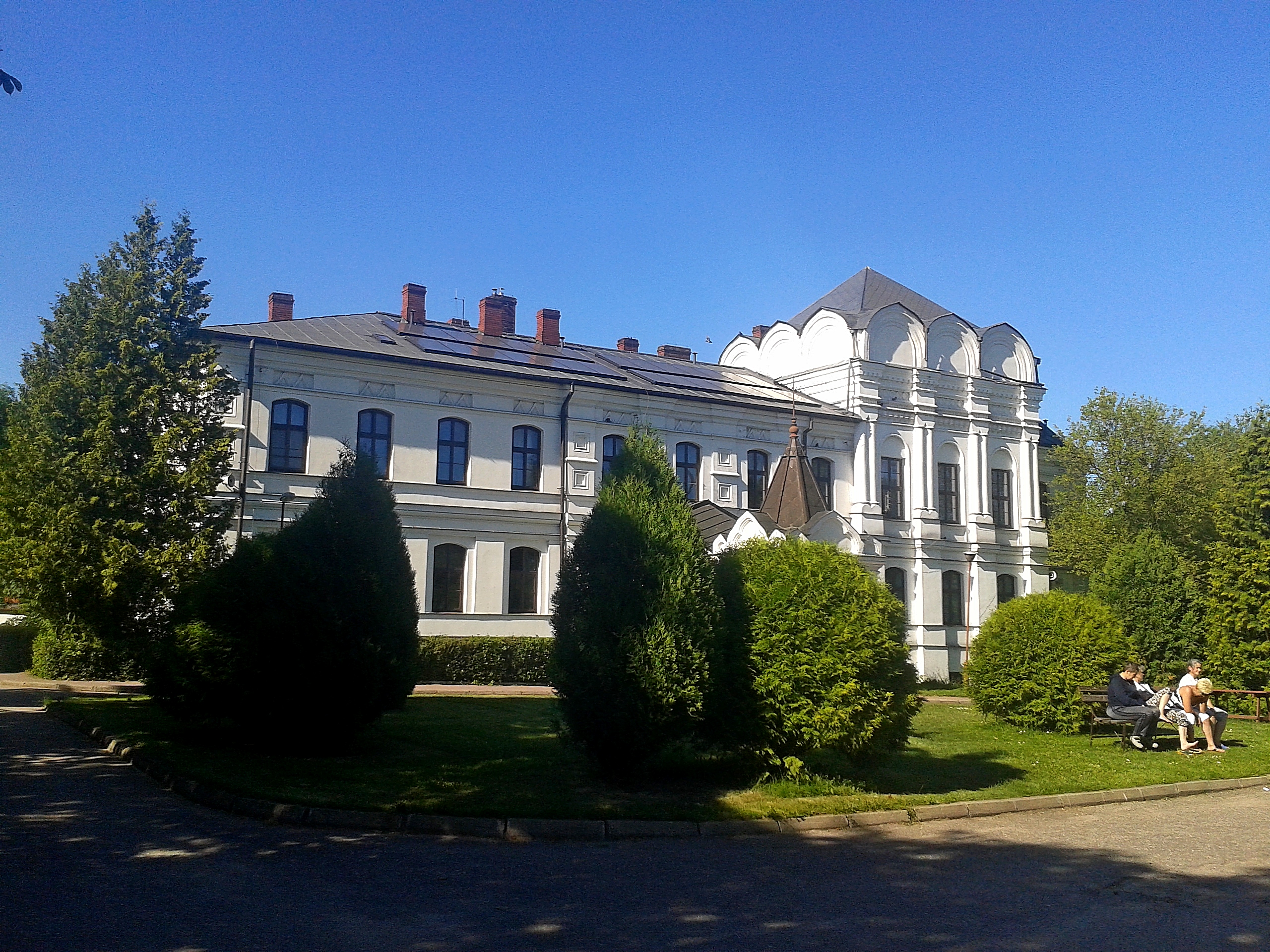
- Former Orthodox Monastery of Christ the Savior

- Location within Poland
- Coordinates: 52°26′N 22°30′E
- Country: Poland
- Voivodeship: Masovian
- County: Sokołów
- Gmina: Jabłonna Lacka

Wirów [ˈviruf] is a village in the administrative district of Gmina Jabłonna Lacka, within Sokołów County, Masovian Voivodeship, in east-central Poland.
