= Łuzki-Kolonia =

Village in Gmina Jabłonna Lacka, Poland

- Village
- Location within Poland
- Coordinates: 52°27′01″N 22°26′16″E
- Country: Poland
- Voivodeship: Masovian
- County: Sokołów
- Gmina: Jabłonna Lacka
- Population: 101

Łuzki-Kolonia [ˈwuski kɔˈlɔɲa] is a village in the administrative district of Gmina Jabłonna Lacka, within Sokołów County, Masovian Voivodeship, in east-central Poland.
