= Witulin-Kolonia =

- Village
- Location within Poland
- Coordinates: 52°07′22″N 23°04′20″E
- Country: Poland
- Voivodeship: Lublin
- County: Biała
- Gmina: Leśna Podlaska

Witulin-Kolonia [vʲiˈtulʲin kɔˈlɔɲa] is a village in the administrative district of Gmina Leśna Podlaska, within Biała County, Lublin Voivodeship, in eastern Poland.
