= Droblin, Lublin Voivodeship =

Droblin
- Village
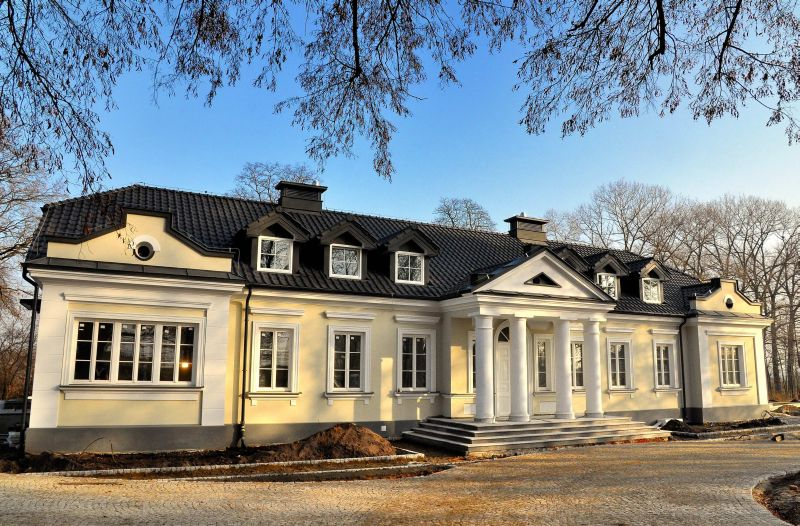

- Location within Poland
- Coordinates: 52°8′N 22°58′E
- Country: Poland
- Voivodeship: Lublin
- County: Biała
- Gmina: Leśna Podlaska
- Time zone: UTC+1 (CET)
  - Summer (DST): UTC+2 (CEST)

Droblin [ˈdrɔblʲin] is a village in the administrative district of Gmina Leśna Podlaska, within Biała County, Lublin Voivodeship, in eastern Poland.

== History ==
15 Polish citizens were murdered by Nazi Germany in the village during World War II.
