= Niemirki =

- Village
- Location within Poland
- Coordinates: 52°28′N 22°28′E
- Country: Poland
- Voivodeship: Masovian
- County: Sokołów
- Gmina: Jabłonna Lacka

Niemirki [ɲɛˈmirki] is a village in the administrative district of Gmina Jabłonna Lacka, within Sokołów County, Masovian Voivodeship, in east-central Poland.

The locale's designation derives from the Slavic given name Niemir.
