= Nowa Bordziłówka =

- Village
- Location within Poland
- Coordinates: 52°07′28″N 23°01′11″E
- Country: Poland
- Voivodeship: Lublin
- County: Biała
- Gmina: Leśna Podlaska

Nowa Bordziłówka [ˈnɔva bɔrd͡ʑiˈwufka] is a village in the administrative district of Gmina Leśna Podlaska, within Biała County, Lublin Voivodeship, in eastern Poland.
