= Bujały-Mikosze =

Village in Gmina Jabłonna Lacka, Poland

- Village
- Location within Poland
- Coordinates: 52°27′35″N 22°22′25″E
- Country: Poland
- Voivodeship: Masovian
- County: Sokołów
- Gmina: Jabłonna Lacka

Bujały-Mikosze [buˈjawɨ miˈkɔʂɛ] is a village in the administrative district of Gmina Jabłonna Lacka, within Sokołów County, Masovian Voivodeship, in east-central Poland.
