= Guzy (surname) =

Guzy is a surname. Notable people with the surname include:

- Carol Guzy (born 1956), American photographer
- Jarosław Guzy (born 1955), Polish politician and businessman
- Michaela Guzy, American media executive, entrepreneur, and on-air show host
- Stefan Guzy (born 1980), German poster artist, typographer and manuscript researcher
