= Nosów, Lublin Voivodeship =

Nosów
- Village
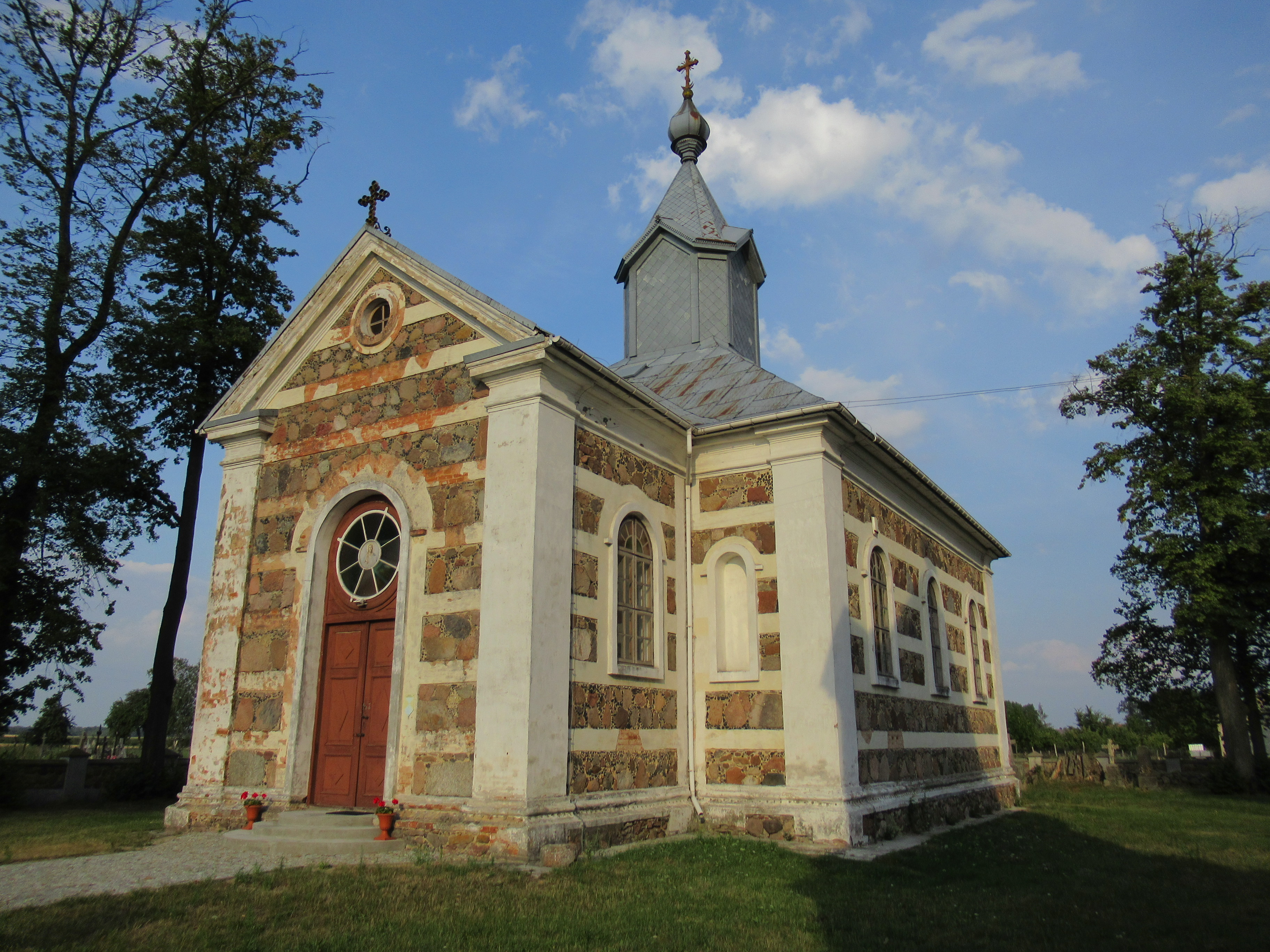
- Church of St. Michael the Archangel, Nosów

- Location within Poland
- Coordinates: 52°9′43″N 23°0′40″E
- Country: Poland
- Voivodeship: Lublin
- County: Biała
- Gmina: Leśna Podlaska
- Time zone: UTC+1 (CET)
  - Summer (DST): UTC+2 (CEST)

Nosów [ˈnɔsuf] is a village in the administrative district of Gmina Leśna Podlaska, within Biała County, Lublin Voivodeship, in eastern Poland.

== History ==
Four Polish citizens were murdered by Nazi Germany in the village during World War II.
