= Krzemień-Zagacie =

- Village
- Location within Poland
- Coordinates: 52°31′12″N 22°30′15″E
- Country: Poland
- Voivodeship: Masovian
- County: Sokołów
- Gmina: Jabłonna Lacka

Krzemień-Zagacie [ˈkʂɛmjɛɲ zaˈɡat͡ɕɛ] is a village in the administrative district of Gmina Jabłonna Lacka, in Sokołów County, Masovian Voivodeship, in east-central Poland.
