= Dzierzby Szlacheckie =

- Village
- Location within Poland
- Coordinates: 52°31′28″N 22°25′38″E
- Country: Poland
- Voivodeship: Masovian
- County: Sokołów
- Gmina: Jabłonna Lacka
- Population: 240

Dzierzby Szlacheckie [ˈd͡ʑɛʐbɨ ʂlaˈxɛt͡skʲɛ] is a village in the administrative district of Gmina Jabłonna Lacka, within Sokołów County, Masovian Voivodeship, in east-central Poland.
