= Jabłonna-Kolonia =

Village in Gmina Jabłonna Lacka, Poland

- Village
- Location within Poland
- Coordinates: 52°29′45″N 22°27′20″E
- Country: Poland
- Voivodeship: Masovian
- County: Sokołów
- Gmina: Jabłonna Lacka
- Population: 102

Jabłonna-Kolonia [jaˈbwɔnna kɔˈlɔɲa] is a village in the administrative district of Gmina Jabłonna Lacka, within Sokołów County, Masovian Voivodeship, in east-central Poland.
