= Bujały-Gniewosze =

Village in Gmina Jabłonna Lacka, Poland

- Village
- Location within Poland
- Coordinates: 52°27′36″N 22°21′26″E
- Country: Poland
- Voivodeship: Masovian
- County: Sokołów
- Gmina: Jabłonna Lacka

Bujały-Gniewosze [buˈjawɨ ɡɲɛˈvɔʂɛ] is a village in the administrative district of Gmina Jabłonna Lacka, within Sokołów County, Masovian Voivodeship, in east-central Poland.
