= Ossówka-Kolonia =

- Village
- Location within Poland
- Coordinates: 52°07′34″N 23°07′17″E
- Country: Poland
- Voivodeship: Lublin
- County: Biała
- Gmina: Leśna Podlaska

Ossówka-Kolonia [ɔˈsːufka kɔˈlɔɲa] is a village in the administrative district of Gmina Leśna Podlaska, within Biała County, Lublin Voivodeship, in eastern Poland.
