= Klukowszczyzna =

- Village
- Location within Poland
- Coordinates: 52°08′59″N 22°58′32″E
- Country: Poland
- Voivodeship: Lublin
- County: Biała
- Gmina: Leśna Podlaska

Klukowszczyzna [klukɔfʂˈt͡ʂɨzna] is a village in the administrative district of Gmina Leśna Podlaska, within Biała County, Lublin Voivodeship, in eastern Poland.
