= Zaberbecze =

- Village
- Location within Poland
- Coordinates: 52°6′N 23°2′E
- Country: Poland
- Voivodeship: Lublin
- County: Biała
- Gmina: Leśna Podlaska

Zaberbecze [zabɛrˈbɛt͡ʂɛ] is a village in the administrative district of Gmina Leśna Podlaska, within Biała County, Lublin Voivodeship, in eastern Poland.
