= Wierzbice-Strupki =

- Village
- Location within Poland
- Coordinates: 52°25′23″N 22°22′15″E
- Country: Poland
- Voivodeship: Masovian
- County: Sokołów
- Gmina: Jabłonna Lacka

Wierzbice-Strupki [vjɛʐˈbit͡sɛ ˈstrupki] is a village in the administrative district of Gmina Jabłonna Lacka, within Sokołów County, Masovian Voivodeship, in east-central Poland.
