= Dzierzby Włościańskie =

- Village
- Location within Poland
- Coordinates: 52°31′34″N 22°25′55″E
- Country: Poland
- Voivodeship: Masovian
- County: Sokołów
- Gmina: Jabłonna Lacka

Dzierzby Włościańskie (Polish pronunciation: [ˈdʑɛʐbɨ vwɔɕˈtɕaj̃skʲɛ]) is a village in the administrative district of Gmina Jabłonna Lacka, within Sokołów County, Masovian Voivodeship, in east-central Poland.
