= Stara Bordziłówka =

- Village
- Location within Poland
- Coordinates: 52°8′49″N 22°58′40″E
- Country: Poland
- Voivodeship: Lublin
- County: Biała
- Gmina: Leśna Podlaska

Stara Bordziłówka [ˈstara bɔrd͡ʑiˈwufka] is a village in the administrative district of Gmina Leśna Podlaska, within Biała County, Lublin Voivodeship, in eastern Poland.
