= Tończa, Sokołów County =

Tończa
- Village
- Location within Poland
- Coordinates: 52°30′N 22°24′E
- Country: Poland
- Voivodeship: Masovian
- County: Węgrów
- Gmina: Liw

Tończa [ˈtɔɲt͡ʂa] is a village in the administrative district of Gmina Jabłonna Lacka, within Sokołów County, Masovian Voivodeship, in east-central Poland.
