= Bukovice (Brno-Country District) =

- Municipality
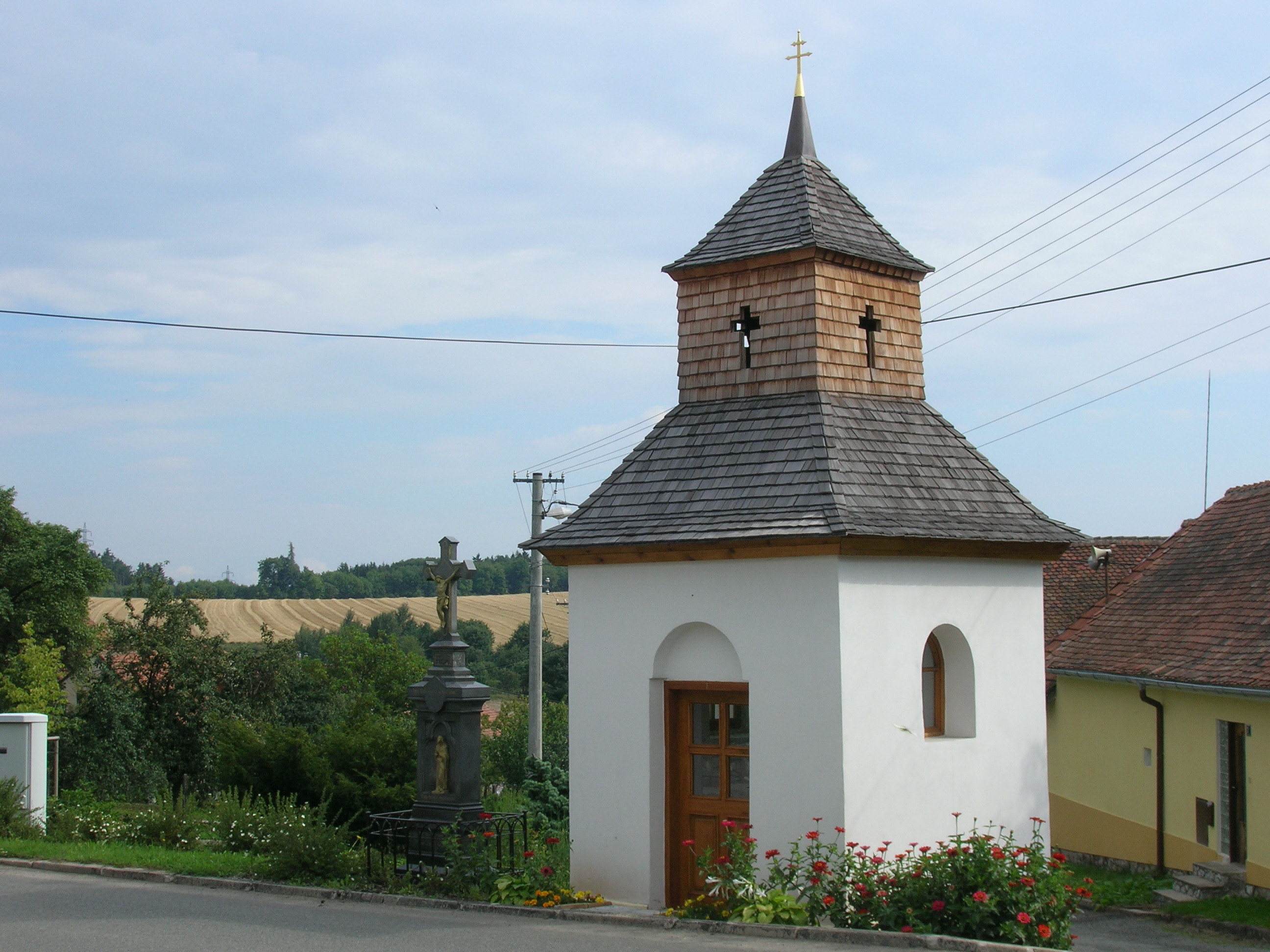
- Chapel in Bukovice

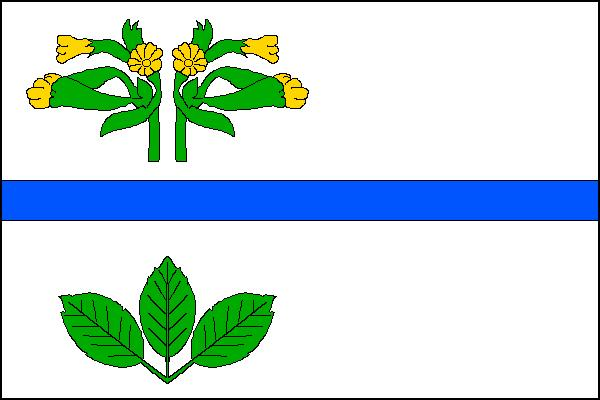
- Flag Coat of arms

- Location in the Czech Republic
- Coordinates: 49°24′24″N 16°29′23″E
- Country: Czech Republic
- Region: South Moravian
- District: Brno-Country
- First mentioned: 1255

Area
  - Total: 3.18 km^{2} (1.23 sq mi)
- Elevation: 474 m (1,555 ft)

Population (2026-01-01)
  - Total: 99
  - Density: 31/km^{2} (81/sq mi)
- Time zone: UTC+1 (CET)
  - Summer (DST): UTC+2 (CEST)
- Postal code: 679 23
- Website: www.bukovice.cz

Bukovice is a municipality and village in Brno-Country District in the South Moravian Region of the Czech Republic. It has about 100 inhabitants.

Bukovice lies approximately 25 kilometres (16 mi) north of Brno and 167 km (104 mi) south-east of Prague.

== Demographics ==
Historical population
Year	Pop.	±%
1869	165	—
1880	167	+1.2%
1890	187	+12.0%
1900	172	−8.0%
1910	144	−16.3%
1921	159	+10.4%
1930	140	−11.9%
1950	122	−12.9%
1961	114	−6.6%
1970	96	−15.8%
1980	86	−10.4%
1991	73	−15.1%
2001	57	−21.9%
2011	59	+3.5%
2021	89	+50.8%
Source: Censuses
