= Michaela Guzy =

American travel blogger and TV personality

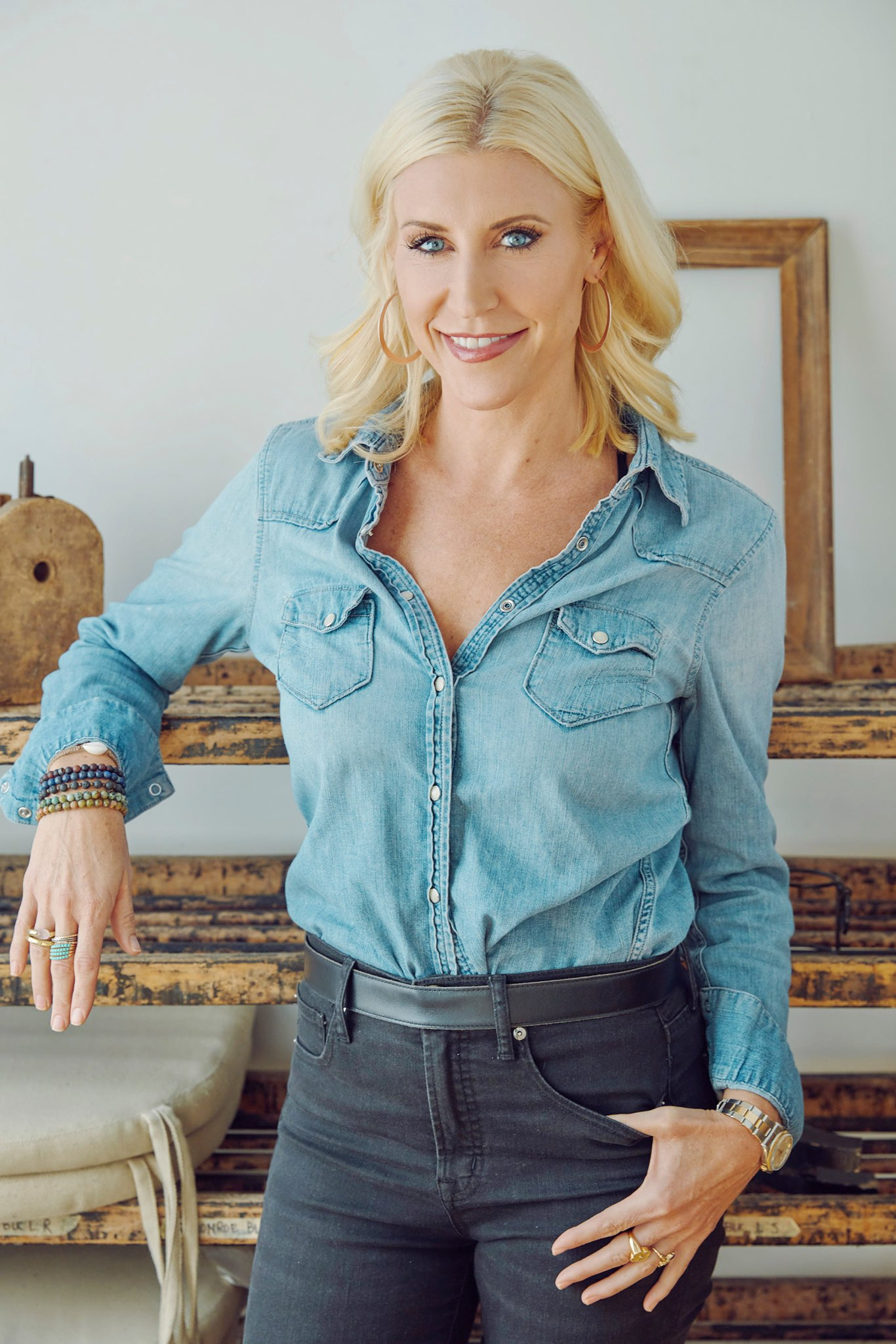
- Born: New York, New York, U.S.
- Occupations: Documentary filmmaker, travel journalist

Michaela Guzy is an American documentary filmmaker, travel journalist, American media executive, producer, and on-air show host.

She is the founder of the editorial content house, OhThePeopleYouMeet which she founded in 2012 after departing her corporate job as the VP/Global Travel and Strategic Development for American Express Publishing.

== Early life ==
Guzy was born in Missouri where she was raised before graduating from Spring Hill College and moving to New York City.

== Work ==
In her award-winning series, “OH THE PEOPLE YOU MEET with Michaela Guzy”, she meets local people you could meet when traveling, including chefs, designers, artists, activists and scientists. Her show has appeared on American Airlines In Flight, KTLA+ and Thrive Global. Seasons 1, 2 + 3 are currently in flight on Qatar Airways, and Modern Luxury Media's streaming service M/LUX.

In response to COVID-19 she launched a visual podcast called InspirationStation. There are currently over 125 episodes which has gained over 10 million views. In 2020, Guzy documented the world reopening safely in a video postcard series, SLEEPING AROUND SAFELY. As of May 2024, the series has over 105 episodes. The series was also nominated for its first award at International Tourism Film Festival Africa in June 2024.

Guzy is an advocate for sustainable living. She speaks at industry travel events and conferences, such as Michaela has World Travel Market (WTM) and International Luxury Travel Market (ILTM); and TBEX .

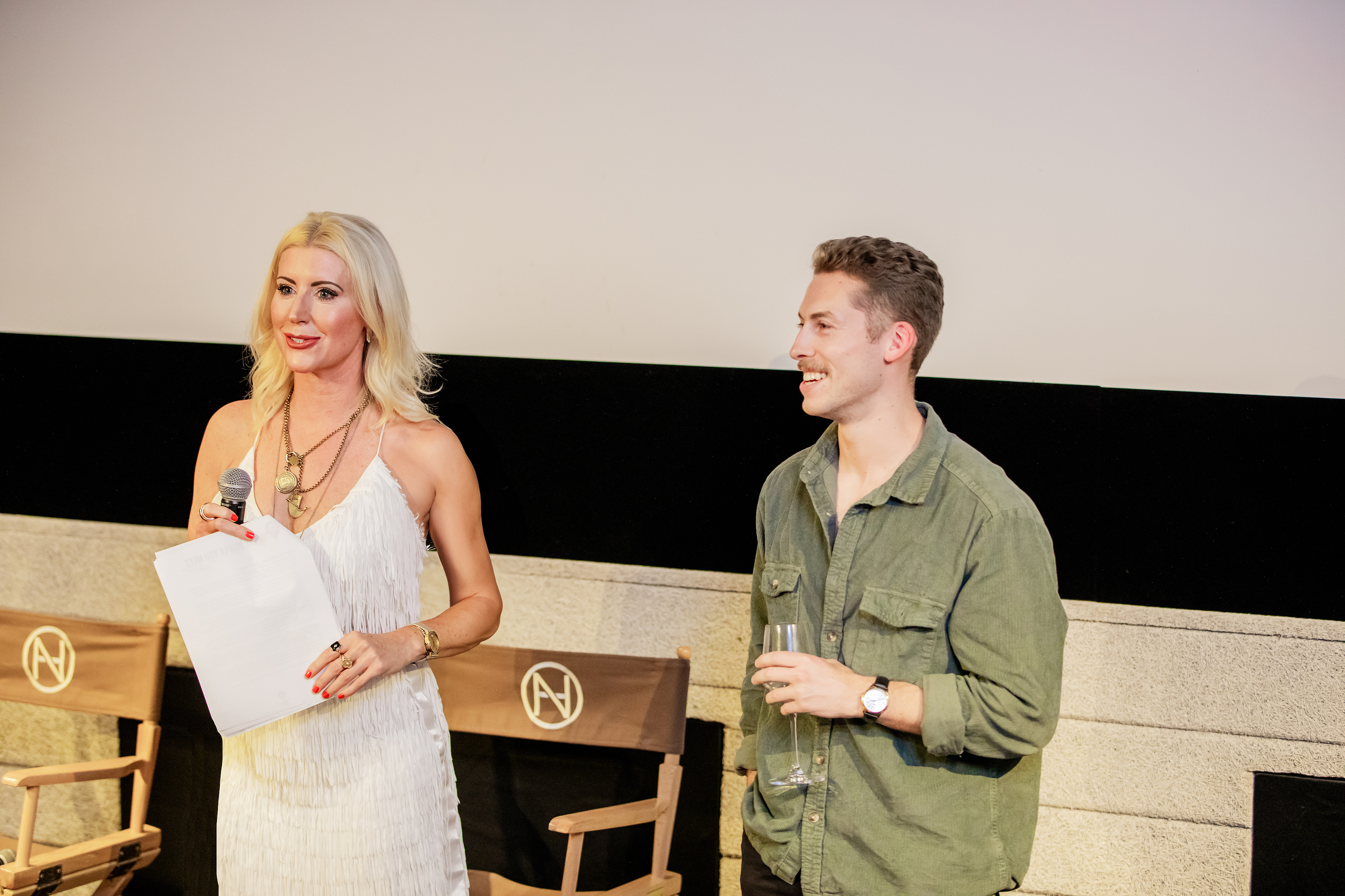
Michaela talking at an event.

She appears as a sustainable travel, human connection and wellbeing expert on morning shows including CBS New York, Channel News Asia (CNA), ChekTV Vancouver and KLTA.

Her travels have been included in media outlets, such as Highways Magazine, Forbes, Thrive Global and Bravo TV.

Guzy was an adjunct professor at New York University School of Professional Studies from 2017-2020, where she created and taught a course called, "Travel Storytelling: Creating Video Content".

== Awards ==
Year	Award	Subject	Result	Ref
	Goldman Sachs + Babson's 10,000 Small Businesses – Most Promising – New York, USA	Self		
	Hospitality Sales & Marketing International (Best in Show and Best in Show for PR) – New York, USA	Self		
	International Tourism Film Festival Africa, Cape Town – Director's Choice Award	Self	Won	
2019	Wildlife Conservation Film Festival	Self	Nominated	
2023	ITFFA/International Tourism Film Festival Africa – Best in Show	Self	Won	
2023	ITFFA/International Tourism Film Festival Africa – Silver in Sustainability	Self	Won	
2024	Silver Doc, TV and Web – ITFFA/International Tourism Film Festival Africa 2024	SLEEPING AROUND SAFELY with Istra, Croatia	Won	
2024	Silver Doc, TV and Web – ITFFA/International Tourism Film Festival Africa 2024	OH THE PEOPLE YOU MEET with Michaela Guzy	Won	
2024	Gold Doc, TV and Web – ITFFA/International Tourism Film Festival Africa 2024	OH THE PEOPLE YOU MEET with Michaela Guzy	Won	
