= Bukowice, Lublin Voivodeship =

Bukowice
- Village
- Location within Poland
- Coordinates: 52°9′7″N 23°0′0″E
- Country: Poland
- Voivodeship: Lublin
- County: Biała
- Gmina: Leśna Podlaska

Bukowice [bukɔˈvʲit͡sɛ] is a village in the administrative district of Gmina Leśna Podlaska, within Biała County, Lublin Voivodeship, in eastern Poland.
