= Wierzbice-Guzy =

- Village
- Location within Poland
- Coordinates: 52°26′N 22°22′E
- Country: Poland
- Voivodeship: Masovian
- County: Sokołów
- Gmina: Jabłonna Lacka

Wierzbice-Guzy [vjɛʐˈbit͡sɛ ˈɡuzɨ] is a village in the administrative district of Gmina Jabłonna Lacka, within Sokołów County, Masovian Voivodeship, in east-central Poland.
