= Mołożew-Wieś =

- Village
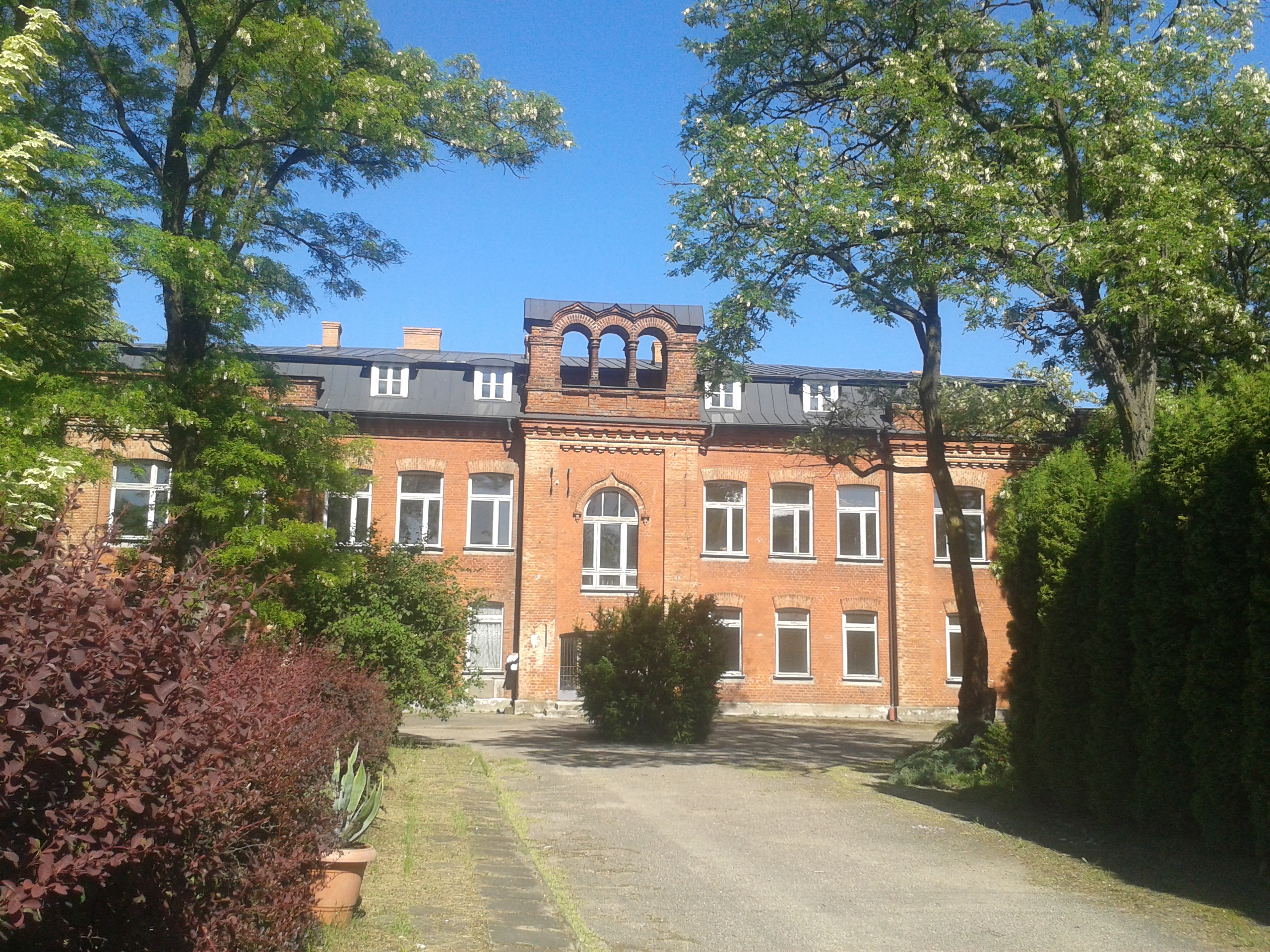

- Location within Poland
- Coordinates: 52°27′26″N 22°31′33″E
- Country: Poland
- Voivodeship: Masovian
- County: Sokołów
- Gmina: Jabłonna Lacka

Mołożew-Wieś [mɔˈwɔʐɛf ˈvjɛɕ] is a village in the administrative district of Gmina Jabłonna Lacka, within Sokołów County, Masovian Voivodeship, in east-central Poland.
