= Bukovice (Náchod District) =

- Municipality
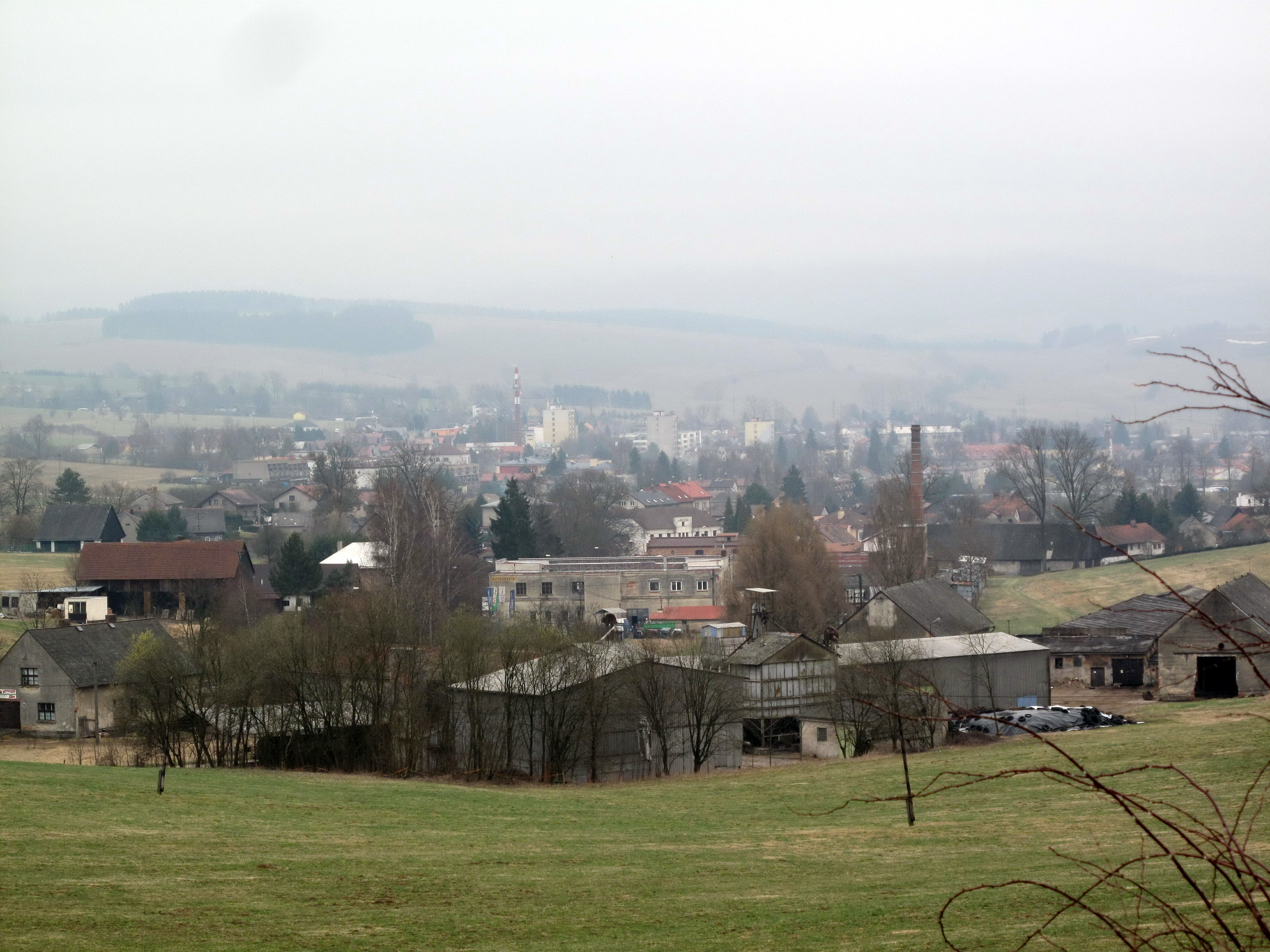
- View from the northwest

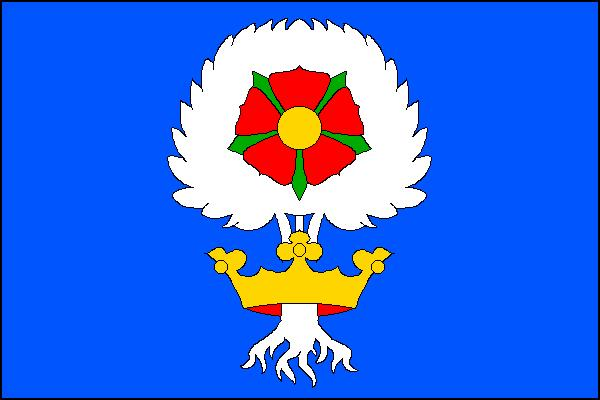
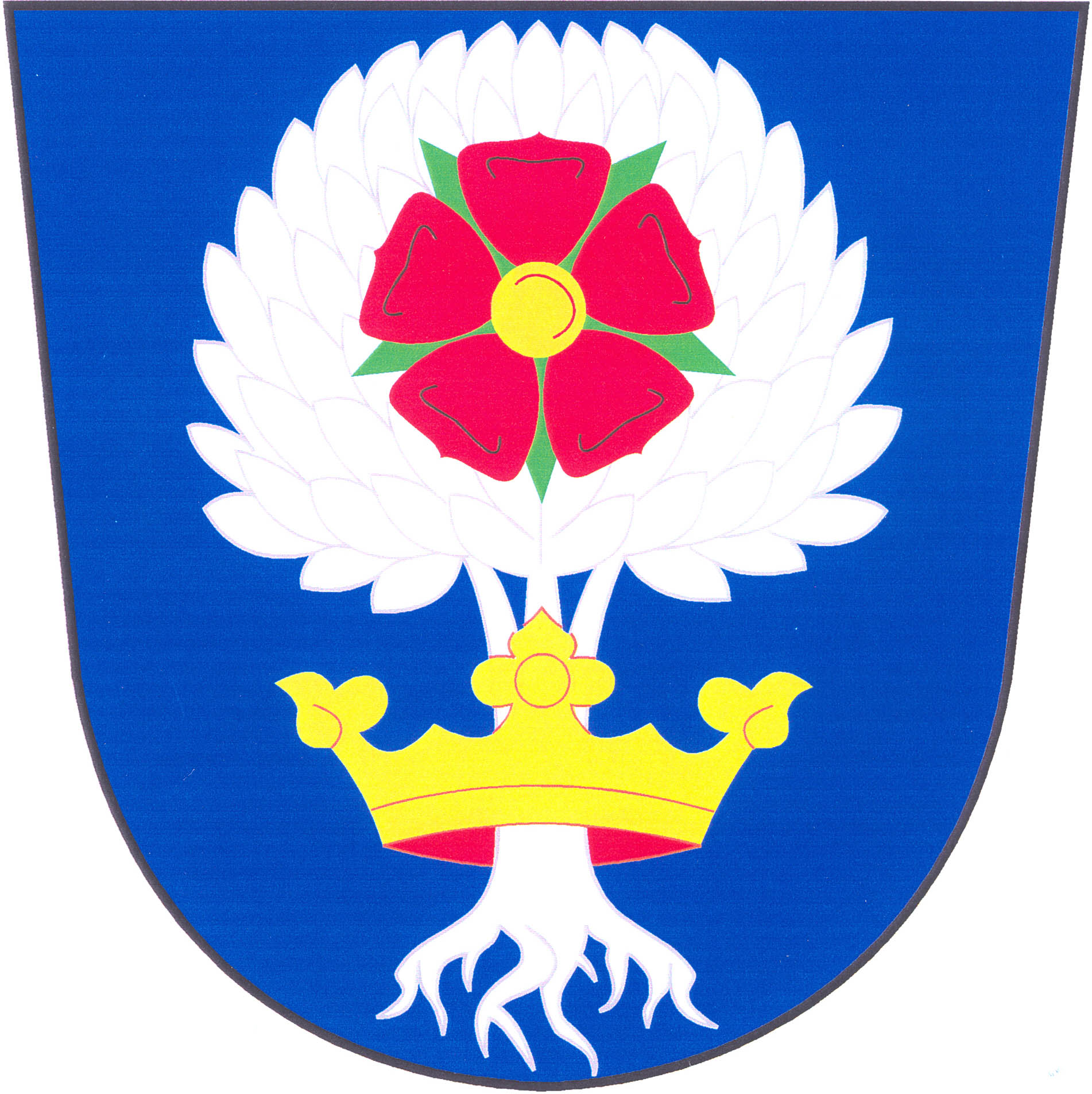
- Flag Coat of arms

- Location in the Czech Republic
- Coordinates: 50°32′58″N 16°13′41″E
- Country: Czech Republic
- Region: Hradec Králové
- District: Náchod
- First mentioned: 1406

Area
  - Total: 2.43 km^{2} (0.94 sq mi)
- Elevation: 453 m (1,486 ft)

Population (2026-01-01)
  - Total: 375
  - Density: 154/km^{2} (400/sq mi)
- Time zone: UTC+1 (CET)
  - Summer (DST): UTC+2 (CEST)
- Postal code: 549 54
- Website: www.obecbukovice.cz

Bukovice is a municipality and village in Náchod District in the Hradec Králové Region of the Czech Republic. It has about 400 inhabitants.

== Etymology ==
The name of the village is derived from the adjective buková, meaning 'beech' (mountain, hillside, stream, etc.). The stream in the village was probably also previously called Bukovice.

== Geography ==
Bukovice is located about 15 kilometres (9 mi) north of Náchod and 24 km (15 mi) south of the Polish city of Wałbrzych. It lies in the Broumov Highlands, in the Broumovsko Protected Landscape Area. The highest point is a hill at 583 m (1,913 ft) above sea level. The streams Hlavňovský potok and Pěkovský potok merge in the centre of the village. From the confluence, the stream is known as Dunajka.

== History ==
The first written mention of Bukovice is from 1406. In 1421, the village was burned down by the Silesian army. In 1535, the village was hit by a plague epidemic. Another disaster was the Thirty Years' War, during which the village was devastated. In 1727, Bukovice had 17 inhabitants.

== Demographics ==
Historical population

Year	Pop.	±%
1869	326	—
1880	334	+2.5%
1890	293	−12.3%
1900	318	+8.5%
1910	348	+9.4%

Year	Pop.	±%
1921	342	−1.7%
1930	437	+27.8%
1950	383	−12.4%
1961	377	−1.6%
1970	394	+4.5%

Year	Pop.	±%
1980	403	+2.3%
1991	433	+7.4%
2001	380	−12.2%
2011	362	−4.7%
2021	340	−6.1%

Source: Censuses

== Transport ==
There are no railways or major roads passing through the municipality.

== Sights ==
Among the protected cultural monuments is a column with a statue of the Virgin Mary from 1747 and a rural house from the mid-19th century that is an example of regional folk architecture.
