= Toczyski Podborne =

- Village
- Location within Poland
- Coordinates: 52°31′N 22°26′E
- Country: Poland
- Voivodeship: Masovian
- County: Sokołów
- Gmina: Jabłonna Lacka

Toczyski Podborne [tɔˈt͡ʂɨski pɔdˈbɔrnɛ] is a village in the administrative district of Gmina Jabłonna Lacka, within Sokołów County, Masovian Voivodeship, in east-central Poland.
