= Leśna Podlaska =

- Village
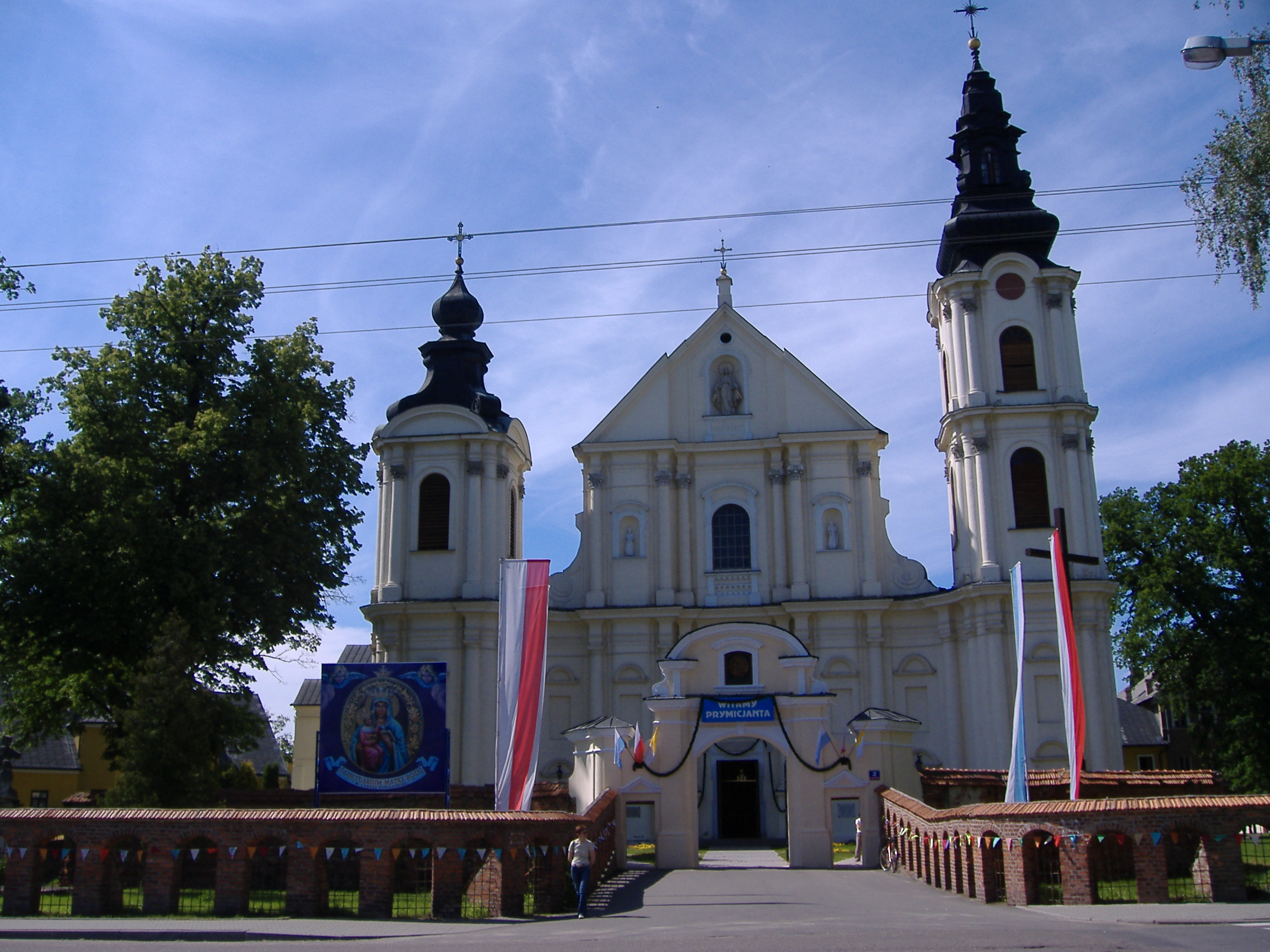

- Coat of arms

- Location within Poland
- Coordinates: 52°8′4″N 23°1′34″E
- Country: Poland
- Voivodeship: Lublin
- County: Biała
- Gmina: Leśna Podlaska

Population
  - Total: 900

Leśna Podlaska [ˈlɛɕna pɔdˈlaska] is a village in Biała County, Lublin Voivodeship, in eastern Poland. It is the seat of the gmina (administrative district) called Gmina Leśna Podlaska.
