= Jabłonna Lacka =

- Village
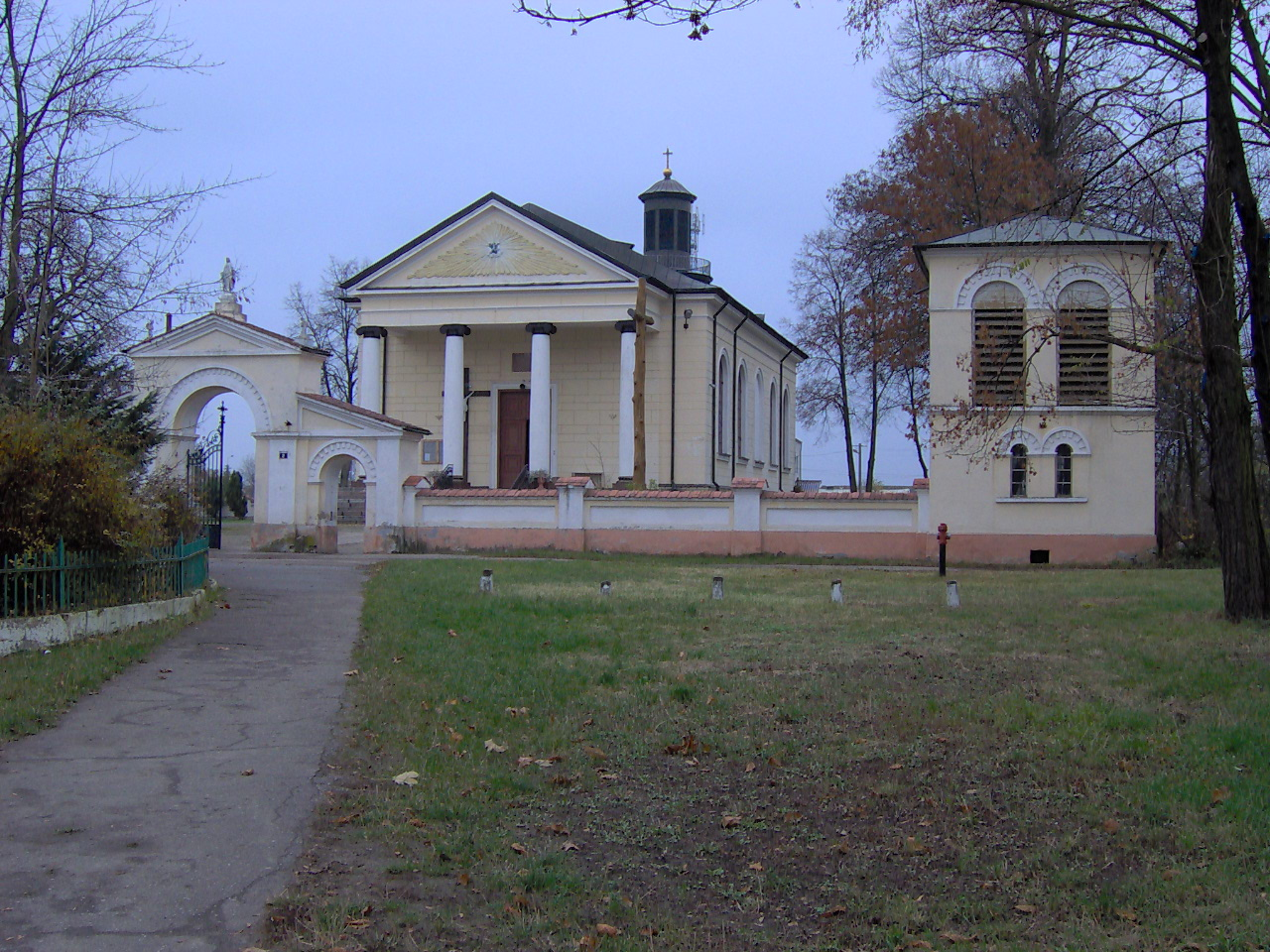

- Location within Poland
- Coordinates: 52°28′39″N 22°26′34″E
- Country: Poland
- Voivodeship: Masovian
- County: Sokołów
- Gmina: Jabłonna Lacka
- Population (approx.): 1,500

Jabłonna Lacka [jaˈbwɔnna ˈlat͡ska] is a village in Sokołów County, Masovian Voivodeship, in east-central Poland. It is the seat of the gmina (administrative district) called Gmina Jabłonna Lacka.
