= Skibniew =

Skibniew may refer to villages in Sokołów County, Masovian Voivodeship, east-central Poland:

- Skibniew-Kurcze
- Skibniew-Podawce

== See also ==
- Skibniewski
