= Bachorza =

Bachorza may refer to the following places:

- Bachorza, Kuyavian-Pomeranian Voivodeship (central Poland)
- Bachorza, Łosice County in Masovian Voivodeship (east-central Poland)
- Bachorza, Sokołów County in Masovian Voivodeship (east-central Poland)
  - Bachorza manor, a neo-classical manor house
- Bachorza, Warmian-Masurian Voivodeship (north Poland)
