= Maria Koc =

Polish politician (born 1964)

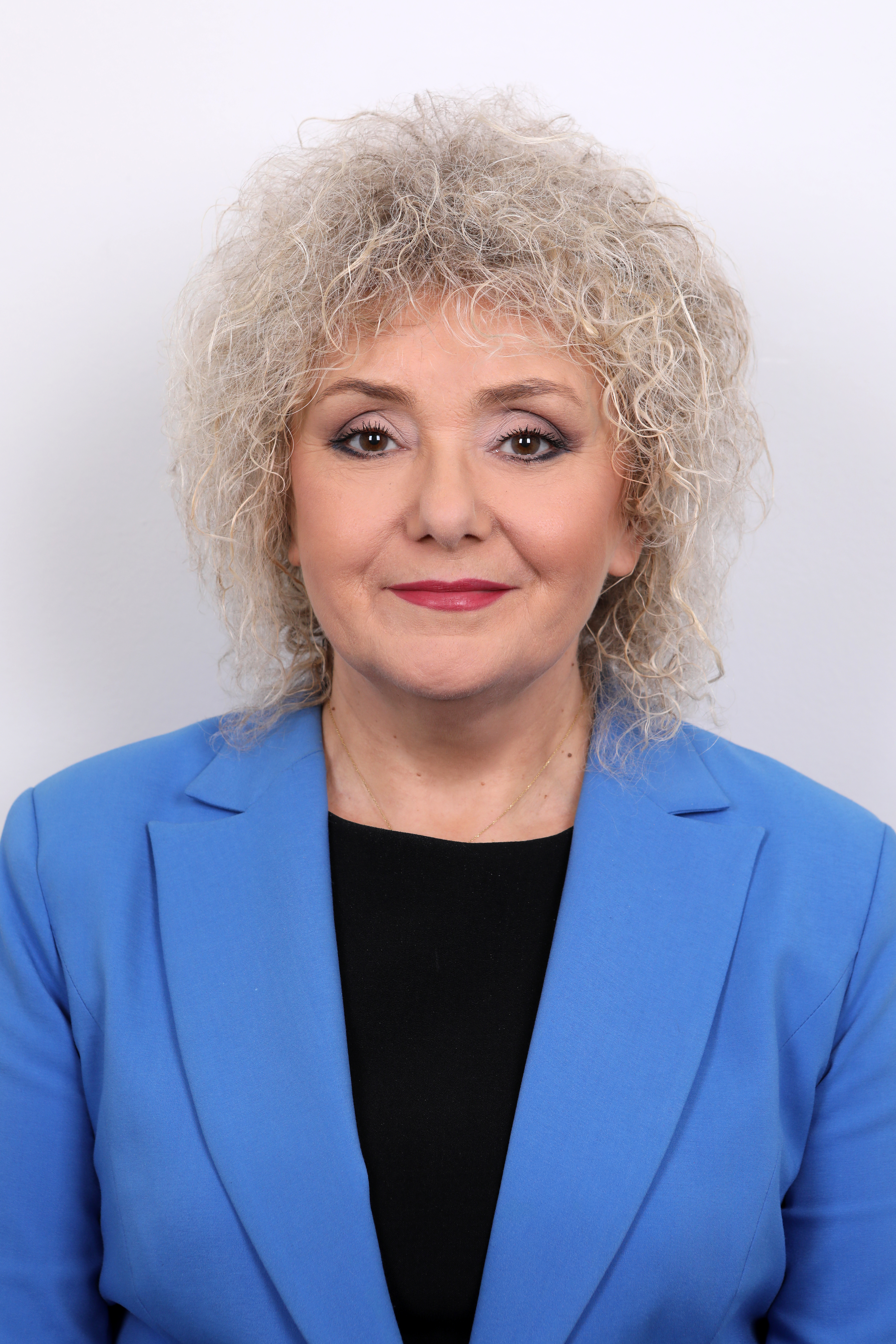

Deputy Marshal of the Senate
- In office 12 November 2015 – 12 November 2019

Personal details
- Born: 1964 (age 61–62) Prudnik, Poland
- Party: Law and Justice
- Education: University of Warsaw
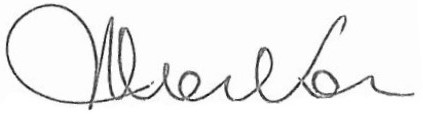
- Signature

Maria Zofia Koc (born 22 August 1964, in Prudnik) is a Polish politician. She has served in the Senate since 2014, and as a Deputy Marshal of the Senate since 2015.

== Biography ==
Maria Koc was brought up in Karolewo, near Węgrów, where she graduated from high school. She holds a degree in cultural anthropology from the University of Warsaw. She has been involved with the Węgrów Cultural Center, and also the Sokolowski Cultural Center in Sokolow Podlaski, of which she served as director between 2001 and 2007.

She served as Deputy Mayor of Węgrów between 2007 and 2008. She later served on the Mazowieckie regional council as a representative of the Law and Justice party. In 2011, she unsuccessfully ran for a parliamentary seat in the Siedlce district.

In September 2014, she was elected Senator following a by-election in District 47 representing the PiS party, receiving the support of 58% of voters. In 2015, she ran successfully ran for a second term. In November 12 2015, she was elected Deputy Marshal of the Senate. She received the Benemerenti medal.
