= Węże =

Węże may refer to the following places in Poland:

- Węże, Łódź Voivodeship (central Poland)
- Węże, Masovian Voivodeship (east-central Poland)
