= Brzozów-Kolonia =

- Village
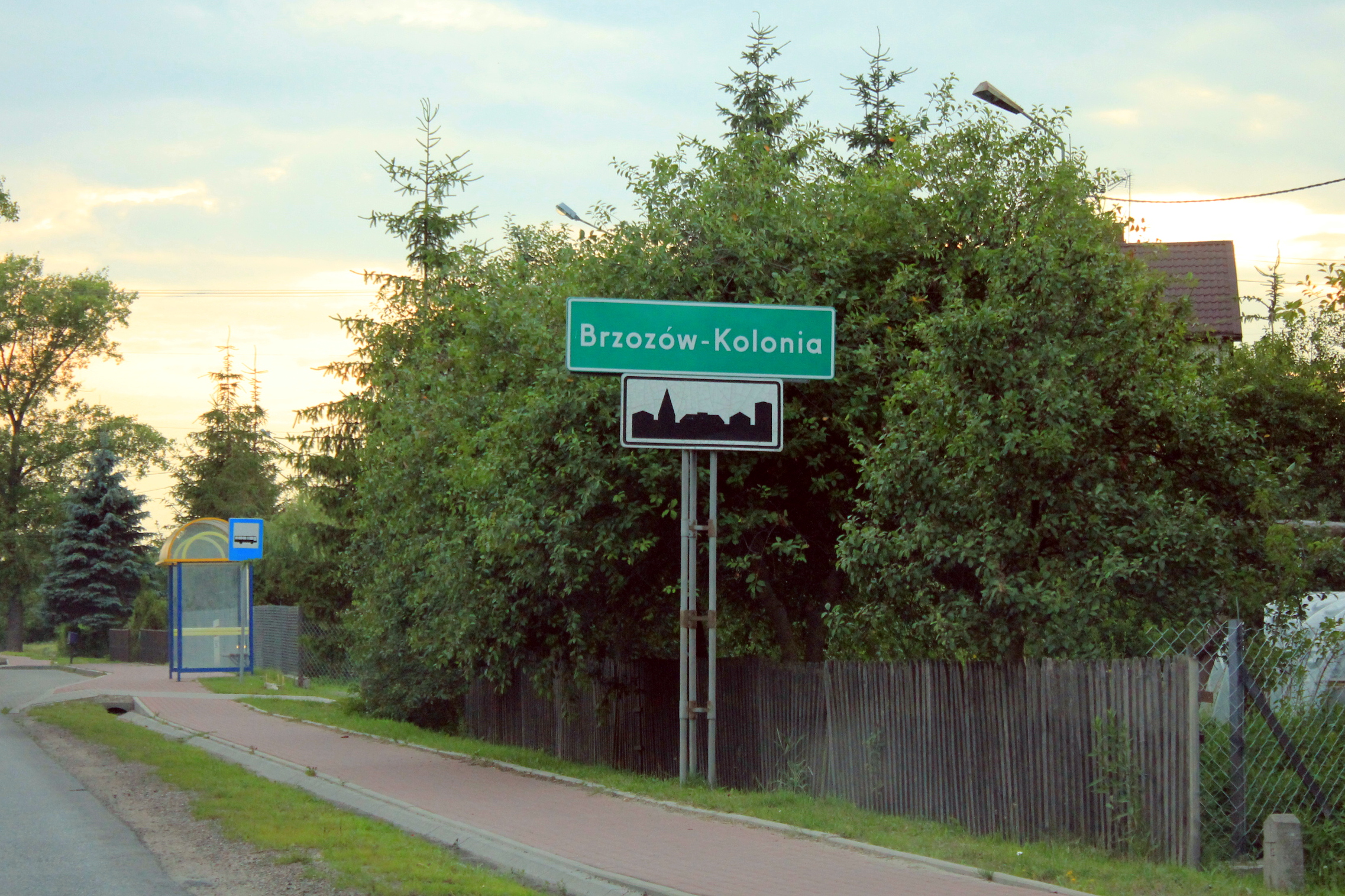

- Location within Poland
- Coordinates: 52°24′11″N 22°10′37″E
- Country: Poland
- Voivodeship: Masovian
- County: Sokołów
- Gmina: Sokołów Podlaski
- Population: 300

Brzozów-Kolonia [ˈbʐɔzuf kɔˈlɔɲa] is a village in the administrative district of Gmina Sokołów Podlaski, within Sokołów County, Masovian Voivodeship, in east-central Poland.
