= Wyrąb =

- Village
- Location within Poland
- Coordinates: 52°26′N 22°18′E
- Country: Poland
- Voivodeship: Masovian
- County: Sokołów
- Gmina: Sokołów Podlaski

Wyrąb [ˈvɨrɔmp] is a village in the administrative district of Gmina Sokołów Podlaski, within Sokołów County, Masovian Voivodeship, in east-central Poland. From 1975–1998, it was part of the Siedlce Voivodeship.
