= Justynów, Sokołów County =

Justynów
- Village
- Location within Poland
- Coordinates: 52°22′21″N 22°7′48″E
- Country: Poland
- Voivodeship: Masovian
- County: Sokołów
- Gmina: Sokołów Podlaski

Justynów [jusˈtɨnuf] is a village in the administrative district of Gmina Sokołów Podlaski, within Sokołów County, Masovian Voivodeship, in east-central Poland.
