= Przywózki =

- Village
- Location within Poland
- Coordinates: 52°22′N 22°12′E
- Country: Poland
- Voivodeship: Masovian
- County: Sokołów
- Gmina: Sokołów Podlaski
- Elevation: 175 m (574 ft)
- Population: 7,203

Przywózki [pʂɨˈvuski] is a village in the administrative district of Gmina Sokołów Podlaski, within Sokołów County, Masovian Voivodeship, in east-central Poland.
