= Łubianki =

- Village
- Location within Poland
- Coordinates: 52°25′55″N 22°14′39″E
- Country: Poland
- Voivodeship: Masovian
- County: Sokołów
- Gmina: Sokołów Podlaski

Łubianki [wuˈbjaŋki] is a village in the administrative district of Gmina Sokołów Podlaski, within Sokołów County, Masovian Voivodeship, in east-central Poland.
