= Krasnodęby-Sypytki =

- Village
- Location within Poland
- Coordinates: 52°22′42″N 22°17′58″E
- Country: Poland
- Voivodeship: Masovian
- County: Sokołów
- Gmina: Sokołów Podlaski

Krasnodęby-Sypytki [krasnɔˈdɛmbɨ sɨˈpɨtki] is a village in the administrative district of Gmina Sokołów Podlaski, within Sokołów County, Masovian Voivodeship, in east-central Poland.
