= Chrystian Piotr Aigner =

Polish architect and writer (1756–1841)

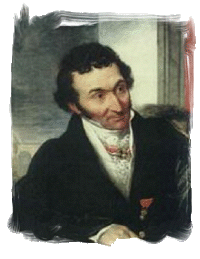
Chrystian Piotr Aigner

Chrystian Piotr Aigner (1756 in Puławy, Poland – 9 February 1841 in Florence, Italy) was a Polish architect and theoretician of architecture.

== Life ==
Chrystian Piotr Aigner acquired extensive knowledge of architecture in the course of several journeys to Italy that he made in the company of his patron and subsequent collaborator and friend Stanisław Kostka Potocki. He studied in Italy. Later, during a long association with the city of Warsaw, he created many Classicist buildings in the Polish capital. A member of Rome's Academy of St. Luke, and of the Warsaw Society of Friends of Learning, and from 1817 a professor of architecture at Warsaw University, he was active in Warsaw until 1825 and in Kraków before leaving for Italy for good in 1827.

Aigner at first applied the decorative forms of early Neoclassicism (Marynka's Palace in Puławy) or made reference to the works of Andrea Palladio (the façade of St. Anne's Church in Warsaw). In a later period, he reworked patterns drawn directly from the architecture of Antiquity (the Puławy parish church; St. Alexander's Church in Warsaw), and even erected Neogothic structures (the Gothic House in Puławy). He also published a pattern book, Budowy kościołów... (Church Building...), which exerted a great influence on Polish sacral architecture in the first half of the 19th century.

Aigner's work represents a mature classicism, inspired directly by Italian influences, and later enriched by Empire and Romantic influences. The Romantic influences, reflecting a growing interest in Poland's past, were expressed chiefly through the use of Neogothic forms and enriched spatial arrangements (palaces with rotunda in a corner). His theoretical writings include "Rozprawa o świątyniach u starożytnych i o słowiańskich," Roczniki Towarzystwa Warszawskiego Przyjaciół Nauk ("A Treatise on Ancient and Slavic Temples," Annals of the Warsaw Society of Friends of Learning), 1808.

During the Kościuszko Uprising, Aigner wrote "Krótka nauka o kosach i pikach" ("A Brief Treatise on Scythes and Pikes"), which provided a theory for operating on the field of battle with formations of scythemen and pikemen.

== Works ==
- Classicist palace in Olesin, Puławy County (1782–1830), with Stanisław Kostka Potocki
- Palace in Igołomia
- Palace in Zarzecze, Przeworsk County
- Remodeling of Łańcut Castle
- Church in Międzyrzec Podlaski
- Czartoryski residence in Puławy (Church of the Assumption, Gothic House, Temple of the Sibyl, Marynka's Palace), 1785–1810
- Church of St. Alexander in Suwałki
- Church of the Holy Apostles Peter and Paul in Żyrzyn
- Epitaph of Kraków Bishop Kajetan Sołtyk in Wawel Cathedral
- Classicist manor house in Bachorza

In Warsaw:

- Krasiński Palace in Ursynów (1785–86), with Stanisław Kostka Potocki, rebuilt in 1858 by Zygmunt Rozpędowski
- Remodeling of Leszno, Warsaw, palace (1785–88), probably only the interiors
- St. Alexander's Church, 1818–25
- Façade of St. Anne's Church (1786–88), with Stanisław Kostka Potocki; rebuilding of bell tower, 1816
- Façade of St. Andrew's Church
- Remodeling of the Warsaw Arsenal (1792)
- Remodeling of main entrance hall at Wilanów Palace (1792)
- Villa of Izabela Lubomirska at Krzeszowice (1792)
- Library of Ignacy Potocki (1788), no longer extant, at site of Warsaw's Hotel Bristol
- Remodeling of Natolin Palace (1808)
- Morysin Summer Palace, near Wilanów, with Stanisław Kostka Potocki
- Mint on ulica Bielańska (demolished in 1905 by Russian Imperial authorities)
- Warsaw University Astronomical Observatory
- Remodeling of the Presidential Palace (formerly, "Viceregal Palace"), 1818–19

== Gallery ==
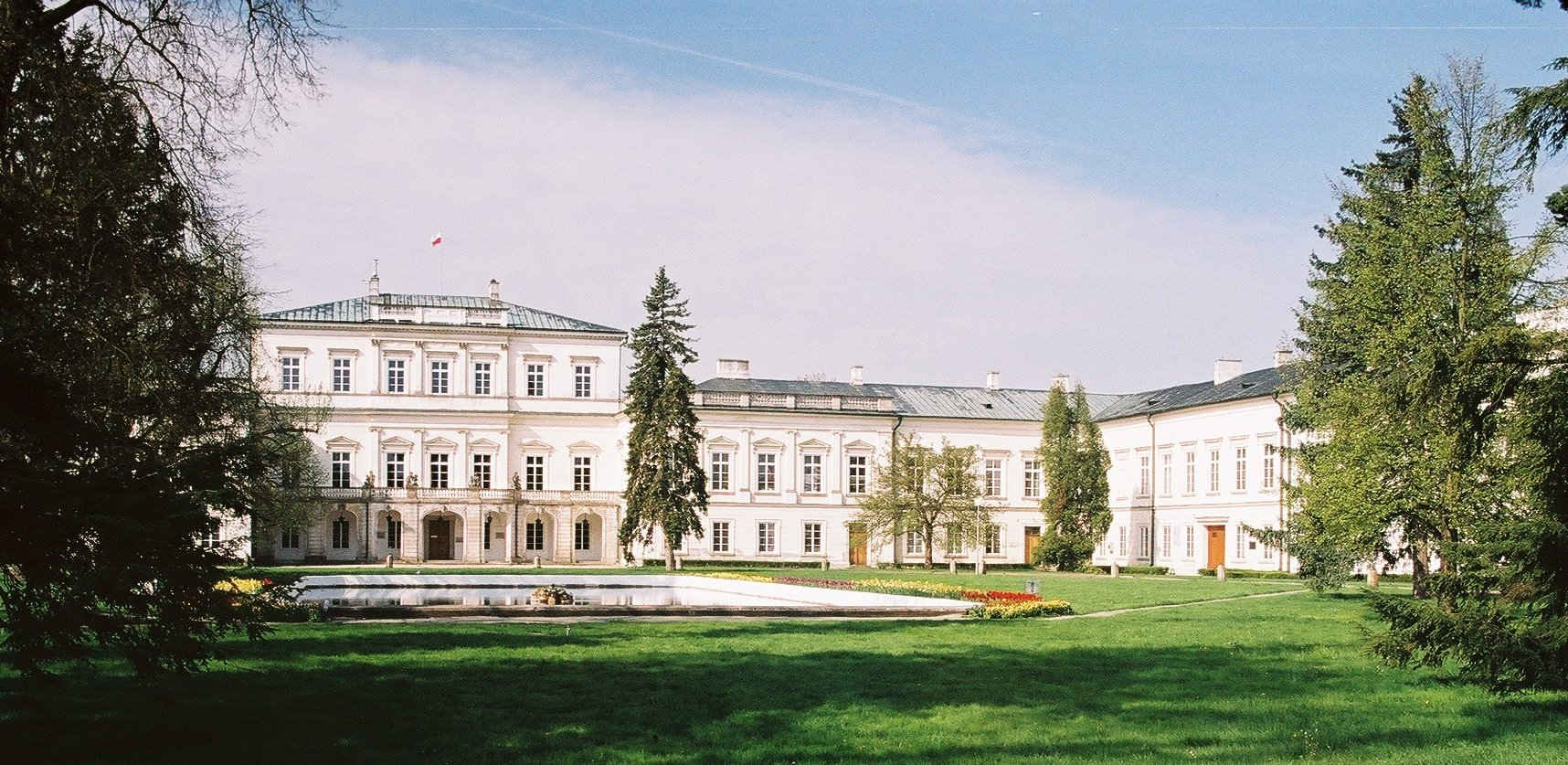
Czartoryski palace, Puławy

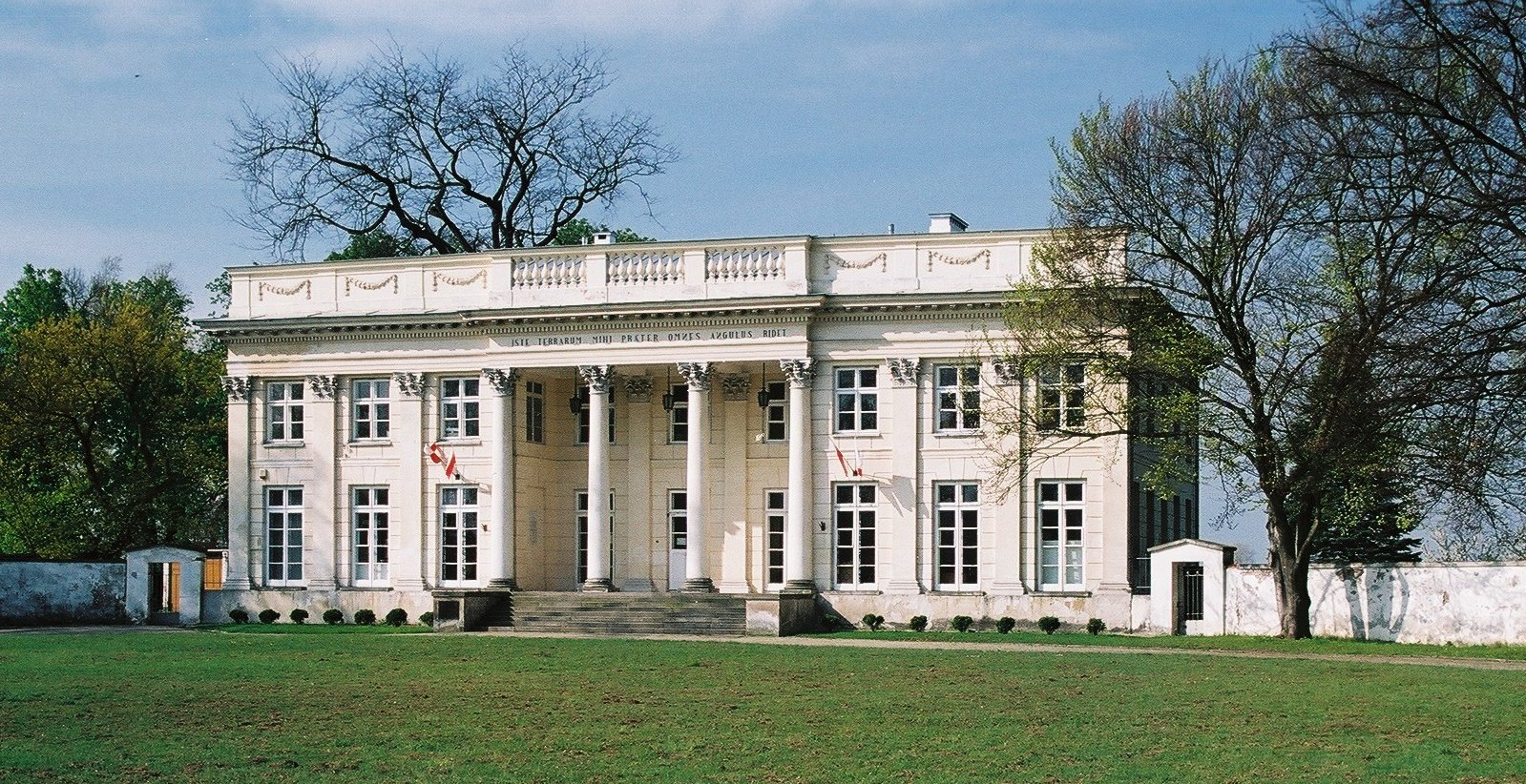
Marynka's Palace, Puławy

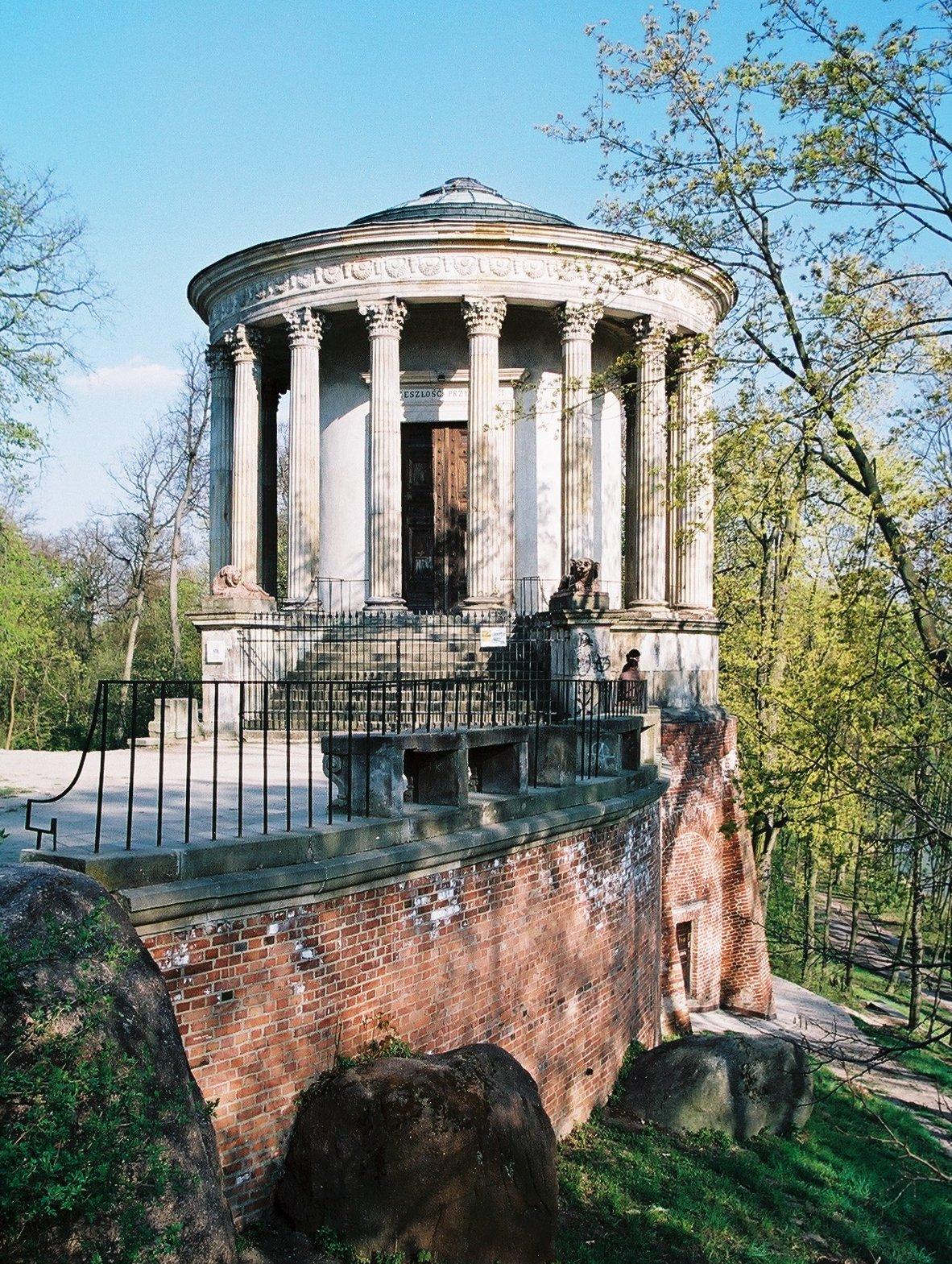
Temple of the Sibyl, Puławy

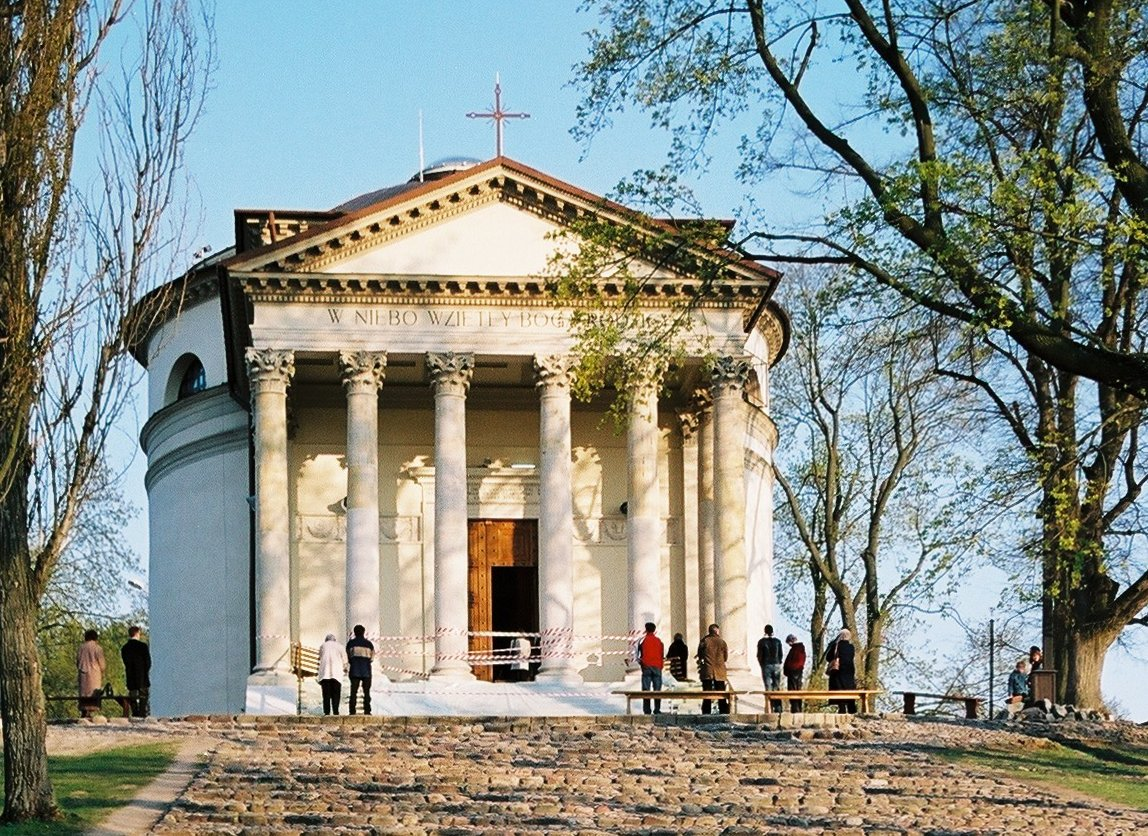
Church of the Assumption, Puławy

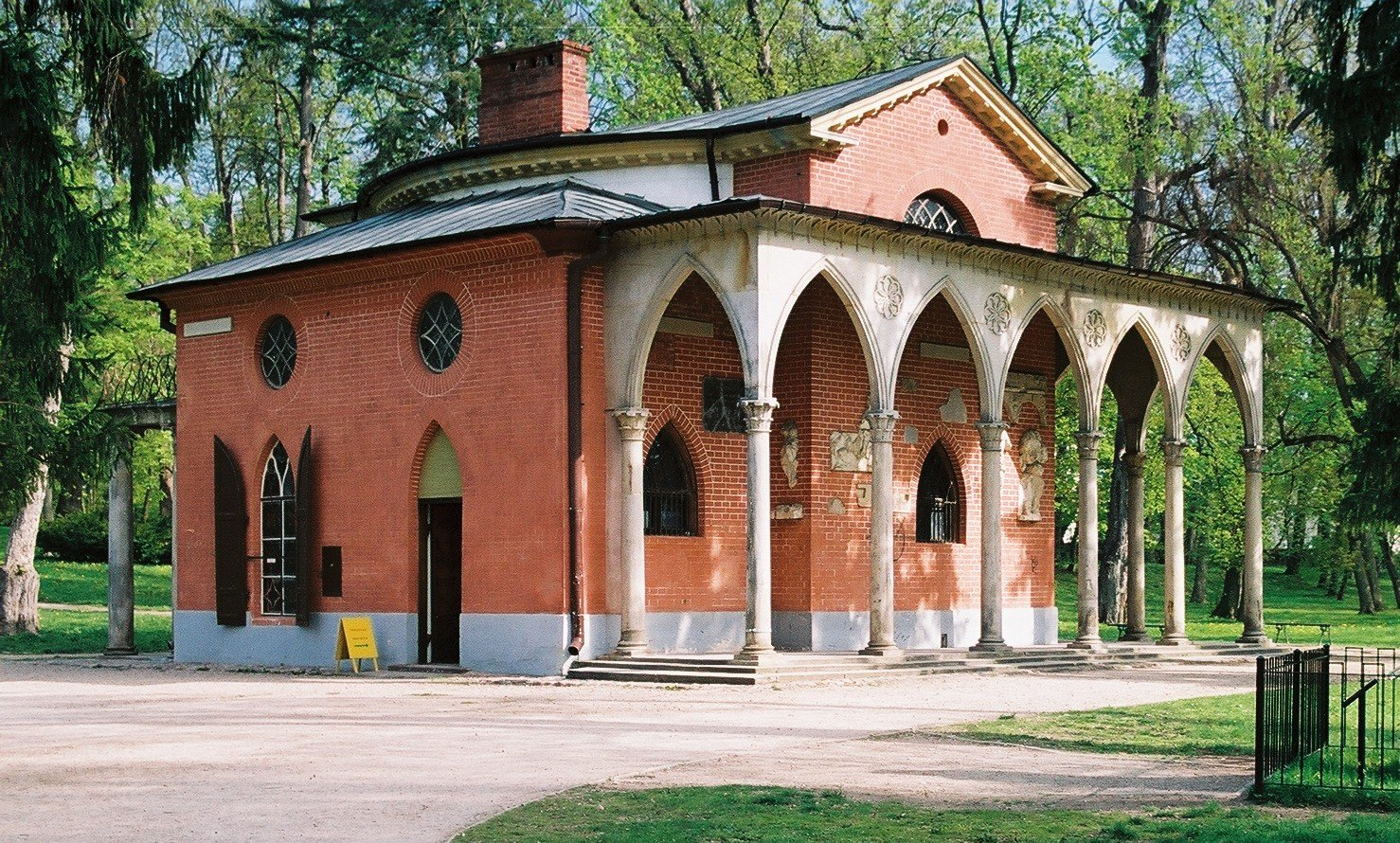
Gothic House, Puławy

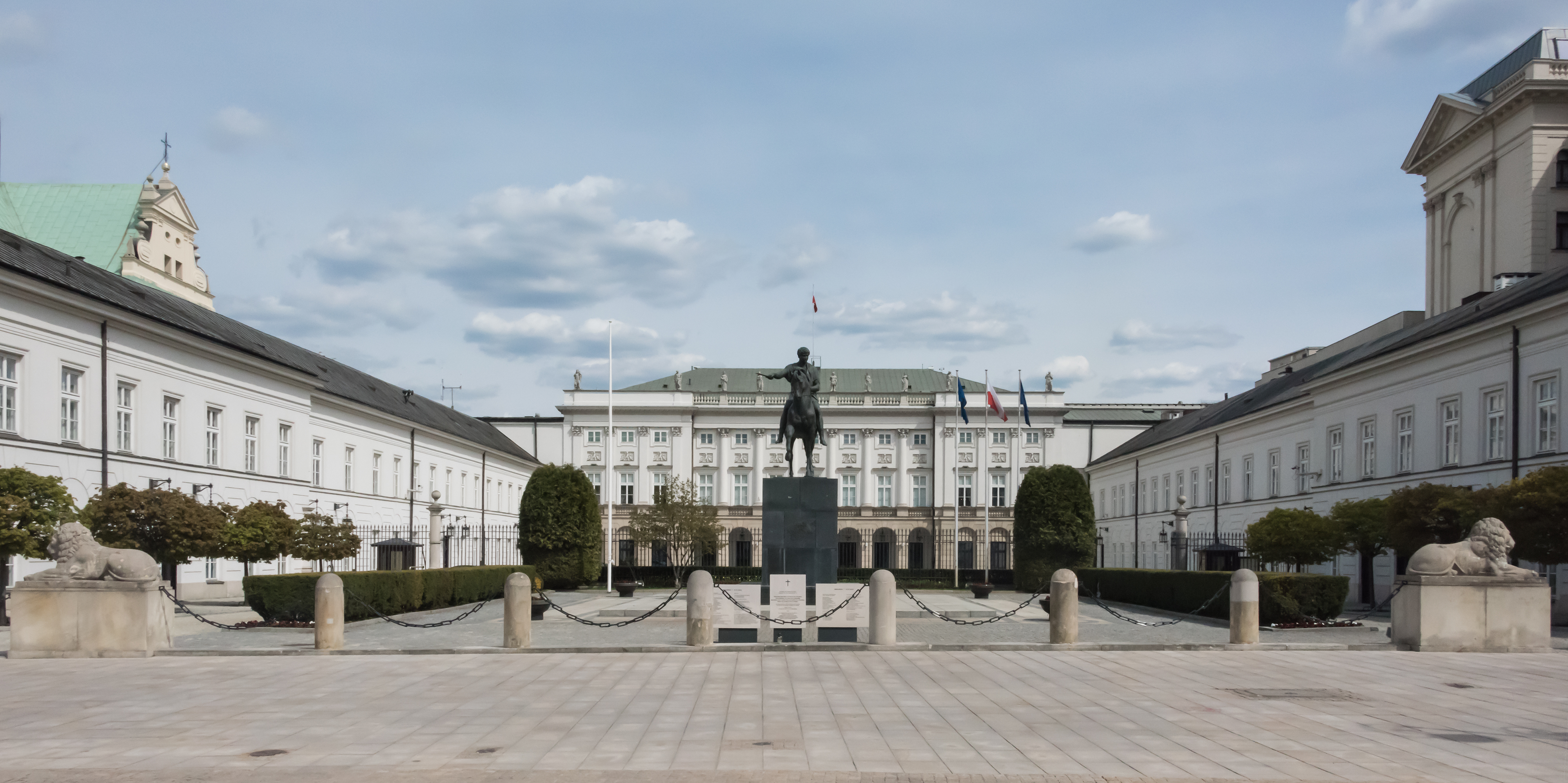
Presidential Palace, Warsaw

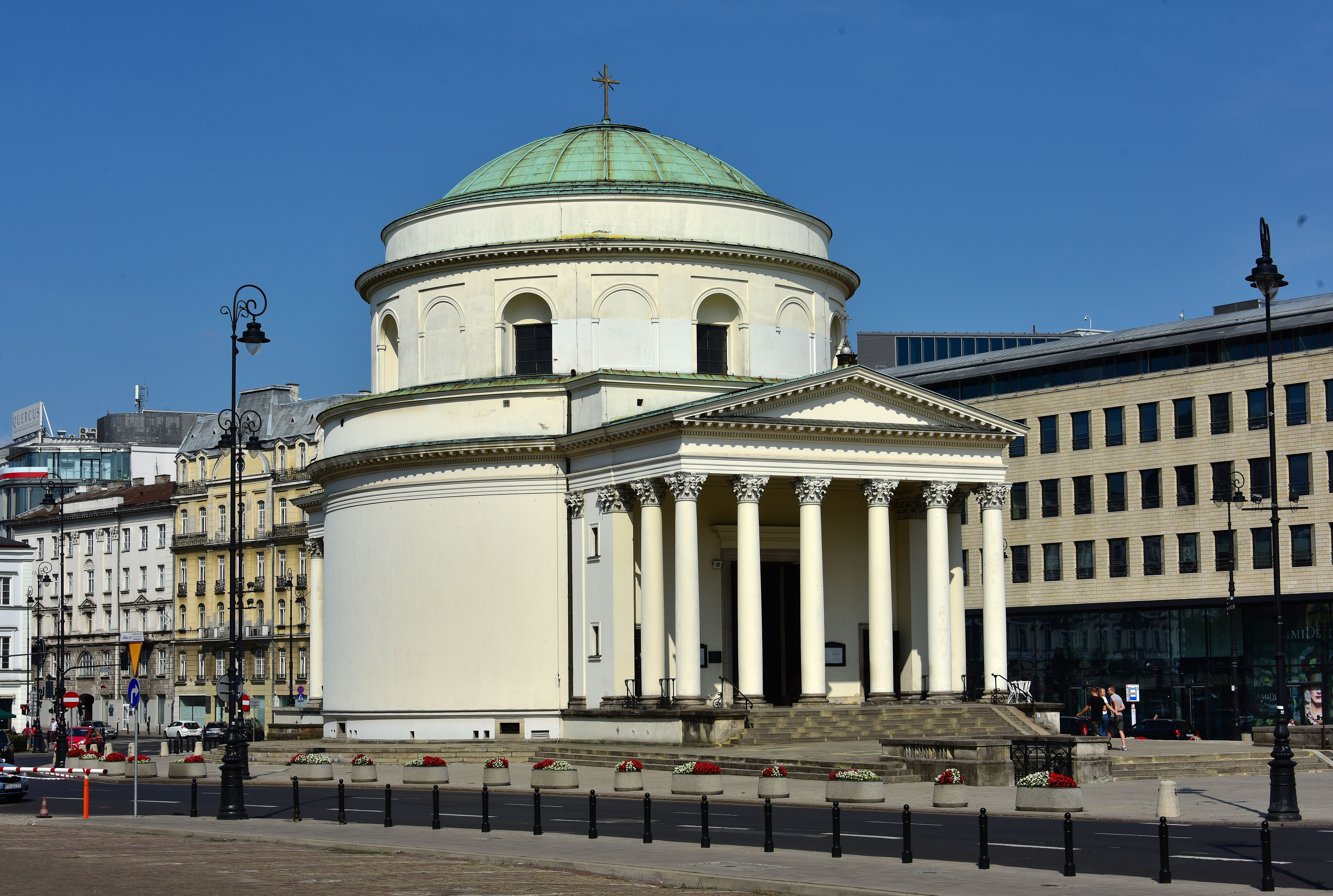
St. Alexander's Church, Warsaw

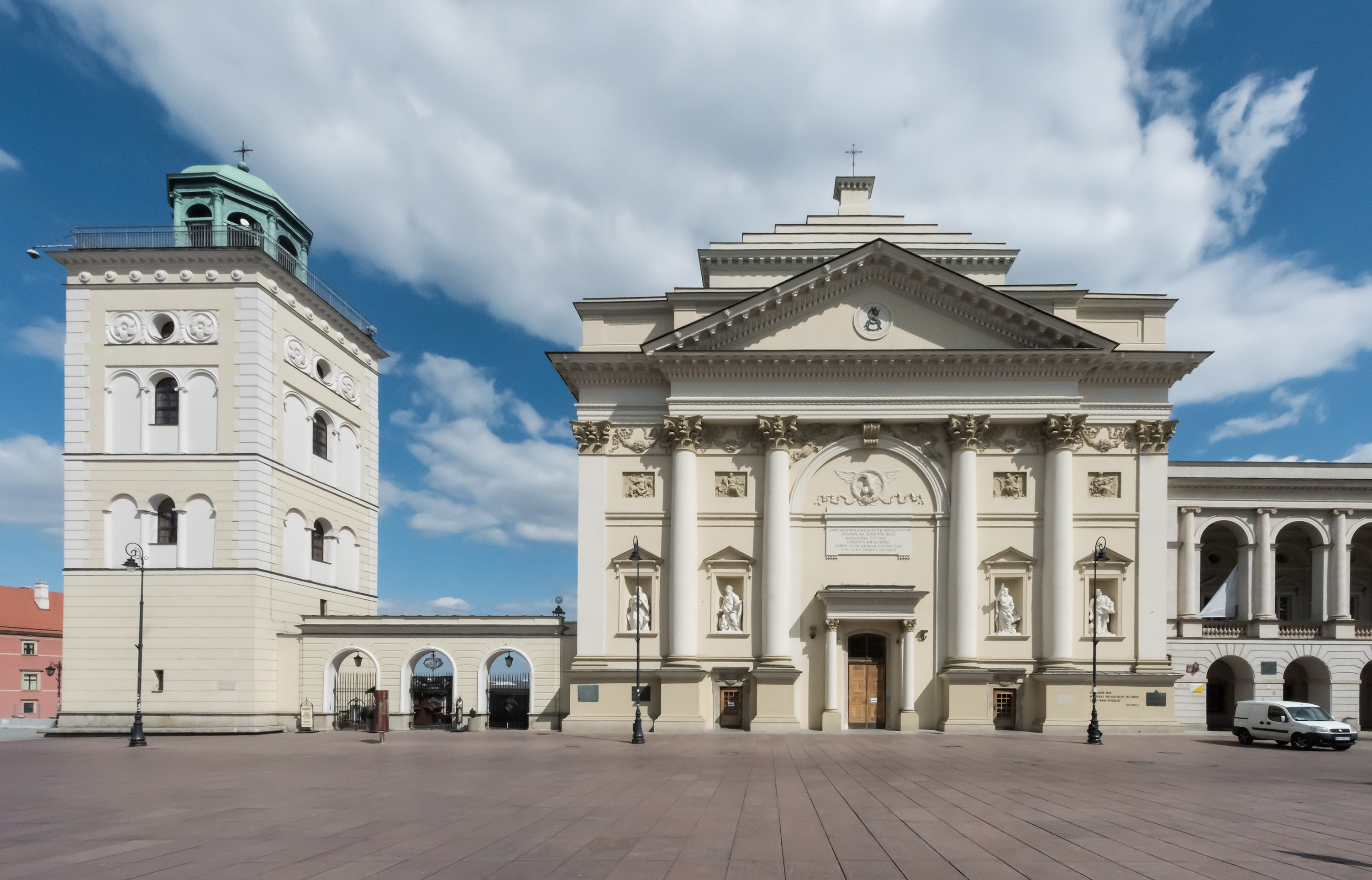
St. Anne's Church, Warsaw

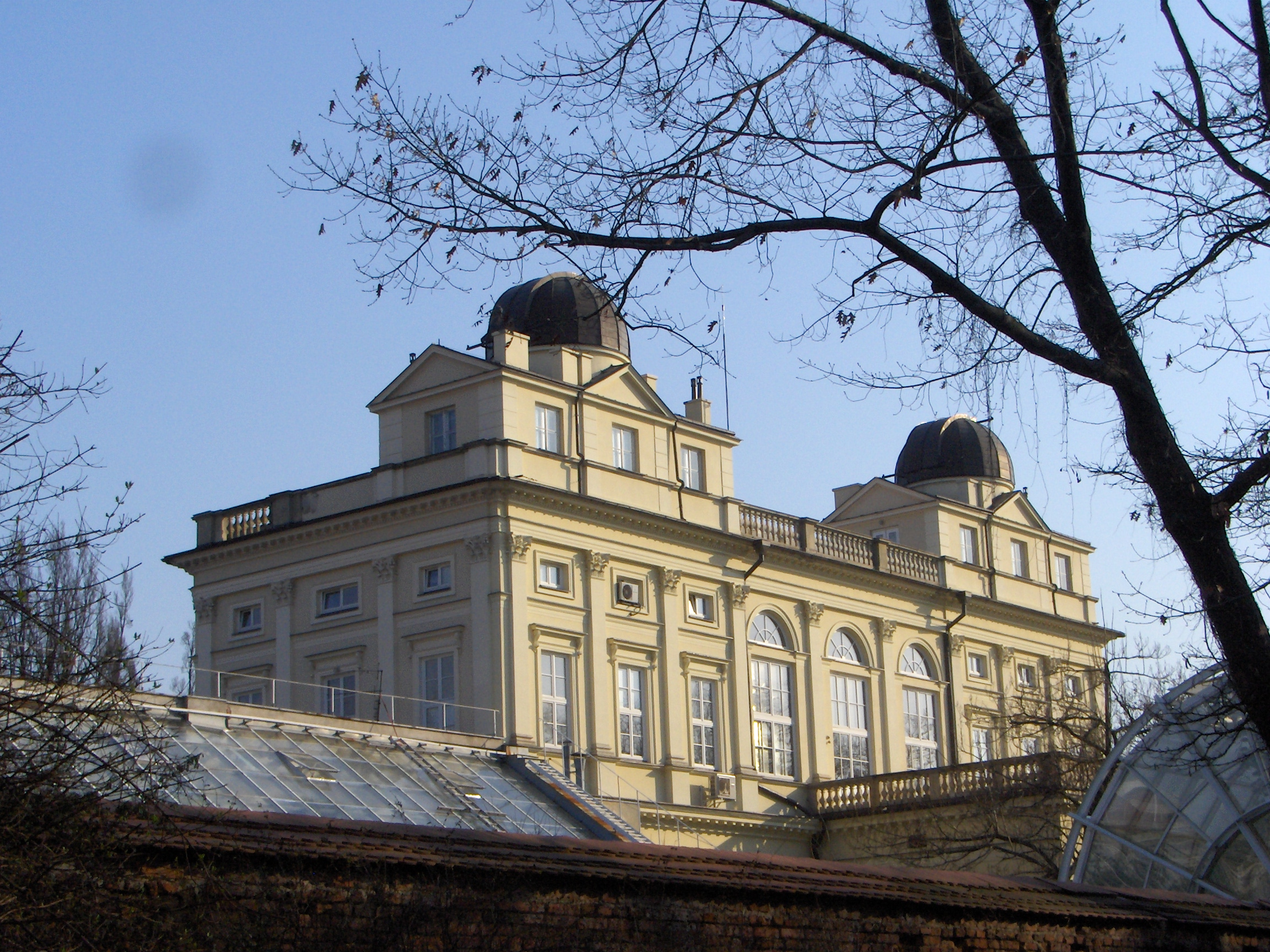
Warsaw University Astronomical Observatory

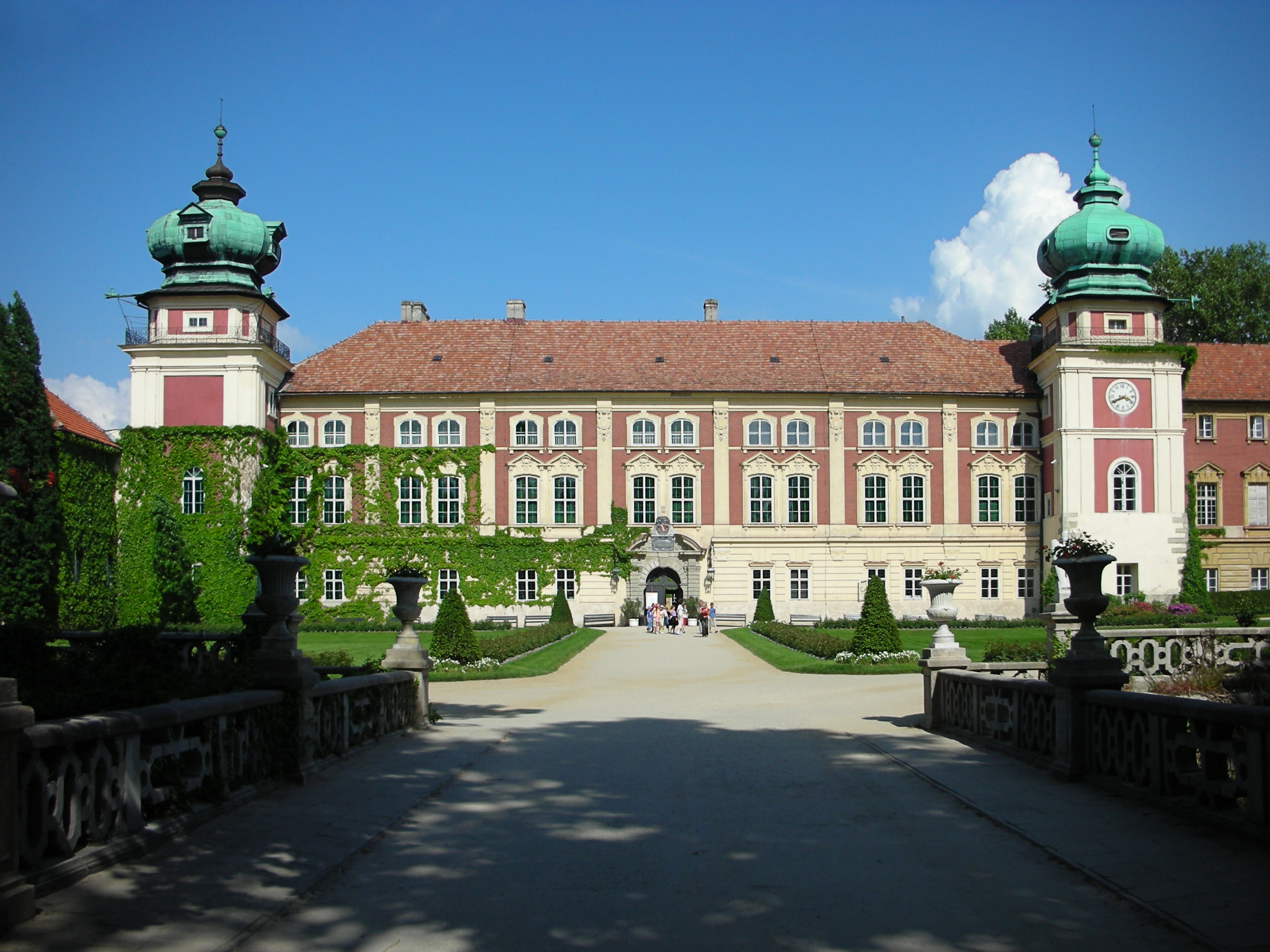
Łańcut Castle

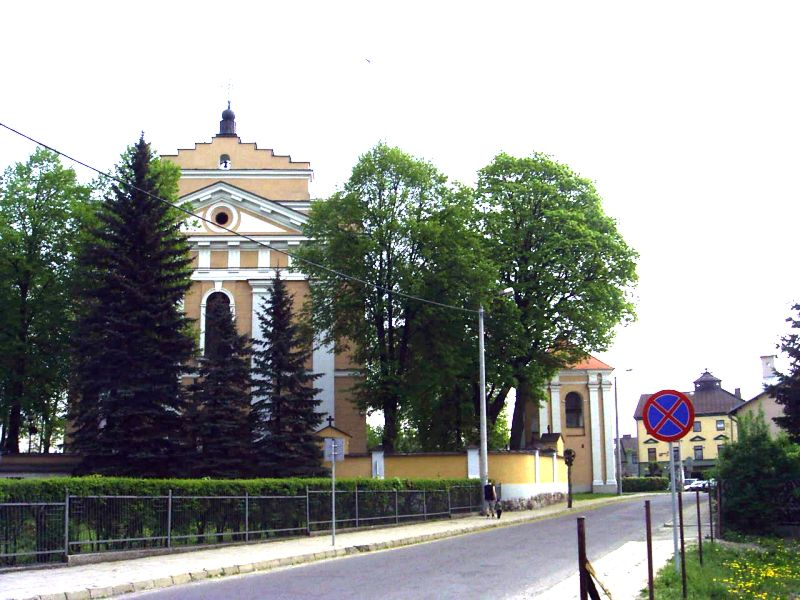
St. Nicholas' Church, in Międzyrzec Podlaski. Neoclassicist façade by Aigner.
