= Grochów, Sokołów County =

Grochów
- Village
- Location within Poland
- Coordinates: 52°23′57″N 22°7′25″E
- Country: Poland
- Voivodeship: Masovian
- County: Sokołów
- Gmina: Sokołów Podlaski
- Population: 360

Grochów [ˈɡrɔxuf] is a village in the administrative district of Gmina Sokołów Podlaski, within Sokołów County, Masovian Voivodeship, in east-central Poland.
