= Gmina Sokołów Podlaski =

Gmina Sokołów Podlaski Sokołów Podlaski Commune
- Gmina
- Interactive map of Gmina Sokołów Podlaski
- Coordinates (Sokołów Podlaski): 52°24′24″N 22°14′47″E
- Country: Poland
- Voivodeship: Masovian
- County: Sokołów
- Seat: Sokołów Podlaski

Area
  - Total: 137.18 km^{2} (52.97 sq mi)

Population (2013)
  - Total: 6,088
  - Density: 44.38/km^{2} (114.9/sq mi)
- Website: http://www.gminasokolowpodl.pl

Gmina Sokołów Podlaski is a rural gmina (administrative district) in Sokołów County, Masovian Voivodeship, in east-central Poland. Its seat is the town of Sokołów Podlaski, although the town is not part of the territory of the gmina.

The gmina covers an area of 137.18 square kilometres (53.0 sq mi), and as of 2006 its total population is 6,157 (6,088 in 2013).

== Villages ==
Gmina Sokołów Podlaski contains the villages and settlements of Bachorza, Bartosz, Brzozów, Brzozów-Kolonia, Budy Kupientyńskie, Chmielew, Czerwonka, Dąbrowa, Dolne Pole, Dziegietnia, Emilianów, Grochów, Justynów, Karlusin, Karolew, Kosierady Wielkie, Kostki, Krasnodęby-Kasmy, Krasnodęby-Rafały, Krasnodęby-Sypytki, Krasów, Łubianki, Nowa Wieś, Podkupientyn, Podrogów, Pogorzel, Przeździatka-Kolonia, Przywózki, Skibniew-Kurcze, Skibniew-Podawce, Walerów, Węże, Wólka Miedzyńska, Wyrąb, Ząbków and Żanecin.

== Neighbouring gminas ==
Gmina Sokołów Podlaski is bordered by the towns of Sokołów Podlaski and Węgrów, and by the gminas of Bielany, Jabłonna Lacka, Kosów Lacki, Liw, Miedzna, Repki, Sabnie, Siedlce and Sterdyń.
