= Czerwonka, Sokołów County =

Czerwonka
- Village
- Location within Poland
- Coordinates: 52°23′6″N 22°9′19″E
- Country: Poland
- Voivodeship: Masovian
- County: Sokołów
- Gmina: Sokołów Podlaski
- Time zone: UTC+1 (CET)
  - Summer (DST): UTC+2 (CEST)

Czerwonka [t͡ʂɛrˈvɔnka] is a village in the administrative district of Gmina Sokołów Podlaski, within Sokołów County, Masovian Voivodeship, in eastern Poland.

Five Polish citizens were murdered by Nazi Germany in the village during World War II.
