= Przeździatka-Kolonia =

- Village
- Location within Poland
- Coordinates: 52°28′N 22°09′E
- Country: Poland
- Voivodeship: Masovian
- County: Sokołów
- Gmina: Sokołów Podlaski

Przeździatka-Kolonia [pʂɛʑˈd͡ʑatka kɔˈlɔɲa] is a village in the administrative district of Gmina Sokołów Podlaski, within Sokołów County, Masovian Voivodeship, in east-central Poland.
