= Dolne Pole, Masovian Voivodeship =

Dolne Pole
- Village
- Location within Poland
- Coordinates: 52°22′N 22°9′E
- Country: Poland
- Voivodeship: Masovian
- County: Sokołów
- Gmina: Sokołów Podlaski

Dolne Pole [ˈdɔlnɛ ˈpɔlɛ] is a village in the administrative district of Gmina Sokołów Podlaski, within Sokołów County, Masovian Voivodeship, in east-central Poland.
