= Brzozów, Sokołów County =

Brzozów
- Village
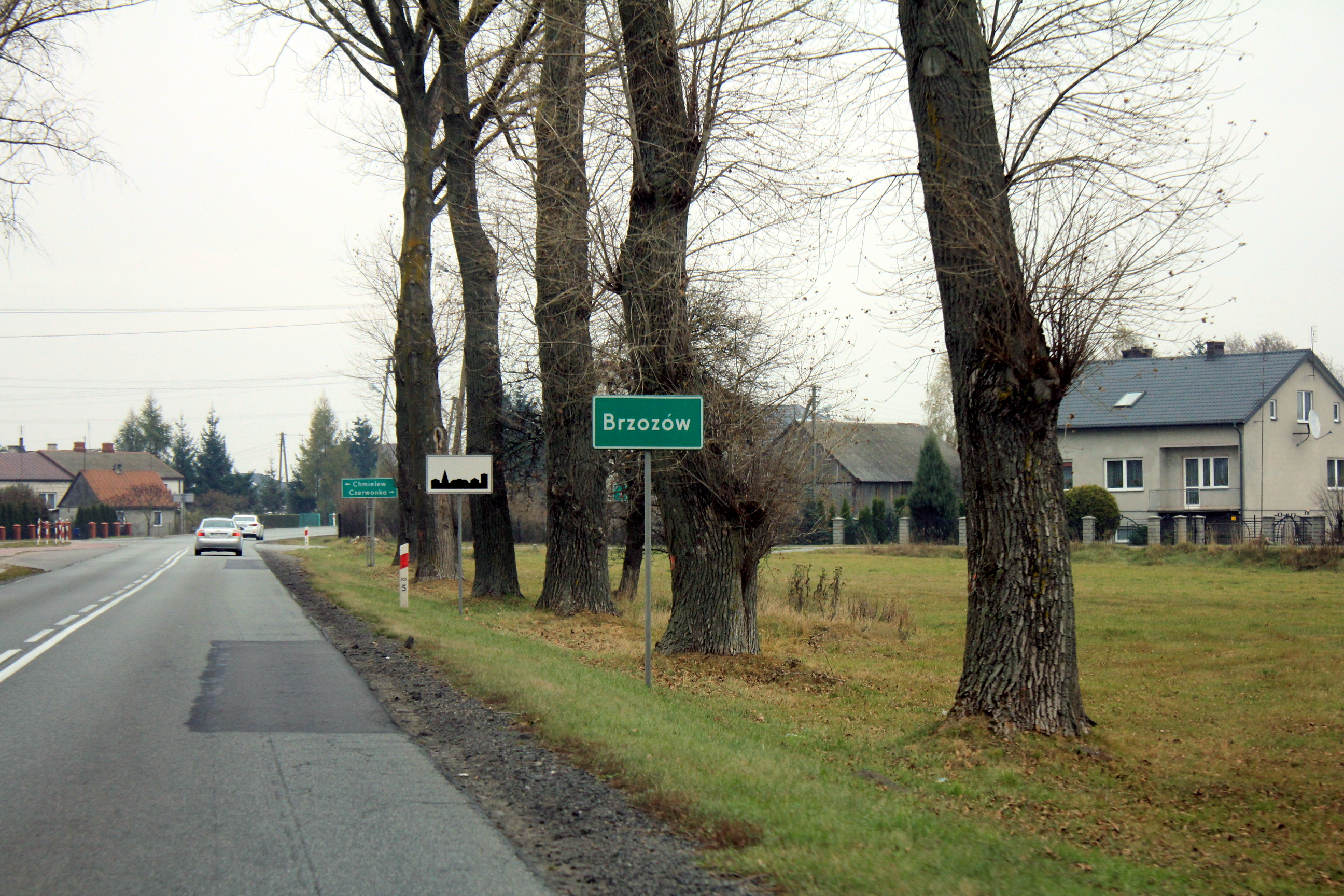

- Location within Poland
- Coordinates: 52°24′38″N 22°10′1″E
- Country: Poland
- Voivodeship: Masovian
- County: Sokołów
- Gmina: Sokołów Podlaski
- Population: 177

Brzozów [ˈbʐɔzuf] is a village in the administrative district of Gmina Sokołów Podlaski, within Sokołów County, Masovian Voivodeship, in east-central Poland.
