= Emilianów, Sokołów County =

Emilianów
- Village
- Location within Poland
- Coordinates: 52°28′21″N 22°11′24″E
- Country: Poland
- Voivodeship: Masovian
- County: Sokołów
- Gmina: Sokołów Podlaski

Emilianów [ɛmiˈljanuf] is a village in the administrative district of Gmina Sokołów Podlaski, within Sokołów County, Masovian Voivodeship, in east-central Poland.
