= Dąbrowa, Sokołów County =

Dąbrowa
- Village
- Location within Poland
- Coordinates: 52°24′24″N 22°6′21″E
- Country: Poland
- Voivodeship: Masovian
- County: Sokołów
- Gmina: Sokołów Podlaski

Dąbrowa [dɔmˈbrɔva] is a village in the administrative district of Gmina Sokołów Podlaski, within Sokołów County, Masovian Voivodeship, in east-central Poland.
