= Krasnodęby-Kasmy =

- Village
- Location within Poland
- Coordinates: 52°22′52″N 22°19′0″E
- Country: Poland
- Voivodeship: Masovian
- County: Sokołów
- Gmina: Sokołów Podlaski

Krasnodęby-Kasmy [krasnɔˈdɛmbɨ ˈkasmɨ] is a village in the administrative district of Gmina Sokołów Podlaski, within Sokołów County, Masovian Voivodeship, in east-central Poland.
