= Budy Kupientyńskie =

- Village
- Location within Poland
- Coordinates: 52°26′48″N 22°13′31″E
- Country: Poland
- Voivodeship: Masovian
- County: Sokołów
- Gmina: Sokołów Podlaski

Budy Kupientyńskie [ˈbudɨ kupjɛnˈtɨɲskʲɛ] is a village in the administrative district of Gmina Sokołów Podlaski, within Sokołów County, Masovian Voivodeship, in east-central Poland.
