= Nowa Wieś, Sokołów County =

Nowa Wieś
- Village
- Location within Poland
- Coordinates: 52°26′16″N 22°12′8″E
- Country: Poland
- Voivodeship: Masovian
- County: Sokołów
- Gmina: Sokołów Podlaski
- Population: 608

Nowa Wieś [ˈnɔva ˈvjɛɕ] is a village in the administrative district of Gmina Sokołów Podlaski, within Sokołów County, Masovian Voivodeship, in east-central Poland.
