= Chmielew, Sokołów County =

Chmielew
- Village
- Location within Poland
- Coordinates: 52°24′56″N 22°9′23″E
- Country: Poland
- Voivodeship: Masovian
- County: Sokołów
- Gmina: Sokołów Podlaski

Chmielew [ˈxmjɛlɛf] is a village in the administrative district of Gmina Sokołów Podlaski, within Sokołów County, Masovian Voivodeship, in east-central Poland.
