= Żanecin =

- Village
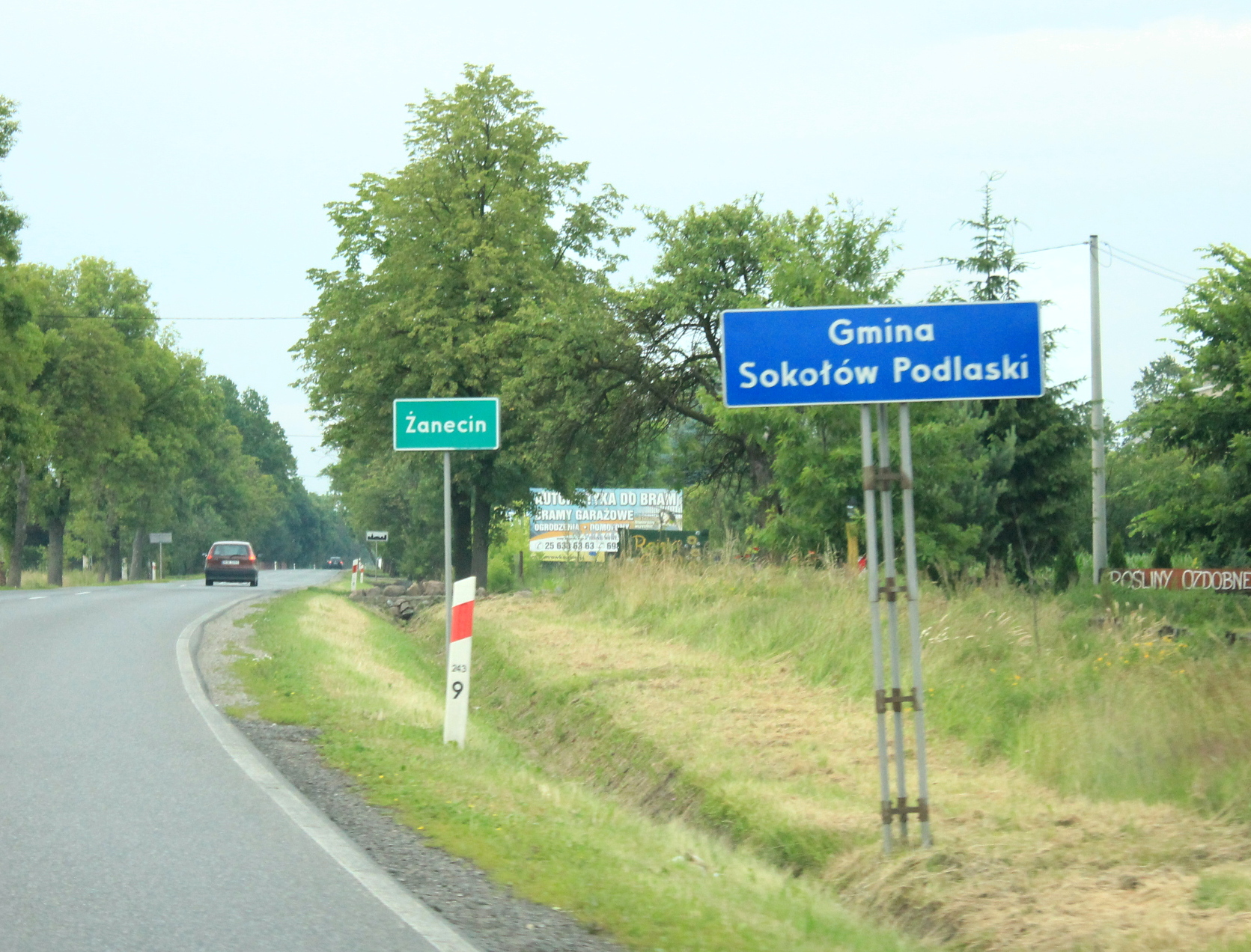

- Location within Poland
- Coordinates: 52°23′N 22°15′E
- Country: Poland
- Voivodeship: Masovian
- County: Sokołów
- Gmina: Sokołów Podlaski

Żanecin [ʐaˈnɛt͡ɕin] is a village in the administrative district of Gmina Sokołów Podlaski, within Sokołów County, Masovian Voivodeship, in east-central Poland.
