= Krasów, Masovian Voivodeship =

Krasów
- Village
- Location within Poland
- Coordinates: 52°22′27″N 22°10′18″E
- Country: Poland
- Voivodeship: Masovian
- County: Sokołów
- Gmina: Sokołów Podlaski

Krasów [ˈkrasuf] is a village in the administrative district of Gmina Sokołów Podlaski, within Sokołów County, Masovian Voivodeship, in east-central Poland.
