= Karlusin =

- Village
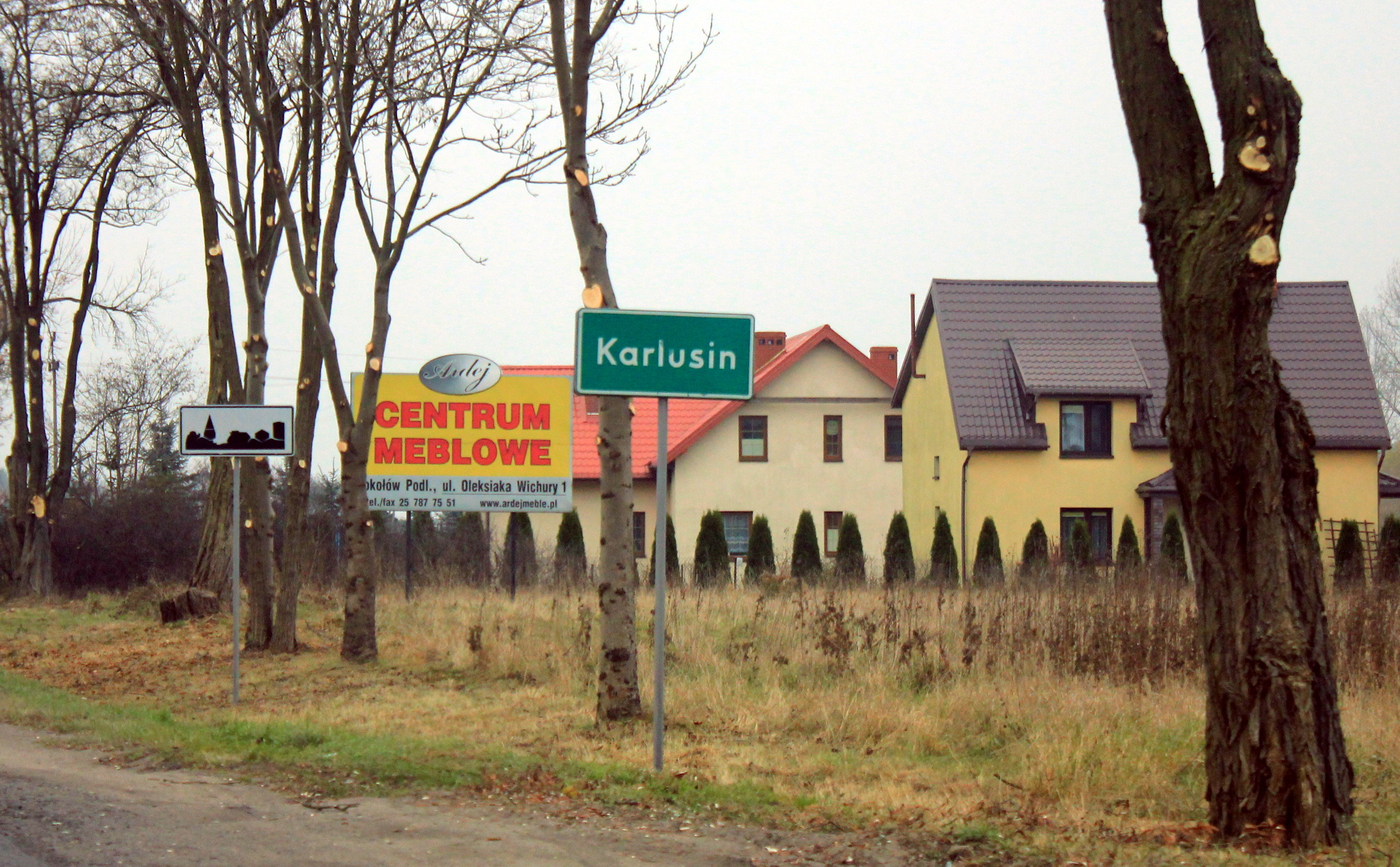

- Location within Poland
- Coordinates: 52°23′40″N 22°17′0″E
- Country: Poland
- Voivodeship: Masovian
- County: Sokołów
- Gmina: Sokołów Podlaski

Karlusin [karˈluɕin] is a village in the administrative district of Gmina Sokołów Podlaski, within Sokołów County, Masovian Voivodeship, in east-central Poland.
