= Pogorzel, Sokołów County =

Pogorzel
- Village
- Location within Poland
- Coordinates: 52°29′35″N 22°8′40″E
- Country: Poland
- Voivodeship: Masovian
- County: Sokołów
- Gmina: Sokołów Podlaski

Pogorzel [pɔˈɡɔʐɛl] is a village in the administrative district of Gmina Sokołów Podlaski, within Sokołów County, Masovian Voivodeship, in east-central Poland.
