= Bartosz, Masovian Voivodeship =

Bartosz
- Village
- Location within Poland
- Coordinates: 52°23′11″N 22°13′22″E
- Country: Poland
- Voivodeship: Masovian
- County: Sokołów
- Gmina: Sokołów Podlaski
- Population: 40

Bartosz [ˈbartɔʂ] is a village in the administrative district of Gmina Sokołów Podlaski, within Sokołów County, Masovian Voivodeship, in east-central Poland.
