= Skibniew-Kurcze =

- Village
- Location within Poland
- Coordinates: 52°30′4″N 22°10′36″E
- Country: Poland
- Voivodeship: Masovian
- County: Sokołów
- Gmina: Sokołów Podlaski

Skibniew-Kurcze [ˈskibɲɛf ˈkurt͡ʂɛ] is a village situated in the administrative district of Gmina Sokołów Podlaski, within Sokołów County, Masovian Voivodeship in east-central Poland.

== See also ==
- Skibniew-Podawce
- Skibniewski
