= Skibniew-Podawce =

- Village
- Location within Poland
- Coordinates: 52°29′46″N 22°11′20″E
- Country: Poland
- Voivodeship: Masovian
- County: Sokołów
- Gmina: Sokołów Podlaski

Skibniew-Podawce [ˈskibɲɛf pɔˈdaft͡sɛ] is a village in the administrative district of Gmina Sokołów Podlaski, within Sokołów County, Masovian Voivodeship, in east-central Poland.

== See also ==
- Skibniew-Kurcze
- Skibniewski
