= Bachorza Manor =

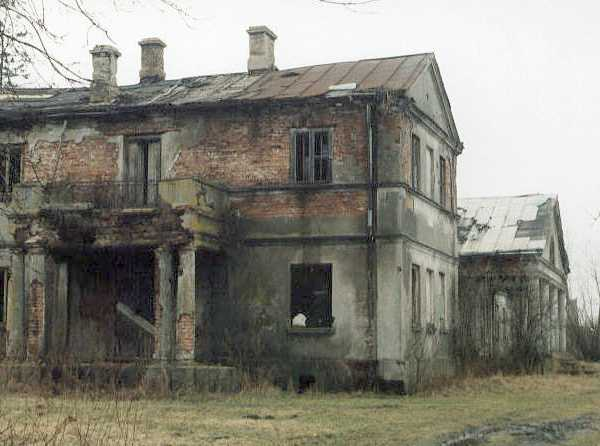

General information
- Architectural style: Polish neo-classical
- Location: Bachorza, Sokołów County, Poland
- Coordinates: 52°23′36″N 22°18′43″E
- Year(s) built: c. 1850

Design and construction
- Architect(s): Chrystian Piotr Aigner
- Designations: immovable monument

Bachorza is a manor house located in the village of Bachorza in Masovian Voivodeship, in central-eastern Poland. It was originally built in the late 17th century, but was subsequently redesigned in the mid-19th century. Bachorza was home to many distinguished Polish families and is a good example of neo-classical Polish manorial architecture.

== History ==
The Bachorza estate was initially held by the aristocratic families of Radziwiłł, Krasiński, Ogiński and Kobyliński. In the mid-19th century the house was sold to Dernalowicz of Repek family, who rebuilt the manor in a neoclassical style.

At the beginning of the 20th century the house, together with the estate, was sold to count Antoni Odrow-Wysocki, who used it as a hunting lodge. Count Odrowąż-Wysocki died suddenly in 1935 and his family sold Bachorza to Teofil Dołęga-Zaleski, a nobleman and landowner related to the counts Dołęga-Zaleski.

Dołęga-Zaleski owned the manor until 1945, when it was taken over by the Red Army. Uncared for, it subsequently fell into ruin. There was an unsuccessful attempt by the Zaleski's descendants to claim it back in the 1990s.

== The haunted house ==
According to a legend, Bachorza is a haunted house. Both its lords and their servants reported odd sounds coming from empty rooms; also, the paintings were supposed to disappear or move during the night. This myth purportedly affected the selling price of the house in 1935; Dołęga-Zaleski, who purchased Bachorza that year, claimed not to believe these rumours, yet his wife and the last lady of the manor, Natalia Dołęga-Zaleska née Ślepowron-Roman, maintained to have seen a parade of phantoms dressed in an old fashioned way shortly before her death in 1942.

== Architecture ==
The manor in its current form was built around 1850 in accordance with a design by Chrystian Piotr Aigner, a renowned Polish neoclassical architect. The main section of the building is one storey high and its central feature is the entrance decorated with a portico seating on a tetrastyle colonnade and enclosed by a simple pediment. The middle section is surrounded on both sides by two-storey high wings, each equipped with a porch supporting a balcony.

Until 1943, the house was seated in a large, English park with oak and maple trees. The park is currently disintegrating and the only remaining feature is a long avenue surrounded by poplar trees leading from the gate to the main entrance of the manor.

Bachorza is an excellent example of a dwór (a Polish manor house). It features all of its typical elements, such as the portico supported by a colonnade and a winged plan, which were designed in a particularly proportional manner. It also exemplifies the contemporary disintegration of the Polish manorial architecture, caused primarily by the lack of funds for its restoration.

== See also ==
- Dwór (manor house)
- Neoclassical architecture
- Szlachta
