= Skibniewski =

Ślepowron coat of arms used by some of Skibniewski family

Skibniewski (feminine: Skibniewska) is a Polish surname. Some of them use Ślepowron coat of arms, also see Skibniewscy herbu Ślepowron. It may be transliterated as Skibniewsky, Skibnievsky, Skibnewsky, Skibnevsky, Скибневский, Скібнєвський. Notable people with the surname include:

- Alexander Skibnevsky (1903–1978), Soviet director
- Aleksander Skibniewski of (1868–1942), Polish social activist, doctor of law, member of the Diet of Bukovina
- Bronisław Skibniewski (1830–1904) Polish landowner, owner of the Balychi, financier, vice-president of the Agricultural Bank in Lviv
- Dżennet Dżabagi-Skibniewska (1915–1992), Polish Tatar, soldier and journalist
- Halina Skibniewska (1921–2011), Polish architect, lecturer at the Warsaw University of Technology, member of the Sejm
- Maria Skibniewska (née Skibińska; 1904–1984), Polish translator
- Mariusz Skibniewski (1881–1939), Polish priest, Jesuit, Church historian, professor at the Pontifical Oriental Institute in Rome
- Mirosław J. Skibniewski (born 1957), Polish American professor of construction engineering at University of Maryland
- Robert Skibniewski (born 1983), Polish basketball player
- Zygmunt Skibniewski (1905–1994), Polish architect, professor at the Warsaw University of Technology, member of the Sejm

== See also ==
- Skibniew-Kurcze and Skibniew-Podawce, villages in Sokołów County, Masovian Voivodeship, east-central Poland
