= Bachorza, Sokołów County =

Bachorza
- Village
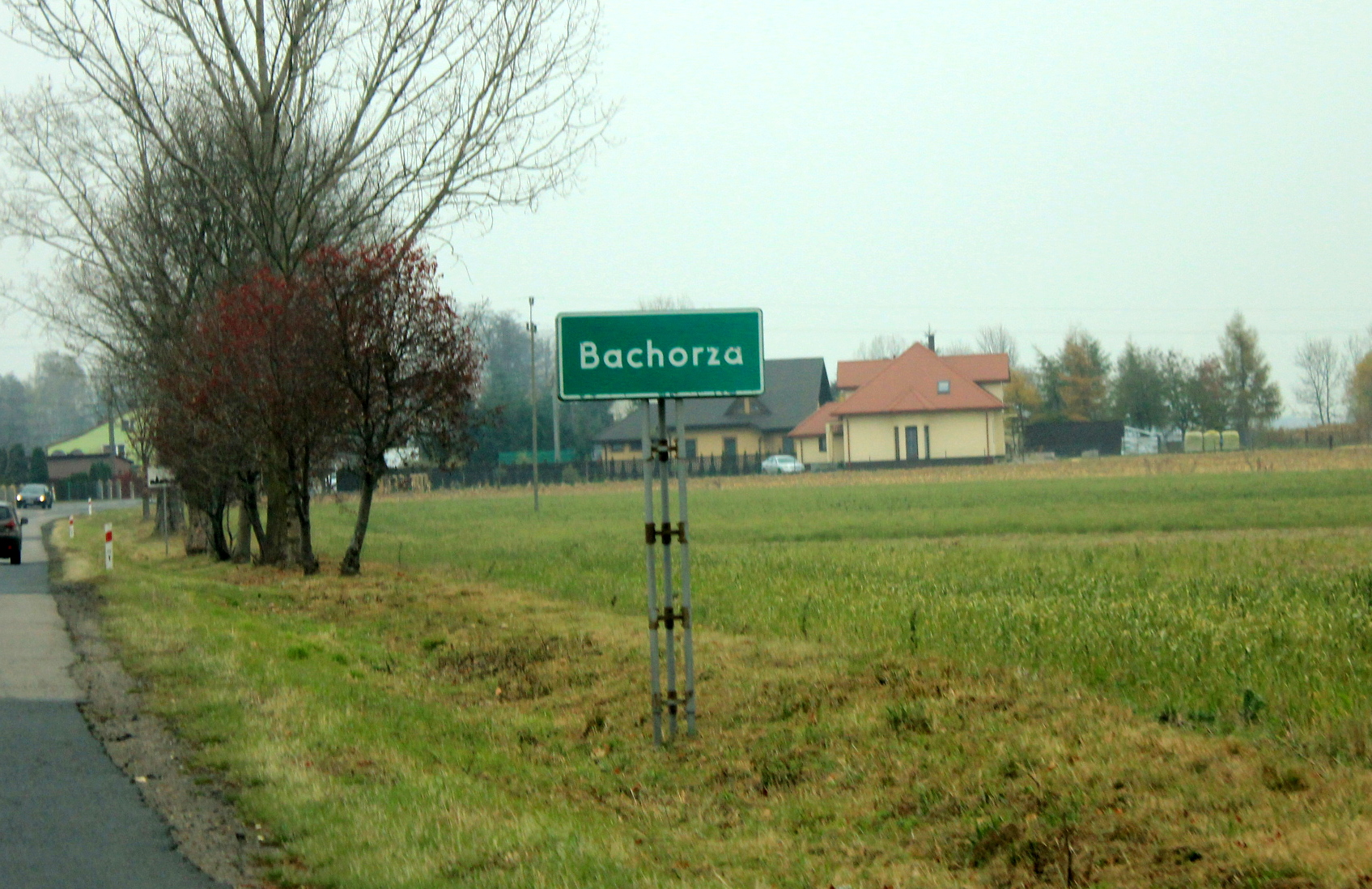

- Location within Poland
- Coordinates: 52°23′35″N 22°18′42″E
- Country: Poland
- Voivodeship: Masovian
- County: Sokołów
- Gmina: Sokołów Podlaski

Bachorza [baˈxɔʐa] is a village in the administrative district of Gmina Sokołów Podlaski, which is located within Sokołów County, Masovian Voivodeship, in east-central Poland.

== Landmarks ==
In Bachorza there was a neo-classical manor house, the Bachorza manor.
