= Węże, Masovian Voivodeship =

Węże
- Village
- Location within Poland
- Coordinates: 52°21′N 22°9′E
- Country: Poland
- Voivodeship: Masovian
- County: Sokołów
- Gmina: Sokołów Podlaski

Węże [ˈvɛ̃ʐɛ] is a village in the administrative district of Gmina Sokołów Podlaski, within Sokołów County, Masovian Voivodeship, in east-central Poland.
